= 2018 Wigan Metropolitan Borough Council election =

2018 local election in England

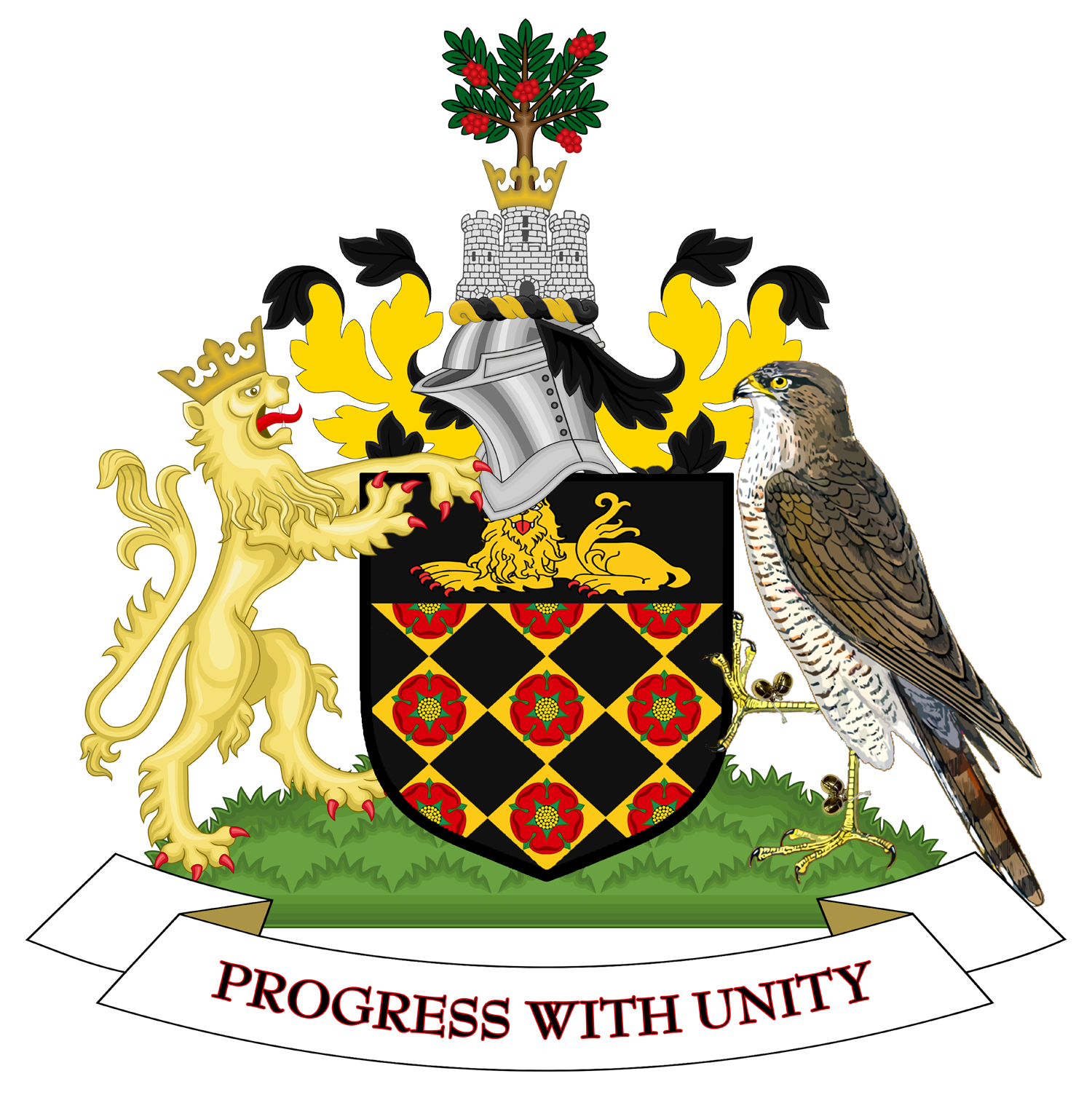
← 2016	3 May 2018	2019 →

25 of 75 seats to Wigan Metropolitan Borough Council 38 seats needed for a majority
	First party	Second party
Leader	Peter Smith	Michael Winstanley
Party	Labour	Conservative
Leader since	1991	11 May 2016
Leader's seat	Leigh West	Orrell
Seats before	65	5
Seats won	60	7
Seat change	▼5	▲2
- 2018 local election results in Wigan Conservative Labour Independent Network Independent

The 2018 Wigan Metropolitan Borough Council election took place on 3 May 2018 to elect members of Wigan Metropolitan Borough Council in England. This was on the same day as other local elections.

== Overview ==
Prior to the election, the composition of the council was:

- Labour Party: 65
- Conservative Party: 5
- Independents: 3
- Wigan Independents: 2

After the election, the composition of the council was:

- Labour Party: 60
- Conservative Party: 7
- Independents: 6
- Wigan Independents: 2

Number of Candidates fielded per party
Party	Number of Candidates
Labour Party (UK)	25
Conservative Party (UK)	25
Liberal Democrats (UK)	14
Independents	11
UKIP	6
Green Party of England and Wales	3
Wigan Independents	3
Democrats and Veterans	1

== Results summary ==
2018 Wigan Metropolitan Borough Council election
Party	This election			Full council			This election		
Party	Seats	Net	Seats %	Other	Total	Total %	Votes	Votes %	+/−
Labour	18	▼5	72	42	60	80.0	32,512	52.3	▲1.2
Conservative	3	▲2	12	4	7	9.3	14,980	24.1	▲7.5
Independent	3	▲3	12	3	6	8.0	8,432	13.6	▲6.2
Wigan Independents	1	Steady	4	1	2	2.7	2,109	3.4	▲0.1
Liberal Democrats	0	Steady	0	0	0	0.0	2,343	3.8	▲2.8
UKIP	0	Steady	0	0	0	0.0	1,196	1.9	▼14.1
Green	0	Steady	0	0	0	0.0	401	0.6	▼0.2
Democrats and Veterans	0	Steady	0	0	0	0.0	140	0.2	New

== Ward results ==
=== Bolton West constituency ===
==== Atherton ward ====
Local Elections 2018: Atherton
Party	Candidate	Votes	%	±%
Independent	Stuart Andrew Gerrard	1,779	53.7	New
Labour	Karen Aldred	1,197	36.2	▼11.9
Conservative	Marjorie Clayton	334	10.1	▼2.0
Majority		582	17.5	N/A
Turnout		3,310	30.7	▲3.2
Independent gain from Labour		Swing		

=== Leigh constituency ===
==== Astley Mosley Common ward ====
Local Elections 2018: Astley Mosley Common
Party	Candidate	Votes	%	±%
Labour	Barry John Taylor	1,349	52.7	▼14.9
Conservative	Richard Alan Short	1,082	42.2	▲9.8
Liberal Democrats	Stuart David Thomas	131	5.1	New
Majority		267	10.5	▼24.7
Turnout		2,562	27.2	▼1.7
Labour hold		Swing		

==== Atherleigh ward ====
Local Elections 2018: Atherleigh
Party	Candidate	Votes	%	±%
Labour	Debra Susan Ann Wailes	938	48.1	▼1.4
Independent	Anthony Thomas Waite	550	28.2	New
Conservative	Paul Lambert Fairhurst	394	20.2	▲5.6
Liberal Democrats	Lorraine Gillon	68	3.5	New
Majority		388	19.9	▲2.6
Turnout		1,950	23.4	▼3.3
Labour hold		Swing		

==== Golborne and Lowton West ward ====
Local Elections 2018: Golborne and Lowton West
Party	Candidate	Votes	%	±%
Labour	Susan Gambles	1,280	57.2	▼7.8
Independent	William Kenneth Heaton	612	27.4	New
Conservative	Gerard Joseph Houlton	345	15.4	▼1.0
Majority		668	29.8	▼16.6
Turnout		2,237	25.3	▼1.7
Labour hold		Swing		

==== Leigh East ward ====
Local Elections 2018: Leigh East
Party	Candidate	Votes	%	±%
Labour	Frederick Brown Walker	1,189	59.6	▼11.3
Conservative	Denise Alison Young	518	26.0	▼3.1
Liberal Democrats	John Dowsett	288	14.4	New
Majority		671	33.6	▼8.2
Turnout		1,995	22.2	▼2.7
Labour hold		Swing		

==== Leigh South ward ====
Local Elections 2018: Leigh South
Party	Candidate	Votes	%	±%
Labour	Charles Rigby	1,531	54.4	▼11.1
Conservative	Connor Jack Short	1,283	45.6	▲11.1
Majority		248	8.8	▼22.2
Turnout		2,814	27.5	▼1.1
Labour hold		Swing		

==== Leigh West ward ====
Local Elections 2018: Leigh West
Party	Candidate	Votes	%	±%
Labour	Peter Richard Charles Smith	1,308	54.1	▼21.2
Independent	Jayson Michael Allan Lomax-Hargreaves	578	23.9	New
Conservative	Richard Byrom Houlton	374	15.5	▼9.2
Liberal Democrats	Natalie Smalley	158	6.5	New
Majority		730	30.2	▼20.4
Turnout		2,418	23.1	▼1.8
Labour hold		Swing		

==== Lowton East ward ====
Local Elections 2018: Lowton East
Party	Candidate	Votes	%	±%
Conservative	Edward Noel Houlton	2,099	60.9	▲14.7
Labour	Garry Peter Lloyd	1,346	39.1	▲6.4
Majority		753	21.8	▲8.3
Turnout		3,445	36.1	▲1.0
Conservative hold		Swing		

==== Tyldesley ward ====
Local Elections 2018: Tyldesley
Party	Candidate	Votes	%	±%
Labour	Joanne Marshall	1,344	51.0	▼14.6
Independent	Julian David Marsh	706	26.8	New
Conservative	David John Stirzaker	587	22.3	▲2.5
Majority		638	24.2	▼21.6
Turnout		2,637	25.5	▼0.9
Labour hold		Swing		

=== Makerfield constituency ===
==== Abram ward ====
Local Elections 2018: Abram
Party	Candidate	Votes	%	±%
Labour	Carl Sweeney	1,479	68.7	▲11.3
Conservative	Beverley Anne Bridgwater	404	18.8	▲12.3
UKIP	Frank Thomas Swift	274	12.7	▼14.9
Majority		1,075	49.9	▲20.1
Turnout		2,152	20.7	▼4.0
Labour hold		Swing		

==== Ashton ward ====
Local Elections 2018: Ashton
Party	Candidate	Votes	%	±%
Labour	Anthony John Sykes	1,112	53.2	▲10.9
Independent	Michael Moulding	793	37.9	New
UKIP	Gillian Mary Gibson	109	5.2	▼16.7
Liberal Democrats	Geoffrey Stephen Matthews	41	2.0	New
Conservative	Marie Winstanley	36	1.7	▼4.6
Majority		319	15.3	▼5.1
Turnout		2,091	23.5	▼6.1
Labour hold		Swing		

==== Bryn ward ====
Local Elections 2018: Bryn
Party	Candidate	Votes	%	±%
Independent	Andrew Collinson	1,065	43.7	New
Labour	Vicky Johnson	973	39.9	▼0.3
Conservative	Judith Anderson	198	8.1	▲3.7
UKIP	Philip Hayden	133	5.5	▼19.0
Liberal Democrats	Denise Melling	67	2.8	▼7.0
Majority		92	3.8	N/A
Turnout		2,436	27.6	▼4.2
Independent gain from Labour		Swing		

==== Hindley ward ====
Local Elections 2018: Hindley
Party	Candidate	Votes	%	±%
Labour	Jim Talbot	1,063	45.9	▼7.2
Independent	Jim Ellis	905	39.0	New
Conservative	Margaret Mary Winstanley	206	8.9	▼0.9
Green	Neil Hancox	86	3.7	New
Liberal Democrats	John Charles Skipworth	58	2.5	New
Majority		158	6.9	▼12.0
Turnout		2,318	24.1	▼2.3
Labour hold		Swing		

==== Hindley Green ward ====
Local Elections 2018: Hindley Green
Party	Candidate	Votes	%	±%
Independent	Paul Anthony Maiden	976	41.4	New
Labour	Gena Merrett	787	33.4	▼10.5
Liberal Democrats	John Thomason	305	13.0	New
Conservative	Jonathan Charles Cartwright	287	12.2	▲3.1
Majority		189	8.0	N/A
Turnout		2,355	27.4	▼2.3
Independent gain from Labour		Swing		

==== Orrell ward ====
Local Elections 2018: Orrell
Party	Candidate	Votes	%	±%
Conservative	Richard Clayton	1,430	46.6	▲14.0
Labour	Eileen Winifred Rigby	1,273	41.5	▲6.6
Liberal Democrats	Denise Margaret Capstick	367	12.0	New
Majority		157	5.1	N/A
Turnout		3,070	32.2	▼1.0
Conservative gain from Labour		Swing		

==== Winstanley ward ====
Local Elections 2018: Winstanley
Party	Candidate	Votes	%	±%
Labour	Clive William Morgan	1,396	58.4	▲14.3
Conservative	Daniel Andrew Whitehouse	509	21.3	▲11.5
Green	Steven Charles Heyes	195	8.2	▲0.4
UKIP	Daniel John Singleton	177	7.4	▼25.3
Liberal Democrats	Neil Duncan Stevenson	114	4.8	New
Majority		887	37.1	▲25.7
Turnout		2,391	26.2	▼3.2
Labour hold		Swing		

==== Worsley Mesnes ward ====
Local Elections 2018: Worsley Mesnes
Party	Candidate	Votes	%	±%
Labour	Patricia Lynne Holland	1,449	66.5	▲6.1
UKIP	Maureen McCoy	327	15.0	▼16.7
Conservative	Paul Chapman	314	14.4	▲6.5
Liberal Democrats	Joshua Hindle	90	4.1	New
Majority		1122	51.5	▲22.8
Turnout		2,180	24.1	▼4.1
Labour hold		Swing		

=== Wigan constituency ===
==== Aspull, New Springs and Whelley ward ====
Local Elections 2018: Aspull, New Springs and Whelley
Party	Candidate	Votes	%	±%
Labour	Ronald Josef Conway	1,708	61.4	▲15.4
Conservative	Michael Colin Owens	764	27.5	▲16.1
Liberal Democrats	Andrew Julian Lee Holland	308	11.1	New
Majority		944	33.9	▲12.0
Turnout		2,780	28.2	▼5.0
Labour hold		Swing		

==== Douglas ward ====
Local Elections 2018: Douglas
Party	Candidate	Votes	%	±%
Labour	Shirley Ann Dewhurst	1,551	78.6	▲18.6
Conservative	Margaret Atherton	422	21.4	▲13.0
Majority		1,129	57.2	▲28.7
Turnout		1,973	20.8	▼4.1
Labour hold		Swing		

==== Ince ward ====
Local Elections 2018: Ince
Party	Candidate	Votes	%	±%
Labour	James Moodie	1,273	69.2	▲12.4
Independent	James O'Neill	379	20.6	New
Conservative	Yamini Gupta	188	10.2	▲4.8
Majority		894	48.6	▲26.4
Turnout		1,840	20.7	▼5.4
Labour hold		Swing		

==== Pemberton ward ====
Local Elections 2018: Pemberton
Party	Candidate	Votes	%	±%
Labour	Paul Prescott	1,472	74.4	▲11.7
Conservative	Susan Atherton	322	16.3	▲8.8
Liberal Democrats	David John Burley	185	9.3	New
Majority		1,150	58.1	▲22.0
Turnout		1,979	20.6	▼4.8
Labour hold		Swing		

==== Shevington with Lower Ground ward ====
Local Elections 2018: Shevington with Lower Ground
Party	Candidate	Votes	%	±%
Shevington Independents	Janet Brown	1,107	40.1	▲14.8
Labour	Mike Crosby	1,045	37.9	▲4.6
Conservative	Allan Atherton	487	17.7	▲6.5
Green	Joseph Robert Rylance	120	4.3	▼0.6
Majority		62	2.2	N/A
Turnout		2,759	29.6	▼3.9
Shevington Independents gain from Labour		Swing		

"Shevington Independents" is a description used by candidates for the Wigan Independents.

==== Standish with Langtree ward ====
Local Elections 2018: Standish with Langtree
Party	Candidate	Votes	%	±%
Conservative	Adam James Marsh	1,200	36.8	▲17.4
Labour	Debbie Parkinson	1,185	36.4	▲18.5
Standish Independents	Debbie Fairhurst	872	26.8	▼15.8
Majority		15	0.4	N/A
Turnout		3,257	33.3	▼3.4
Conservative gain from Standish Independents		Swing		

"Standish Independents" is a description used by candidates for the Wigan Independents.

==== Wigan Central ward ====
Local Elections 2018: Wigan Central
Party	Candidate	Votes	%	±%
Labour	George Davies	1,518	55.5	▲3.7
Conservative	Lewis David Evans	834	30.5	▲10.9
Liberal Democrats	Caroline Waddicor	163	6.0	New
Wigan Independents	Gareth William Fairhurst	130	4.8	New
Independent	Tony Spencer	89	3.3	New
Majority		684	25.0	▲1.8
Turnout		2,734	29.5	▼3.7
Labour hold		Swing		

==== Wigan West ward ====
Local Elections 2018: Wigan West
Party	Candidate	Votes	%	±%
Labour	Phyllis Mary Cullen	1,746	72.0	▲11.4
Conservative	Jean Margaret Peet	363	15.0	▲9.6
UKIP	Nathan Alan Ryding	176	7.3	▼17.9
Democrats and Veterans	Ronnie Clark	140	5.8	New
Majority		1,383	57.0	▲21.6
Turnout		2,425	25.4	▼2.7
Labour hold		Swing		
