= 2019 Wigan Metropolitan Borough Council election =

English local election

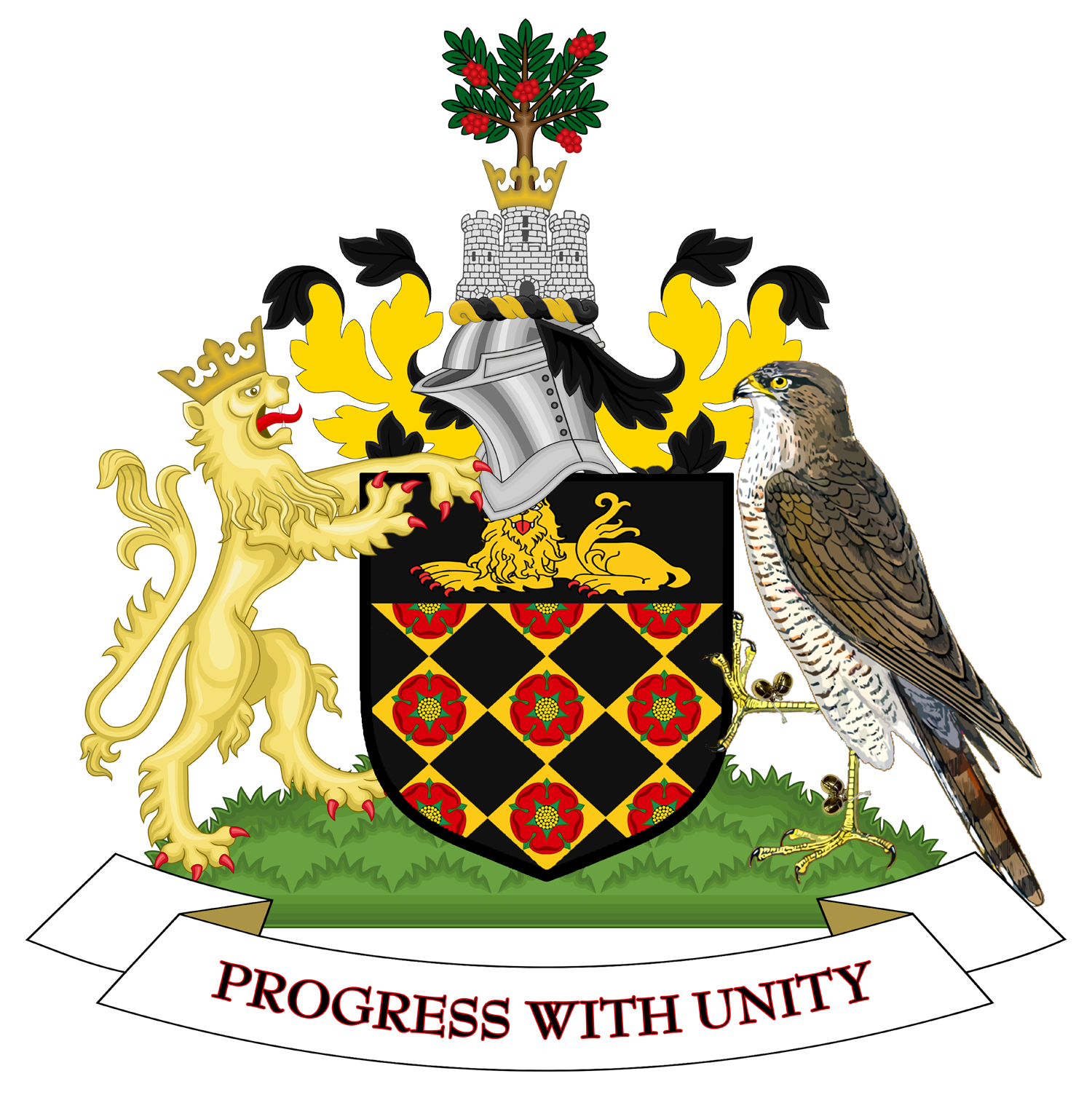
- 2 May 2019

25 of 75 seats to Wigan Metropolitan Borough Council 38 seats needed for a majority
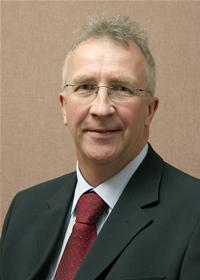

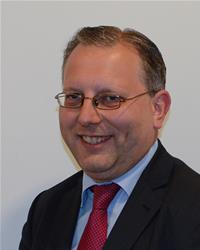
	First party	Second party
Leader	David Molyneux	Michael Winstanley
Party	Labour	Conservative
Leader since	15 May 2018	11 May 2016
Leader's seat	Ince	Orrell
Seats before	60	7
Seats after	57	8
Seat change	▼3	▲1
- 2019 local election results in Wigan. Labour Conservative Independent Network Labour and Co-op Independent

The 2019 Wigan Metropolitan Borough Council election took place on Thursday 2 May 2019 to elect members of Wigan Metropolitan Borough Council in England. This was on the same day as other local elections.

== Overview ==
Prior to the election, the composition of the council was:

- Labour Party: 60
- Conservative Party: 7
- Independent: 8

After the election, the composition of the council was:

- Labour Party: 57
- Conservative Party: 8
- Independent: 10

Number of Candidates fielded per party
Party	Number of Candidates
Labour Party (UK)	25
Conservative Party (UK)	25
UKIP	21
Independents	15
Liberal Democrats (UK)	13
Green Party of England and Wales	6
Leigh, Atherton & Tyldesley Together	4

== Results summary ==
2019 Wigan Metropolitan Borough Council election
Party	This election				Full council			This election		
Party	Candidates	Seats	Net	Seats %	Other	Total	Total %	Votes	Votes %	+/−
Labour	{{{candidates}}}	20	▼3	80	37	57	76.0	26,465	41.4	▼9.0
Conservative	{{{candidates}}}	2	▲1	8	6	8	10.7	10,782	16.9	▼2.4
Independent	{{{candidates}}}	3	▲2	12	7	10	13.3	12,336	19.3	▲14.0
UKIP	{{{candidates}}}	0	Steady	0	0	0	0.0	9,199	14.4	▼6.6
Liberal Democrats	{{{candidates}}}	0	Steady	0	0	0	0.0	2,468	3.9	▲3.4
Green	{{{candidates}}}	0	Steady	0	0	0	0.0	1,571	2.5	▲0.5
Leigh, Atherton & Tyldesley Together	{{{candidates}}}	0	Steady	0	0	0	0.0	1,154	1.8	New

== Ward results ==
=== Bolton West constituency ===
==== Atherton ward ====
Local Elections 2019: Atherton
Party	Candidate	Votes	%	±%
Independent	James Paul Watson	1,826	54.9	New
Labour	David Keir Stitt	708	21.3	▼18.6
UKIP	Glenn Marsh	311	9.3	▼5.8
Leigh, Atherton & Tyldesley Together	Quinton John Smith	311	9.3	New
Conservative	Marjorie Clayton	171	5.1	▼7.4
Majority		1,118	33.6	N/A
Turnout		3,327	30.6	
Independent gain from Labour		Swing		

=== Leigh constituency ===
==== Astley Mosley Common ward ====
Local Elections 2019: Astley Mosley Common
Party	Candidate	Votes	%	±%
Labour	Christine Lilian Roberts	1,205	47.1	▲4.9
Conservative	Richard Alan Short	715	28.0	▼2.7
UKIP	Allan Hogg	637	24.9	▲2.7
Majority		490	19.1	▲7.6
Turnout		2,557	27.0	
Labour hold		Swing		

==== Atherleigh ward ====
Local Elections 2019: Atherleigh
Party	Candidate	Votes	%	±%
Labour	Mark Aldred	821	39.7	▼8.5
Independent	Kevin John Lee	547	26.4	New
UKIP	Mary Therese Lavelle	354	17.1	▼3.9
Conservative	Paul Lambert Fairhurst	211	10.2	▼7.7
Leigh, Atherton & Tyldesley Together	Susan Ann Davies	135	6.5	New
Majority		274	13.3	▼13.9
Turnout		2,068	24.8	
Labour hold		Swing		

==== Golborne and Lowton West ward ====
Local Elections 2019: Golborne and Lowton West
Party	Candidate	Votes	%	±%
Labour	Gena Merrett	1,011	45.7	▼14.8
Independent	Susan Jillian Spibey	568	25.7	New
UKIP	Stuart Kevin Blakeley	420	19.0	▼0.3
Conservative	Gerard Joseph Houlton	211	9.5	▼6.3
Majority		443	20.0	▼21.2
Turnout		2,210	25.0	
Labour hold		Swing		

==== Leigh East ward ====
Local Elections 2019: Leigh East
Party	Candidate	Votes	%	±%
Labour	Anita Thorpe	995	45.9	▼12.4
UKIP	Aiden Jay Slack	392	18.1	▼3.4
Conservative	Richard Byrom Houlton	298	13.8	▼3.8
Leigh, Atherton & Tyldesley Together	James Edward Morley	296	13.7	New
Liberal Democrats	John Dowsett	185	8.5	New
Majority		603	27.8	▼9.0
Turnout		2,166	24.0	
Labour hold		Swing		

==== Leigh South ward ====
Local Elections 2019: Leigh South
Party	Candidate	Votes	%	±%
Labour	John David O'Brien	1,378	46.7	▼4.6
Conservative	Connor Jack Short	844	28.6	▲6.5
UKIP	Leon Adam Peters	729	24.7	▼0.1
Majority		534	18.1	▼8.4
Turnout		2,951	28.6	
Labour hold		Swing		

==== Leigh West ward ====
Local Elections 2019: Leigh West
Party	Candidate	Votes	%	±%
Labour	Dane Kevan Anderton	1,049	43.2	▼13.5
UKIP	Brian Aspinall	613	25.2	▼1.0
Leigh, Atherton & Tyldesley Together	Jayson Michael Allan Lomax-Hargreaves	412	16.9	New
Conservative	Denise Alison Young	196	8.1	▼3.8
Liberal Democrats	Natalie Smalley	161	6.6	New
Majority		436	18.0	▼12.5
Turnout		2,431	23.1	
Labour hold		Swing		

==== Lowton East ward ====
Local Elections 2019: Lowton East
Party	Candidate	Votes	%	±%
Conservative	Kathleen Houlton	2,111	60.8	▲10.5
Labour	Gary Peter Lloyd	986	28.4	▼11.8
UKIP	Mary Patricia Houghton	377	10.9	New
Majority		1,125	32.4	▲22.3
Turnout		3,474	36.1	
Conservative hold		Swing		

==== Tyldesley ward ====
Local Elections 2019: Tyldesley
Party	Candidate	Votes	%	±%
Labour	Stephen John Hellier	1,037	38.0	▼7.2
Independent	Julian David Marsh	887	32.5	New
UKIP	Kerry Anne Ford	473	17.3	▼7.6
Conservative	David John Stirzaker	334	12.2	▼7.3
Majority		150	5.5	▼14.8
Turnout		2,731	26.6	
Labour hold		Swing		

=== Makerfield constituency ===
==== Abram ward ====
Local Elections 2019: Abram
Party	Candidate	Votes	%	±%
Labour	Eunice Smethurst	1,117	45.2	▼13.8
Independent	David William Bowker	633	25.6	New
UKIP	Frank Swift	387	15.7	▼12.7
Conservative	Beverley Anne Bridgwater	334	13.5	▲1.5
Majority		484	19.6	▼11.0
Turnout		2,471	23.7	
Labour hold		Swing		

==== Ashton ward ====
Local Elections 2019: Ashton
Party	Candidate	Votes	%	±%
Labour	Jenny Bullen	1,038	39.0	▼10.0
Independent	Michael Moulding	1,003	37.7	New
UKIP	Mark Michael Temperton	306	11.5	▼5.5
Conservative	Marie Winstanley	212	8.0	▼6.9
Liberal Democrats	Geoffrey Stephen Matthews	101	3.8	New
Majority		35	1.3	▼30.7
Turnout		2,660	30.1	
Labour hold		Swing		

==== Bryn ward ====
Local Elections 2019: Bryn
Party	Candidate	Votes	%	±%
Independent	Sylvia Wilkinson	1,147	42.2	New
Labour	Danny Fletcher	1,072	39.4	Steady
UKIP	Philip John Hayden	284	10.4	▼6.2
Conservative	Margaret Mary Winstanley	131	4.8	▼1.8
Liberal Democrats	Denise Melling	84	3.1	New
Majority		75	2.8	N/A
Turnout		2,718	31.0	
Independent gain from Labour		Swing		

==== Hindley ward ====
Local Elections 2019: Hindley
Party	Candidate	Votes	%	±%
Independent	Jim Ellis	1,273	50.7	New
Labour	Jim Churton	854	34.0	▼20.7
Green	Neil Hancox	178	7.1	New
Conservative	Claire Houlton	135	5.4	▼7.7
Liberal Democrats	John Charles Skipworth	70	2.8	▼2.6
Majority		419	16.7	N/A
Turnout		2,510	26.2	
Independent gain from Labour		Swing		

==== Hindley Green ward ====
Local Elections 2019: Hindley Green
Party	Candidate	Votes	%	±%
Labour	John Melville Vickers	905	39.7	▼15.5
Independent	Deborah Louise Lloyd	770	33.8	New
UKIP	Gillian Mary Gibson	370	16.2	▼13.3
Conservative	Susan Atherton	156	6.8	▼8.5
Liberal Democrats	Joshua Michael Hindle	79	3.5	New
Majority		135	5.9	▼19.8
Turnout		2,280	26.7	
Labour hold		Swing		

==== Orrell ward ====
Local Elections 2019: Orrell
Party	Candidate	Votes	%	±%
Conservative	Steven Lyn Evans	1,096	39.8	▲4.3
Labour	Stephen Murphy	1,023	37.2	▼7.1
Liberal Democrats	Denise Margaret Capstick	318	11.6	New
Green	Donald McQueen	314	11.4	▲6.3
Majority		73	2.6	N/A
Turnout		2,751	29.3	
Conservative gain from Labour		Swing		

==== Winstanley ward ====
Local Elections 2019: Winstanley
Party	Candidate	Votes	%	±%
Labour	Marie Teresa Morgan	1,017	42.2	▼6.8
UKIP	Scott Sheedy	497	20.6	▼3.7
Conservative	Allan Atherton	333	13.8	▼6.2
Green	Steven Charles Heyes	319	13.2	▲6.5
Liberal Democrats	Robert Duncan Stevenson	242	10.0	New
Majority		520	21.6	▼3.1
Turnout		2,408	26.6	
Labour hold		Swing		

==== Worsley Mesnes ward ====
Local Elections 2019: Worsley Mesnes
Party	Candidate	Votes	%	±%
Labour	Billy Rotheram	1,076	46.1	▼13.3
Independent	Clifford Oakley	713	30.5	New
UKIP	Maureen Ann McCoy	383	16.4	▼9.6
Conservative	Mikah Robyn Evans	163	7.0	▼4.1
Majority		363	15.6	▼17.8
Turnout		2,335	25.8	
Labour hold		Swing		

=== Wigan constituency ===
==== Aspull, New Springs and Whelley ward ====
Local Elections 2019: Aspull, New Springs and Whelley
Party	Candidate	Votes	%	±%
Labour	Christopher Ready	1,578	60.9	▲5.6
Conservative	Nathan Andrew Sweeney	526	20.3	▲0.2
Liberal Democrats	Andrew Julian Lee Holland	489	18.9	New
Majority		1,052	40.6	▲7.4
Turnout		2,593	27.1	▼36.2
Labour hold		Swing		

==== Douglas ward ====
Local Elections 2019: Douglas
Party	Candidate	Votes	%	±%
Labour	Sheila Rosaleen Ramsdale	994	47.7	▼16.5
UKIP	Dalila Garcia Fearn	417	20.0	▼3.1
Independent	John Blondel	384	18.4	New
Green	Peter Ernest Jacobs	165	7.9	New
Conservative	Margaret Atherton	125	6.0	▼4.7
Majority		577	27.7	▼13.7
Turnout		2,085	21.8	▼28.4
Labour hold		Swing		

==== Ince ward ====
Local Elections 2019: Ince
Party	Candidate	Votes	%	±%
Labour	Janice Sharratt	992	51.3	▼12.8
UKIP	Nathan Paul McIntyre	450	23.3	▼2.7
Independent	Jimmy O'Neill	370	19.1	New
Conservative	Grace Elizabeth Aspey	123	6.4	▼1.3
Majority		542	28.0	▼10.1
Turnout		1,935	22.0	▼28.6
Labour hold		Swing		

==== Pemberton ward ====
Local Elections 2019: Pemberton
Party	Candidate	Votes	%	±%
Labour	Eileen Winifred Rigby	1,127	54.7	▼8.2
UKIP	Craig Alan Buckley	577	28.0	▲6.1
Conservative	Jean Margaret Peet	202	9.8	▼1.1
Liberal Democrats	David John Burley	154	7.5	New
Majority		550	26.7	▼14.3
Turnout		2,060	21.5	▼29.1
Labour hold		Swing		

==== Shevington with Lower Ground ward ====
Local Elections 2019: Shevington with Lower Ground
Party	Candidate	Votes	%	±%
Labour	Paul Anthony Collins	988	34.1	▼9.4
Independent	Gareth William Fairhurst	895	30.9	New
Conservative	Michael Colin Owens	356	12.3	▼14.3
Green	Joseph Robert Rylance	336	11.6	▲4.8
UKIP	Derek Wilkes	324	11.2	▼11.9
Majority		93	3.2	▼13.7
Turnout		2,899	31.3	▼36.2
Labour hold		Swing		

==== Standish with Langtree ward ====
Local Elections 2019: Standish with Langtree
Party	Candidate	Votes	%	±%
Labour	Debbie Parkinson	1,038	31.6	▲5.3
Conservative	Judith Atherton	946	28.8	▲0.8
Independent	George Allan Fairhurst	774	23.6	▼6.7
UKIP	Carl Davies	354	10.8	▼3.2
Liberal Democrats	Neil Duncan Stevenson	174	5.3	New
Majority		92	2.8	N/A
Turnout		3,286	32.5	▼35.5
Labour gain from Standish Independents		Swing		

==== Wigan Central ward ====
Local Elections 2019: Wigan Central
Party	Candidate	Votes	%	±%
Labour	Michael McLoughlin	1,222	45.1	▼1.8
Conservative	Lewis Evans	672	24.8	▲1.4
Independent	Tony Spencer	546	20.2	New
Liberal Democrats	Stuart Thomas	268	9.9	New
Majority		550	20.3	▼3.2
Turnout		2,708	29.4	▼34.4
Labour hold		Swing		

==== Wigan West ward ====
Local Elections 2019: Wigan West
Party	Candidate	Votes	%	±%
Labour	Steve Dawber	1,234	52.8	▼9.3
UKIP	Nathan Ryding	544	23.3	▲2.0
Green	William Patterson	233	10.0	New
Conservative	Yamini Gupta	181	7.8	▼5.1
Liberal Democrats	Caroline Waddicor	143	6.1	New
Majority		690	29.5	▼11.2
Turnout		2,335	24.6	▼32.9
Labour hold		Swing		
