= Wigan West =

- Electoral ward
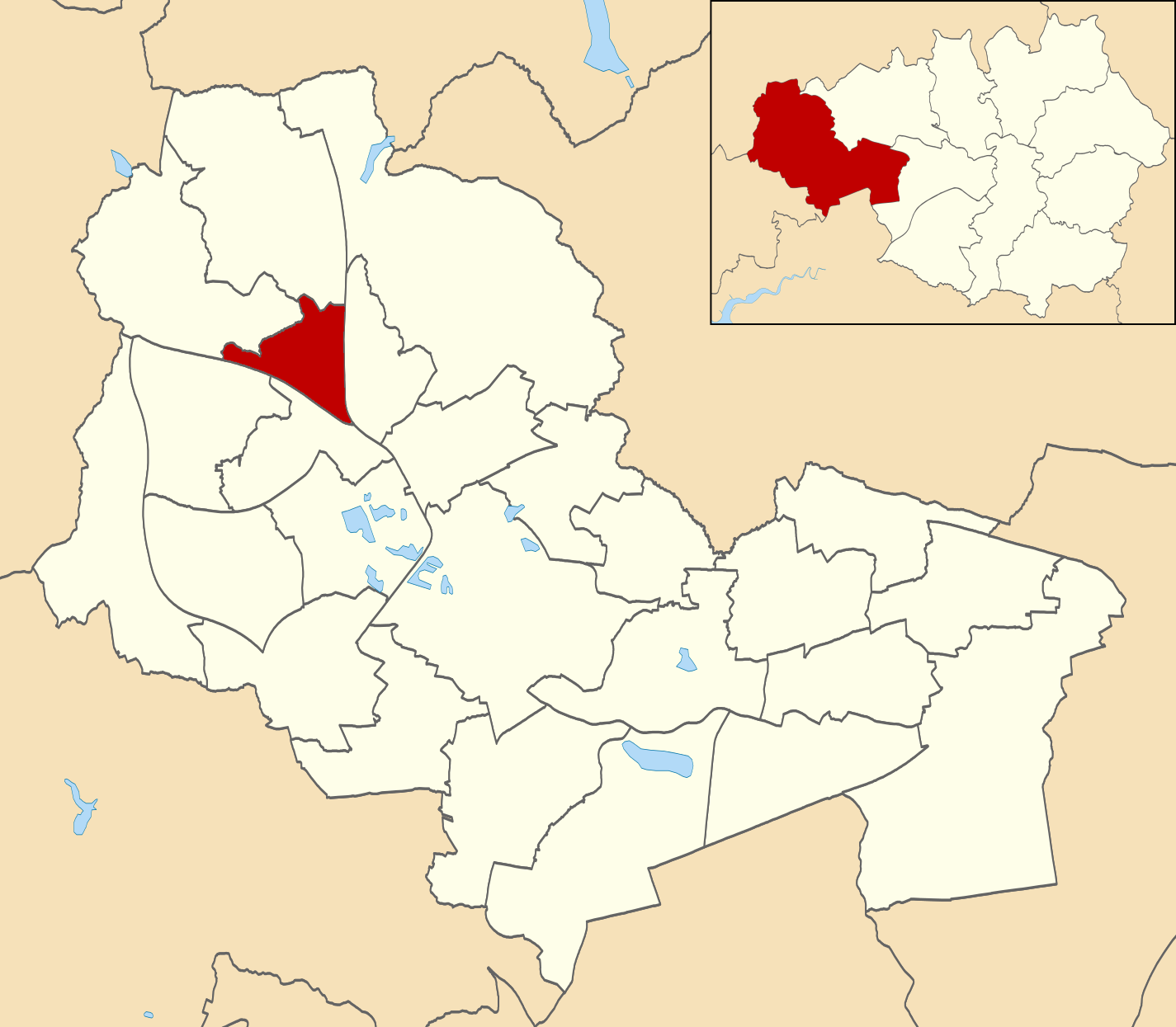
- Wigan West ward within Wigan Metropolitan Borough Council

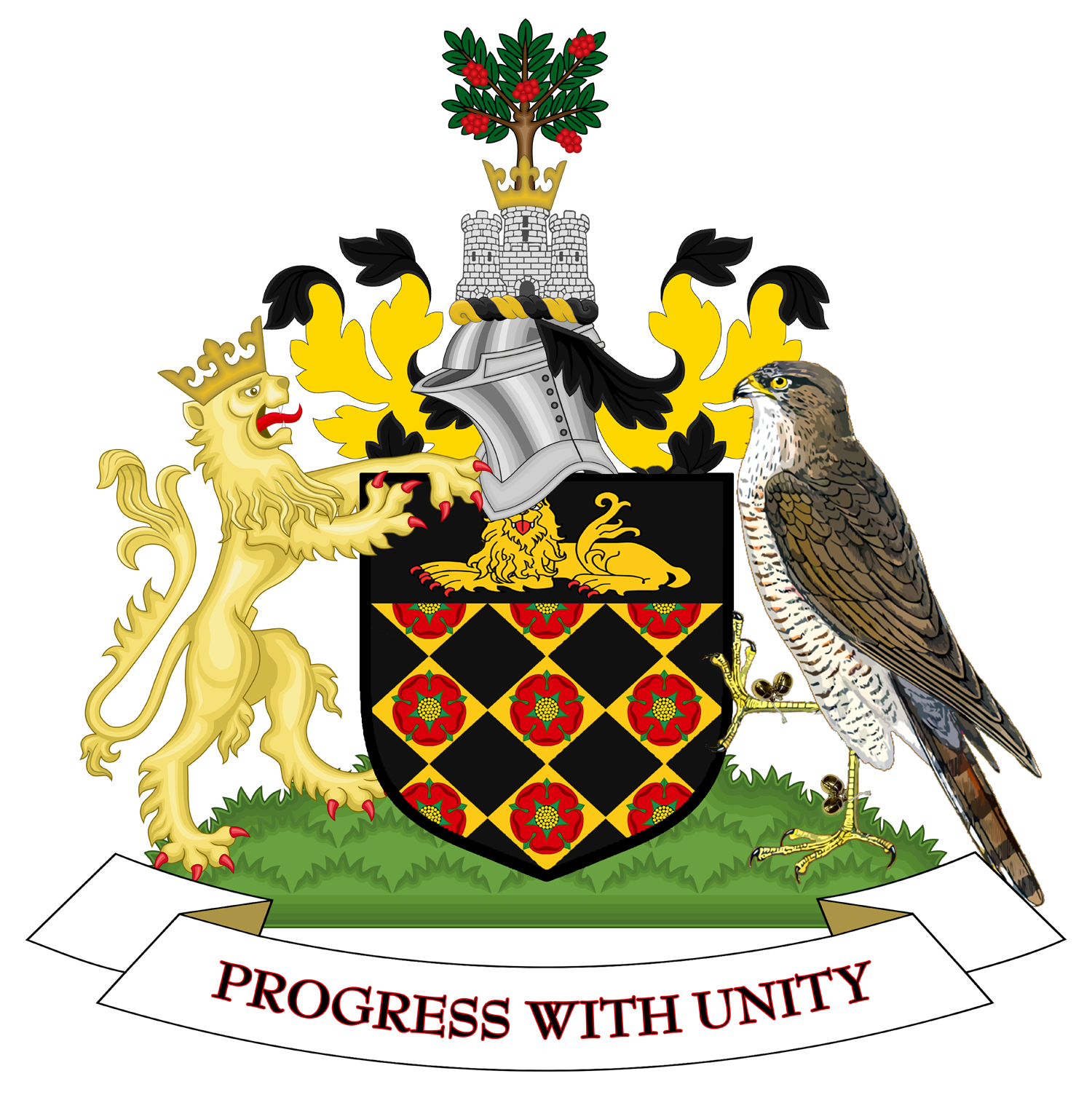
- Coat of arms
- Motto: Progress with Unity
- Country: United Kingdom
- Constituent country: England
- Region: North West England
- County: Greater Manchester
- Metropolitan borough: Wigan
- Created: May 2004

Government
  - Type: Unicameral
  - Body: Wigan Metropolitan Borough Council
  - Mayor of Wigan: Anne Collins (Labour)
  - Councillor: Phyllis Cullen (Labour)
  - Councillor: Sam Ashton (Reform)
  - Councillor: Sheila Ramsdale (Labour)

Population
  - Total: 13,226

Wigan West is an electoral ward in Wigan, England. It forms part of Wigan Metropolitan Borough Council, as well as the parliamentary constituency of Wigan.

== Councillors ==
The ward is represented by three councillors: Phyllis Cullen (Lab), Sam Ashton (Ref) and Terence Halliwell (Lab).

Election	Councillor	Councillor	Councillor
2004	Joe Shaw (Lab)	D. Willis (Lab)	Terry Halliwell (Lab)
2006	Joe Shaw (Lab)	D. Willis (Lab)	Terry Halliwell (Lab)
2007	Joe Shaw (Lab)	Mike Baines (Lab)	Terry Halliwell (Lab)
By-election, 20 September 2007	Phyllis Cullen (Lab)	Mike Baines (Lab)	Terry Halliwell (Lab)
2008	Phyllis Cullen (Lab)	Mike Baines (Lab)	Terry Halliwell (Lab)
By-election, 10 July 2008	Phyllis Cullen (Lab)	Stephen Dawber (Lab)	Terry Halliwell (Lab)
2010	Phyllis Cullen (Lab)	Stephen Dawber (Lab)	Terry Halliwell (Lab)
2011	Phyllis Cullen (Lab)	Stephen Dawber (Lab)	Terry Halliwell (Lab)
2012	Phyllis Cullen (Lab)	Stephen Dawber (Lab)	Terry Halliwell (Lab)
2014	Phyllis Cullen (Lab)	Stephen Dawber (Lab)	Terry Halliwell (Lab)
2015	Phyllis Cullen (Lab)	Stephen Dawber (Lab)	Terry Halliwell (Lab)
2016	Phyllis Cullen (Lab)	Stephen Dawber (Lab)	Terry Halliwell (Lab)
2018	Phyllis Cullen (Lab)	Stephen Dawber (Lab)	Terry Halliwell (Lab)
2019	Phyllis Cullen (Lab)	Stephen Dawber (Lab)	Terry Halliwell (Lab)
2021	Phyllis Cullen (Lab)	Stephen Dawber (Lab)	Terry Halliwell (Lab)
2022	Phyllis Cullen (Lab)	Stephen Dawber (Lab)	Terry Halliwell (Lab)
2023	Phyllis Cullen (Lab)	Dave Wood (Lab)	Sheila Ramsdale (Lab)
2024	Phyllis Cullen (Lab)	Dave Wood (Lab)	Sheila Ramsdale (Lab)
2026	Phyllis Cullen (Lab)	Sam Ashton (Ref)	Sheila Ramsdale (Lab)

indicates seat up for re-election. indicates seat won in by-election.
