= Wigan Central =

- Electoral ward
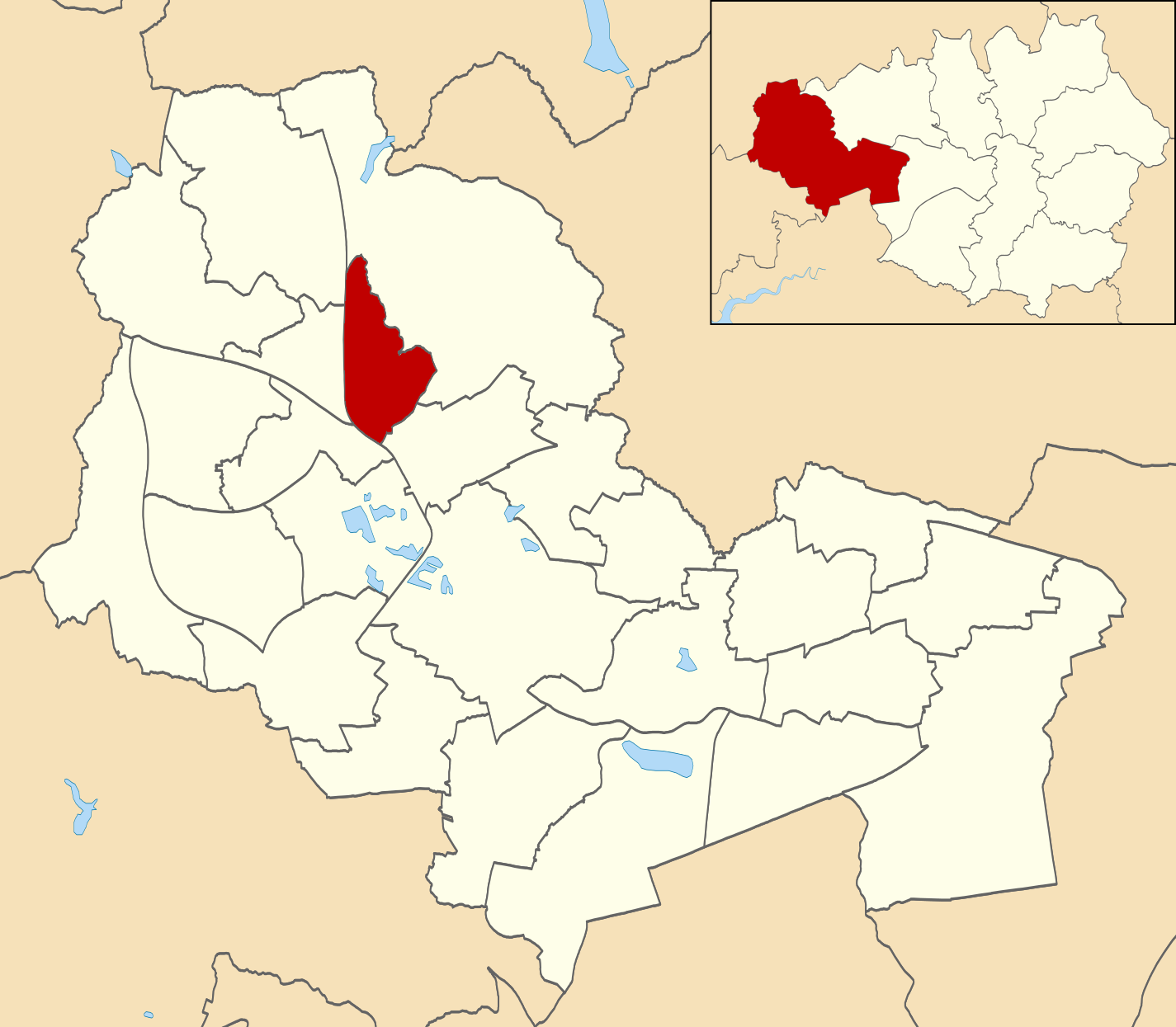
- Wigan Central ward within Wigan Metropolitan Borough Council

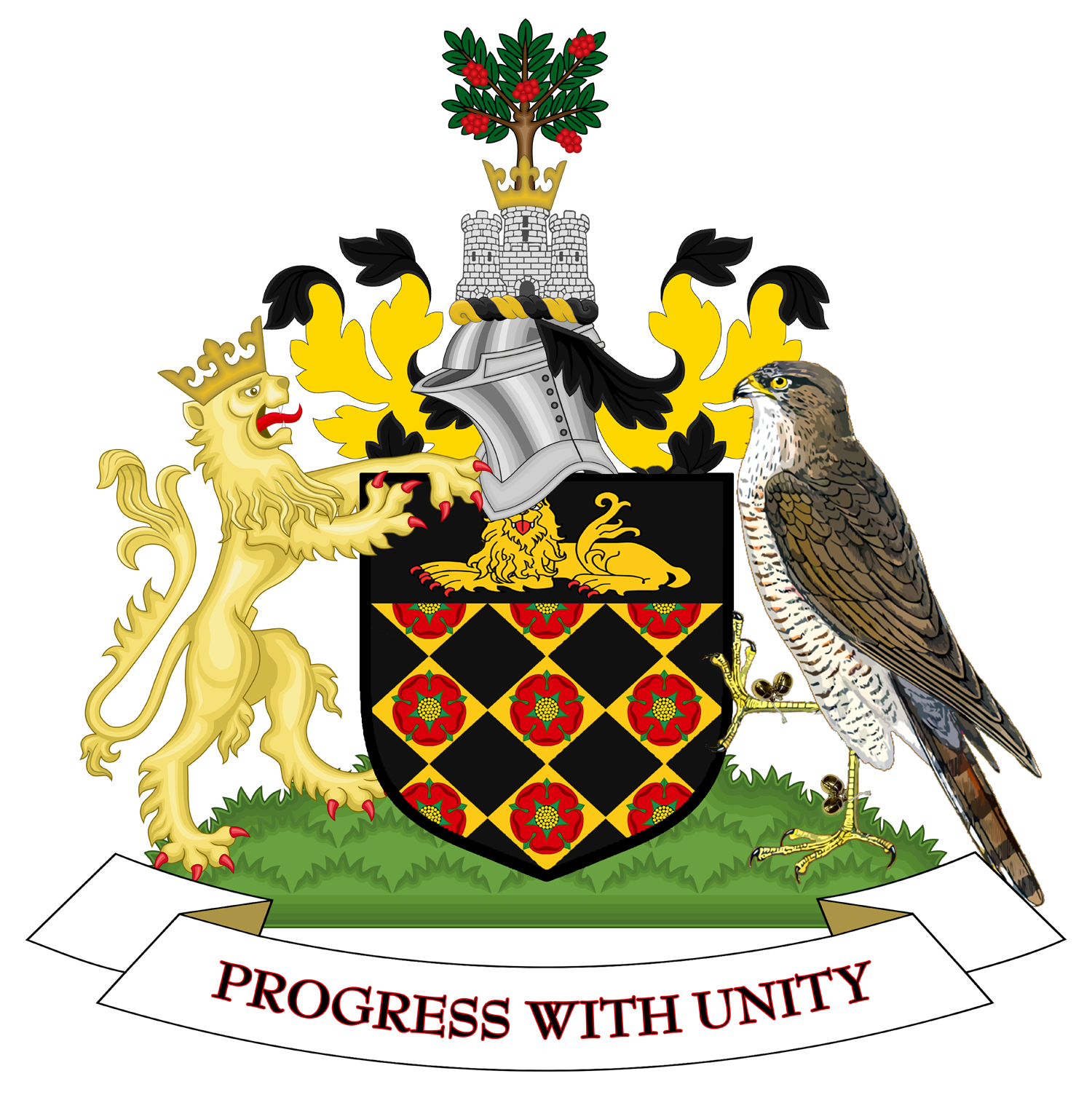
- Coat of arms
- Motto: Progress with Unity
- Country: United Kingdom
- Constituent country: England
- Region: North West England
- County: Greater Manchester
- Metropolitan borough: Wigan
- Created: May 2004

Government
  - Type: Unicameral
  - Body: Wigan Metropolitan Borough Council
  - Mayor of Wigan: Debbie Parkinson (Labour)
  - Councillor: Lee Moffitt (Reform)
  - Councillor: Michael McLoughlin (Labour)
  - Councillor: Lawrence Hunt (Labour)

Population
  - Total: 12,052

Wigan Central is an electoral ward in Wigan, England. It forms part of Wigan Metropolitan Borough Council, as well as the parliamentary constituency of Wigan.

== Councillors ==
The ward is represented by three councillors: Lee Moffitt (Ref), Lawrence Hunt (Lab), and Michael McLoughlin (Lab).

Election	Councillor	Councillor	Councillor
2023	Michael McLoughlin (Lab)	George Davies (Lab)	Lawrence Hunt (Lab)
2024	Michael McLoughlin (Lab)	George Davies (Lab)	Lawrence Hunt (Lab)
By-election, 2 October 2025	Michael McLoughlin (Lab)	Lee Moffitt (Ref)	Lawrence Hunt (Lab)
2026	Michael McLoughlin (Lab)	Lee Moffitt (Ref)	Lawrence Hunt (Lab)

indicates seat up for re-election. indicates seat won in by-election.
