= Leigh East (ward) =

- Electoral ward
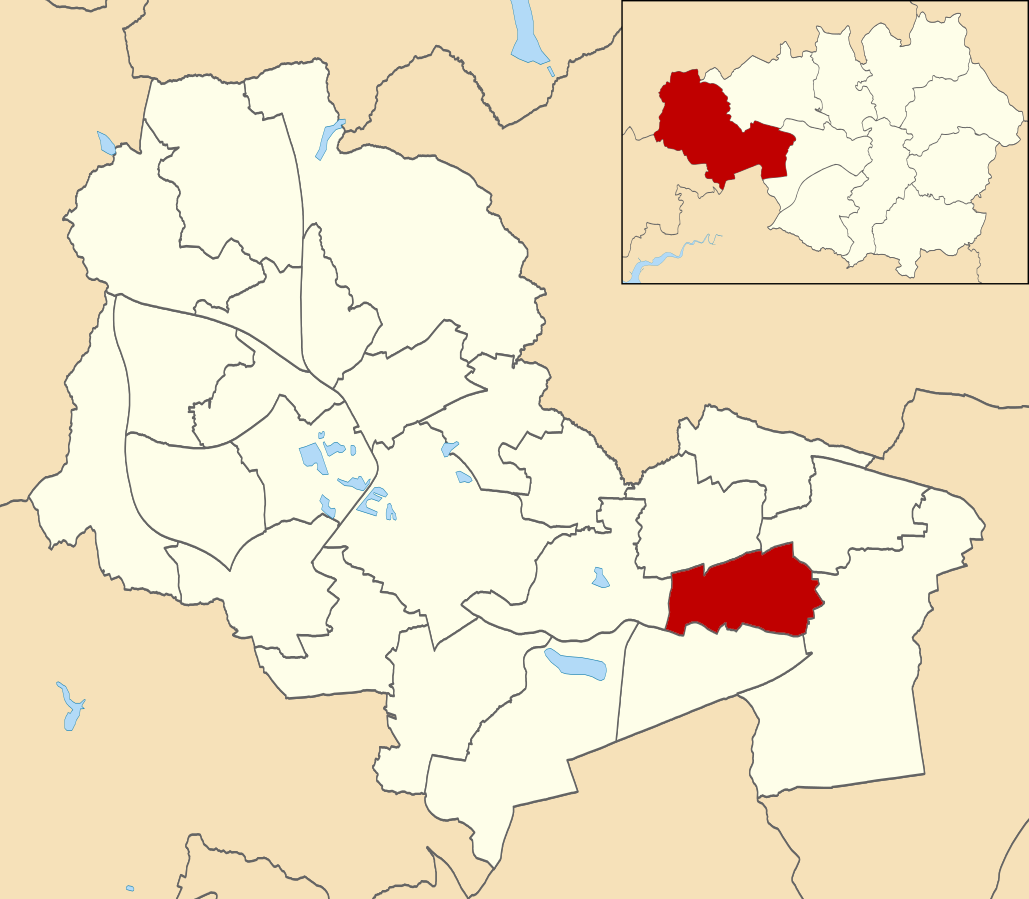
- Leigh East ward within Wigan Metropolitan Borough Council

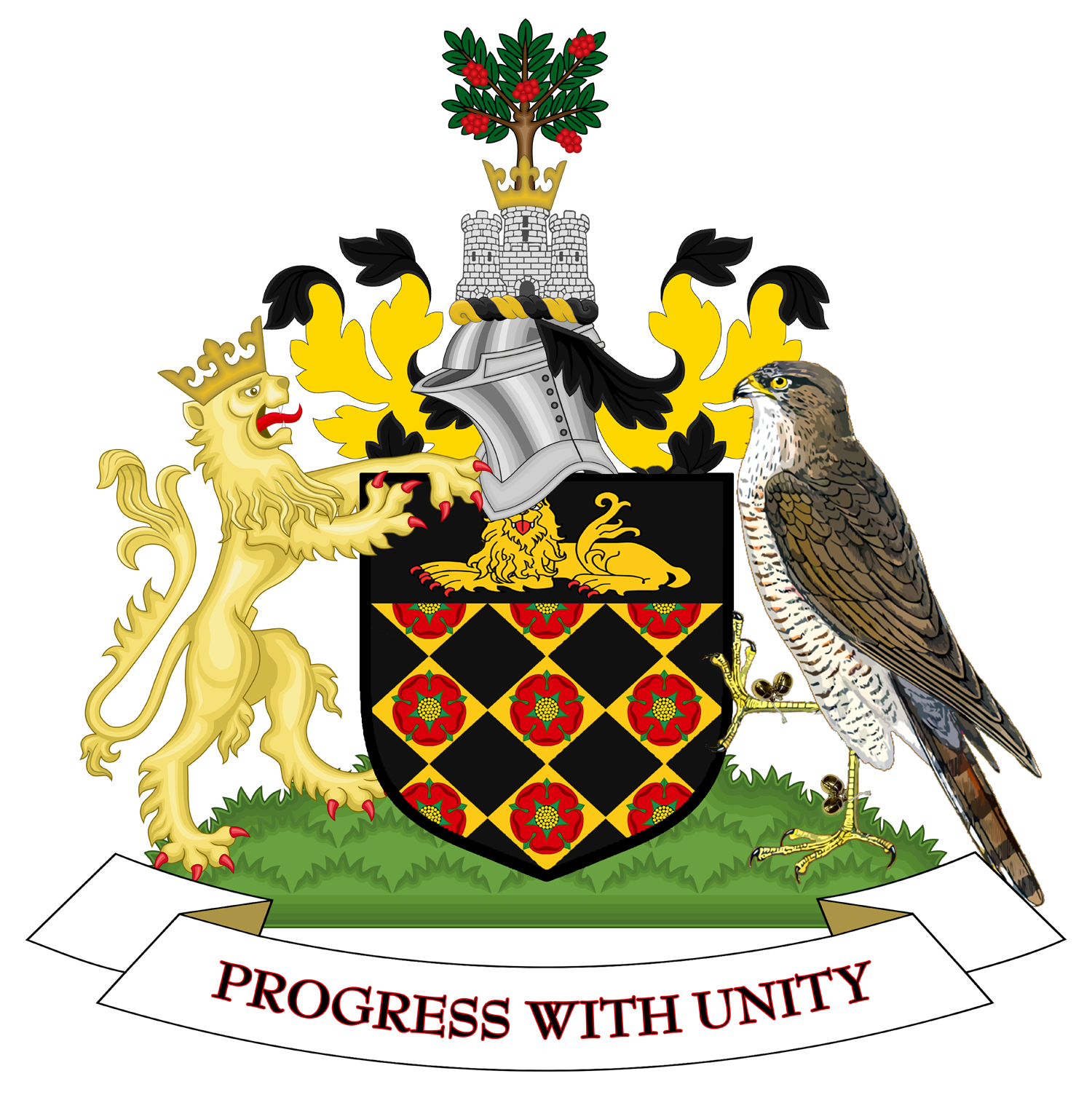
- Coat of arms
- Motto: Progress with Unity
- Interactive map of Leigh East
- Coordinates: 53.5009°N 2.4933°W
- Country: United Kingdom
- Constituent country: England
- Region: North West England
- County: Greater Manchester
- Metropolitan borough: Wigan
- Created: May 2004

Government
  - Type: Unicameral
  - Body: Wigan Metropolitan Borough Council
  - Mayor of Wigan: Sue Greensmith (Labour)
  - Councillor: Keith Cunliffe (Labour)
  - Councillor: Anita Thorpe (Labour)
  - Councillor: Frederick Walker (Labour)

Population
  - Total: 12,376

Leigh East is an electoral ward in Leigh, England. It forms part of Wigan Metropolitan Borough Council, as well as the parliamentary constituency of Leigh.

== Councillors ==
The ward is represented by three councillors: Keith Cunliffe (Lab), Anita Thorpe (Lab), and Frederick Walker.
