= Astley Mosley Common =

- Electoral ward
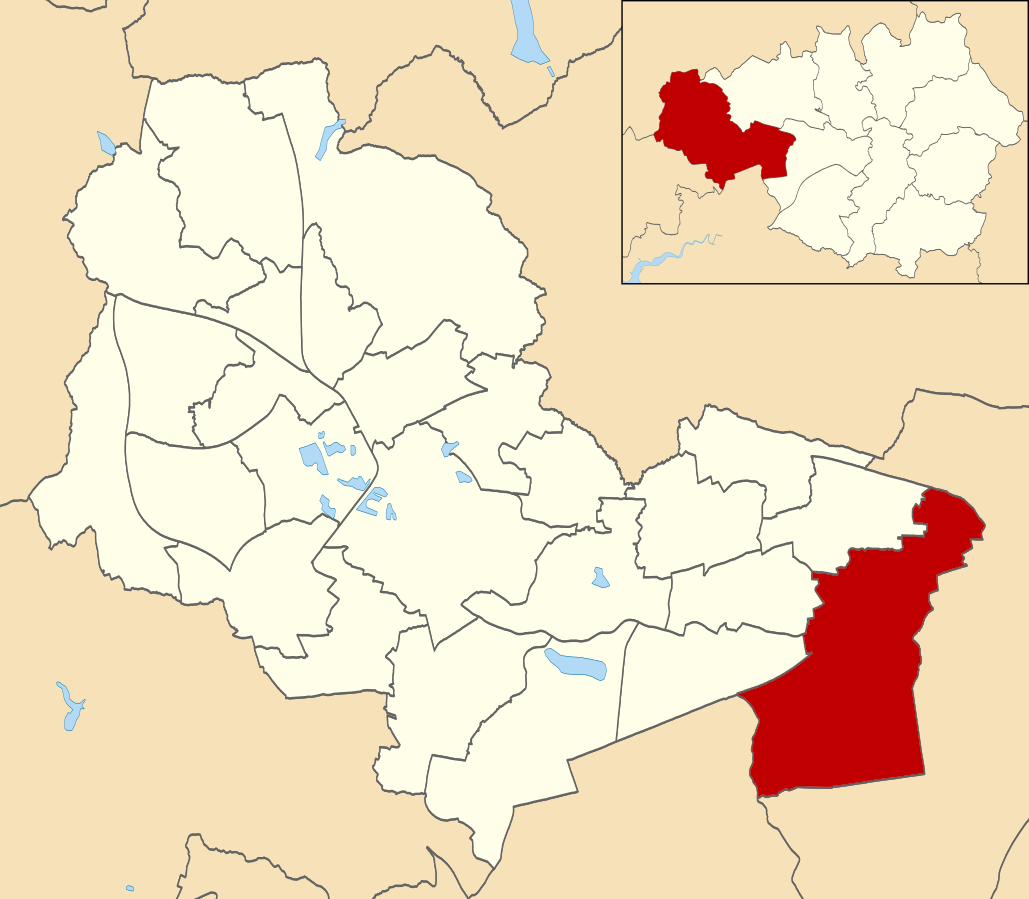
- Astley Mosley Common ward within Wigan Metropolitan Borough Council

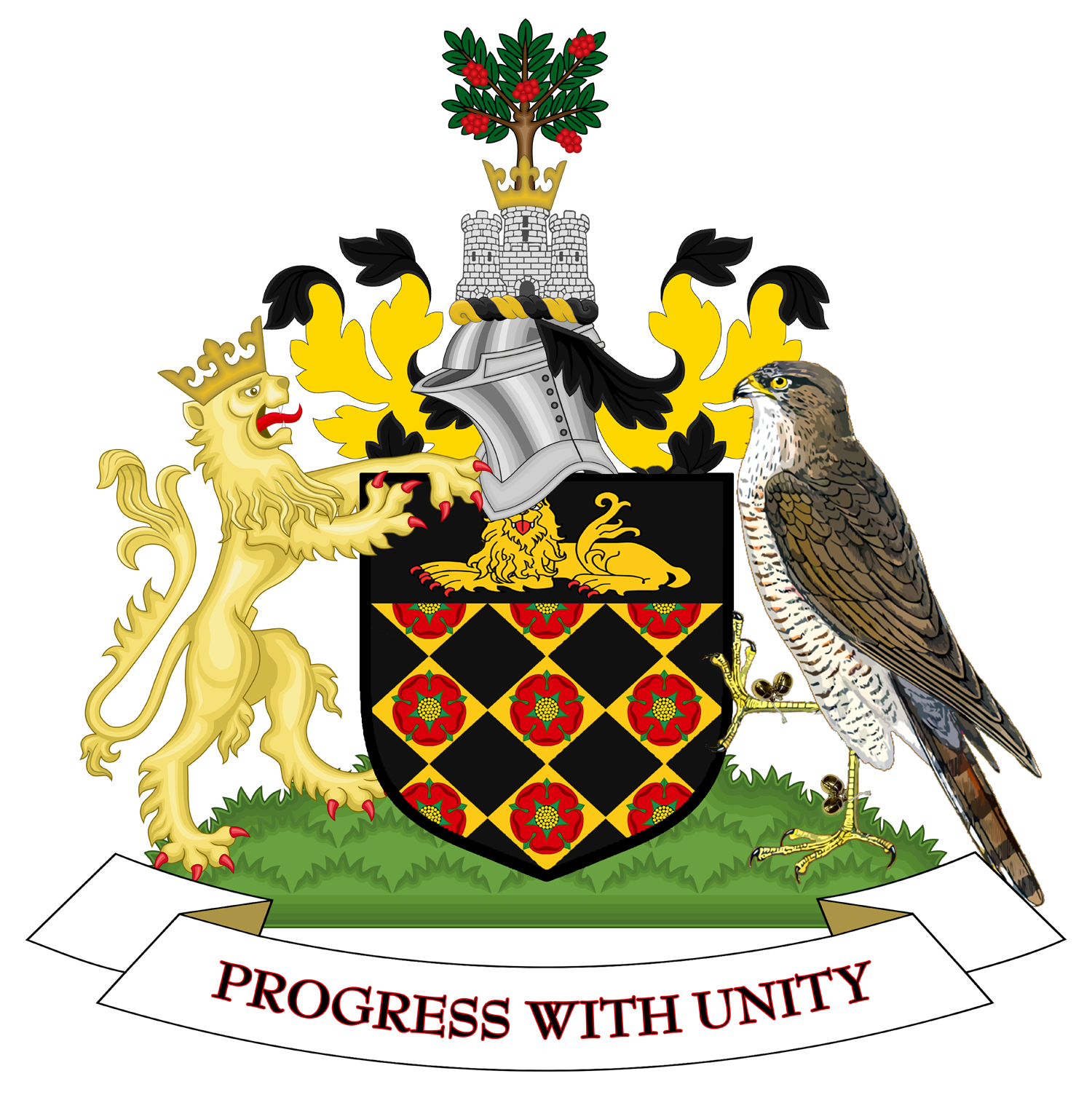
- Coat of arms
- Motto: Progress with Unity
- Interactive map of Astley Mosley Common
- Coordinates: 53.4870°N 2.4557°W
- Country: United Kingdom
- Constituent country: England
- Region: North West England
- County: Greater Manchester
- Metropolitan borough: Wigan
- Created: May 2004
- Named after: Astley and Mosley Common

Government
  - Type: Unicameral
  - Body: Wigan Metropolitan Borough Council
  - Mayor of Wigan: Sue Greensmith (Labour)
  - Councillor: Christine Roberts (Labour)
  - Councillor: Barry Taylor (Labour)
  - Councillor: Paula Wakefield (Labour)

Population
  - Total: 11,238

Astley Mosley Common is an electoral ward in Leigh, England. It forms part of Wigan Metropolitan Borough Council, as well as the parliamentary constituency of Leigh.

== Councillors ==
The ward is represented by three councillors: Christine Roberts (Lab), Barry Taylor (Lab), and Paula Wakefield (Lab).
