= Tyldesley (ward) =

- Electoral ward
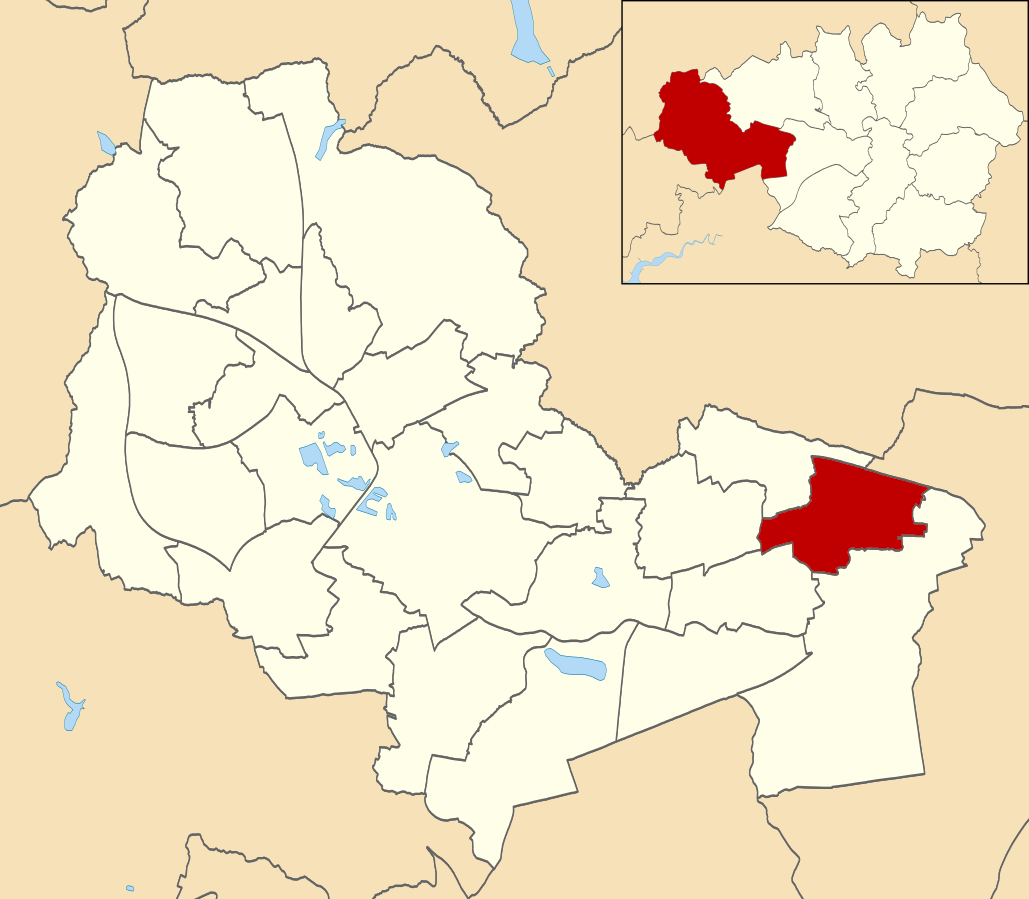
- Tyldesley ward within Wigan Metropolitan Borough Council

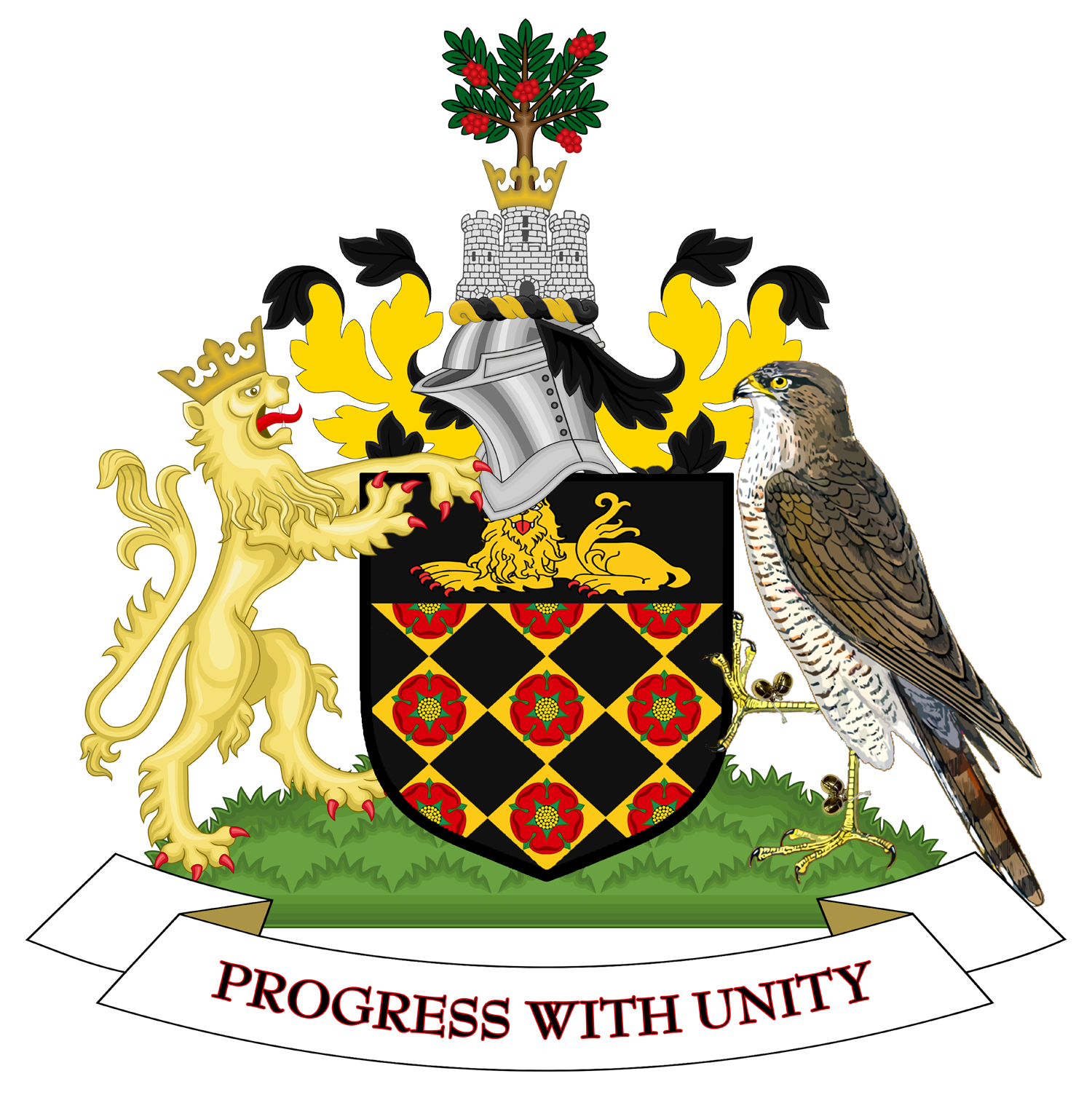
- Coat of arms
- Motto: Progress with Unity
- Interactive map of Tyldesley
- Coordinates: 53.5166°N 2.4605°W
- Country: United Kingdom
- Constituent country: England
- Region: North West England
- County: Greater Manchester
- Metropolitan borough: Wigan
- Created: May 2004
- Named for: Tyldesley

Government
  - Type: Unicameral
  - Body: Wigan Metropolitan Borough Council
  - Mayor of Wigan: Sue Greensmith (Labour)
  - Councillor: Stephen Hellier (Labour)
  - Councillor: Joanne Marshall (Labour)
  - Councillor: Nazia Rehman (Labour)

Population
  - Total: 14,826

Tyldesley is an electoral ward in Leigh, England. It forms part of Wigan Metropolitan Borough Council, as well as the parliamentary constituency of Leigh.

== Councillors ==
The ward is represented by three councillors: Stephen Hellier (Lab), Joanne Marshall (Lab), and Nazia Rehman (Lab).
