= Lowton East =

- Electoral ward
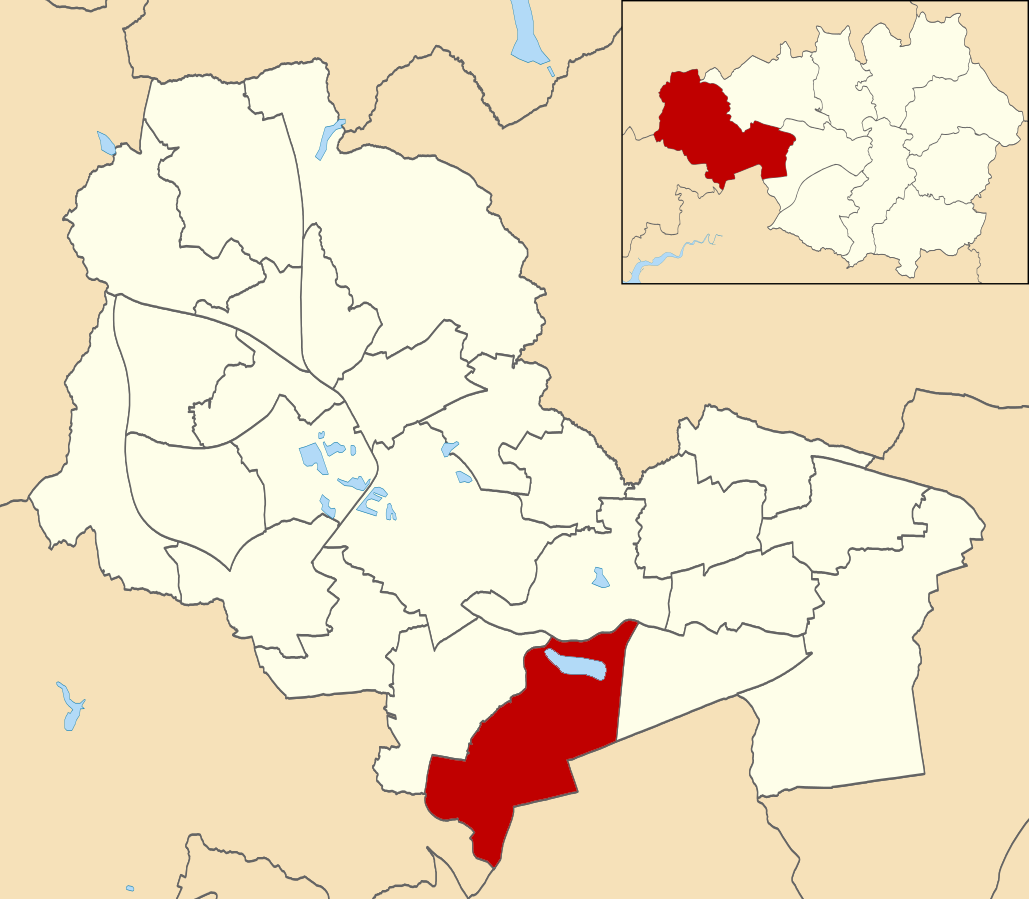
- Lowton East ward within Wigan Metropolitan Borough Council

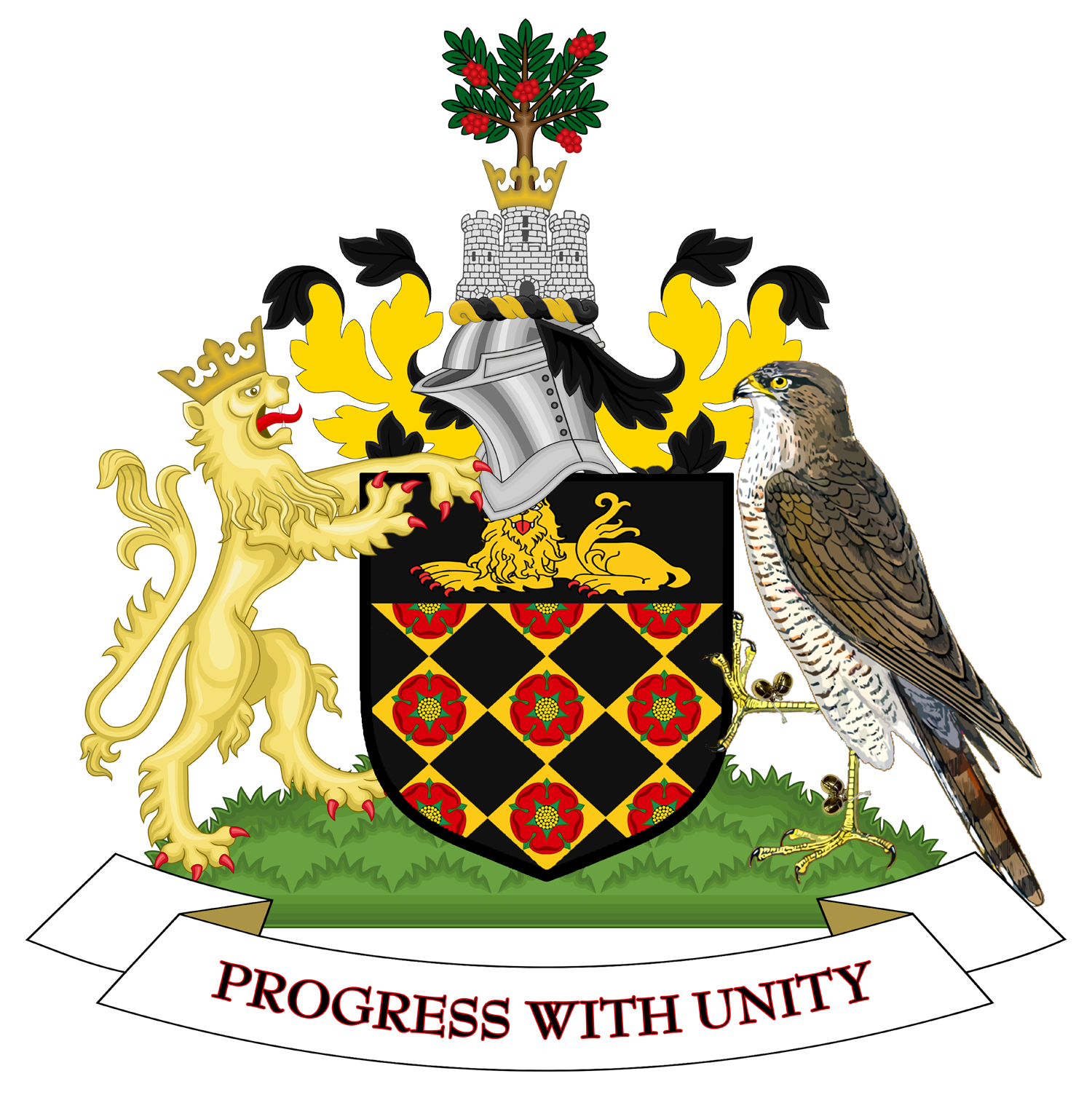
- Coat of arms
- Motto: Progress with Unity
- Interactive map of Lowton East
- Coordinates: 53.4721°N 2.5636°W
- Country: United Kingdom
- Constituent country: England
- Region: North West England
- County: Greater Manchester
- Metropolitan borough: Wigan
- Created: May 2004
- Named for: Lowton

Government
  - Type: Unicameral
  - Body: Wigan Metropolitan Borough Council
  - Mayor of Wigan: Jenny Bullen
  - Councillor: Jenny Gregory (Labour)
  - Councillor: Garry Lloyd (Labour)
  - Councillor: Mike Smith (Labour)

Population
  - Total: 12,685

Lowton East is an electoral ward in Leigh, England. It forms part of Wigan Metropolitan Borough Council, as well as the parliamentary constituency of Leigh.

== Councillors ==
As of May 2024, the ward is represented by three Labour Councillors, Jenny Gregory and Garry Lloyd and Mike Smith.

James Grundy, who in 2019 became the Conservative MP for the constituency was previously a councillor in the ward having been first elected to Lowton East in 2008.
