= Bryn (ward) =

- Electoral ward
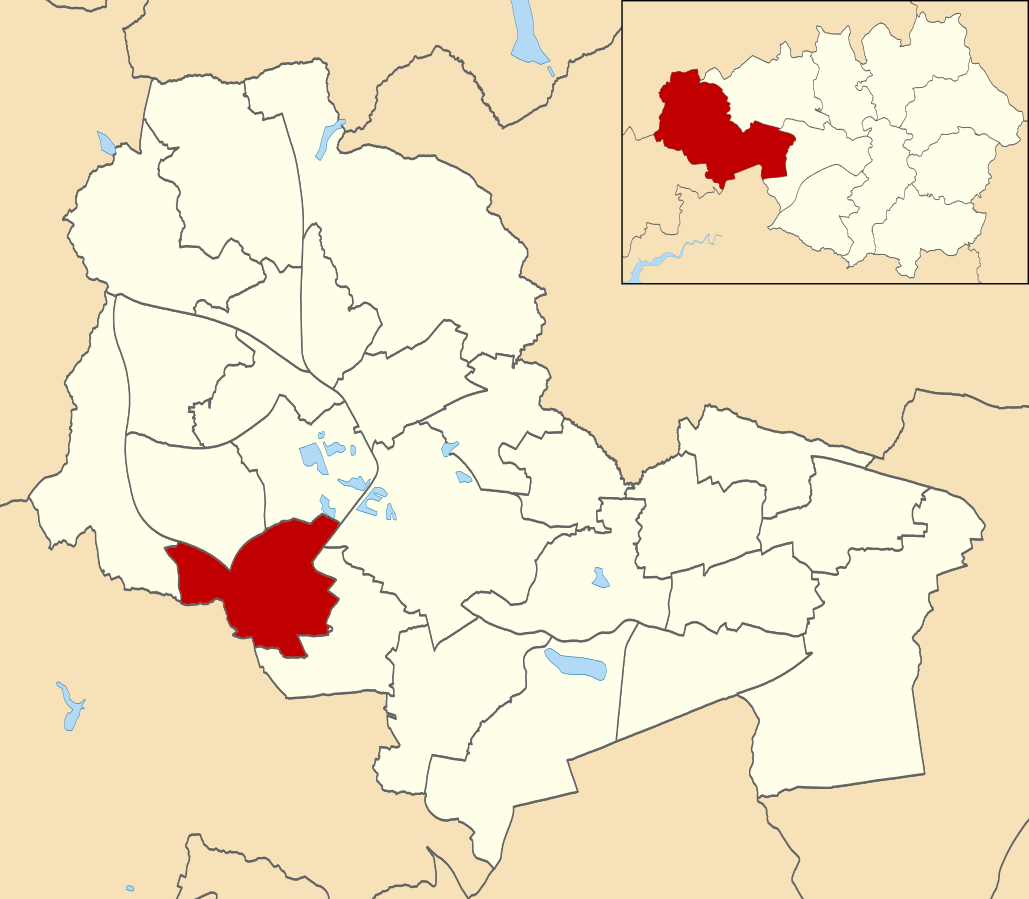
- Bryn ward within Wigan Metropolitan Borough Council

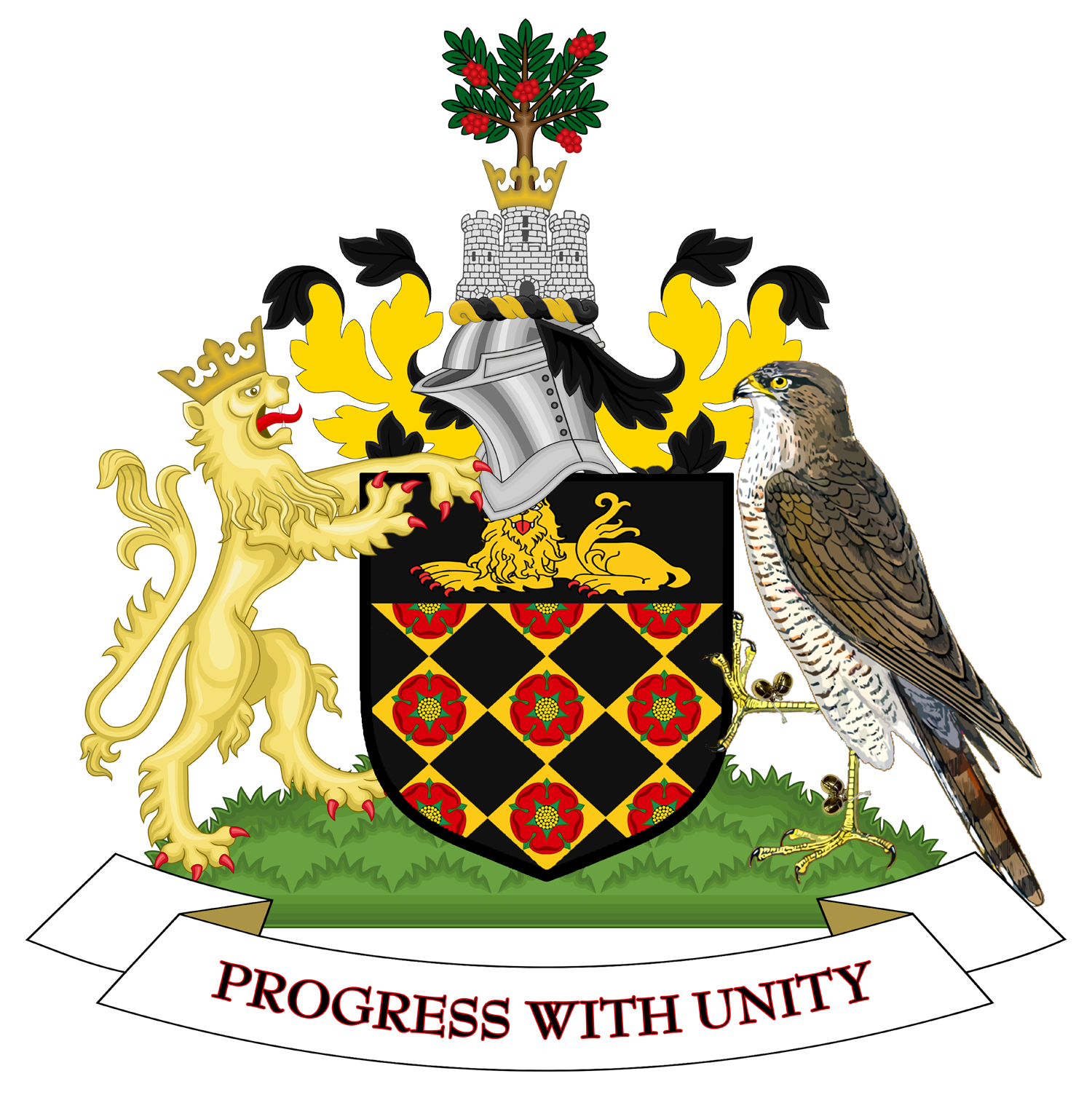
- Coat of arms
- Motto: Progress with Unity
- Interactive map of Bryn
- Country: United Kingdom
- Constituent country: England
- Region: North West England
- County: Greater Manchester
- Metropolitan borough: Wigan
- Created: May 2004
- Named after: Bryn

Government
  - Type: Unicameral
  - Body: Wigan Metropolitan Borough Council
  - Mayor of Wigan: Kevin Anderson (Labour)
  - Councillor: Sylvia Wilkinson (Independent)
  - Councillor: Steve Jones (Independent)
  - Councillor: Scarlett Myler (Independent)

Population
  - Total: 11,437

Bryn with Ashton-in-Makerfield North is an electoral ward in Wigan, England. It forms part of Wigan Metropolitan Borough Council, as well as the parliamentary constituency of Makerfield and the town of Ashton in Makerfield.

== Councillors ==
The ward is represented by three councillors: Scarlett Myler (Ind), Steve Jones (Ind) and Sylvia Wilkinson (Ind).

== Elections ==
=== Bryn with Ashton-in-Makerfield North ===
Local Elections 2023: Bryn
Party	Candidate	Votes	%	±%
Independent	Steve Jones*	1,485	60.4	
Independent	Sylvia Wilkinson*	1,122	45.7	
Independent	Scarlett Rose Myler	1,087	44.2	
Labour	Margaret Therese Gaffney	670	27.3	
Labour	Samantha Joyce Lloyd	626	25.5	
Labour	Sandra Mary Swift	599	24.4	
Independent	John Cookson	551	22.4	
Conservative	Marie Winstanley	166	6.8	
Turnout		2,457	27.4	▼2.6
Independent hold		Swing		
Independent hold		Swing		
Independent gain from Labour		Swing		

Local Elections 2022: Bryn
Party	Candidate	Votes	%	±%
Independent	Steve Jones	1,772	66.9	New
Labour	David Josiah Aitchison	691	26.1	▼13.8
Conservative	Sandip Navnit Tailor	128	4.8	▼3.3
Liberal Democrats	Stuart David Thomas	58	2.2	▼0.6
Majority		1,081	40.8	N/A
Turnout		2,649	30.0	▲2.4
Independent gain from Independent		Swing		

By-election: Bryn, 25 November 2021
Party	Candidate	Votes	%	±%
Labour	Samuel Flemming	429	31.2	▲8.2
Independent	James Alan Richardson	412	30.0	New
Independent	Gareth William Fairhurst	353	25.7	New
Conservative	Paul Martin	142	10.3	▲2.1
Liberal Democrats	David John Burley	38	2.8	▲1.1
Majority		17	1.2	N/A
Turnout		1,374	15.0	▼19.7
Labour gain from Independent		Swing		

Local Elections 2021: Bryn
Party	Candidate	Votes	%	±%
Independent	Steve Jones	2,047	67.0	▲25.9
Labour	Mary Gwendoline Callaghan	703	23.0	▼15.4
Conservative	Judith Atherton	252	8.3	▲2.8
Liberal Democrats	Denise Melling	51	1.7	New
Majority		1,344	44.0	▲41.3
Turnout		3,053	34.7	▲1.1
Independent hold		Swing		
