= Ashton (ward) =

Electoral ward in Ashton in Makerfield, England

Ashton-in-Makerfield South (ward)
- Electoral ward
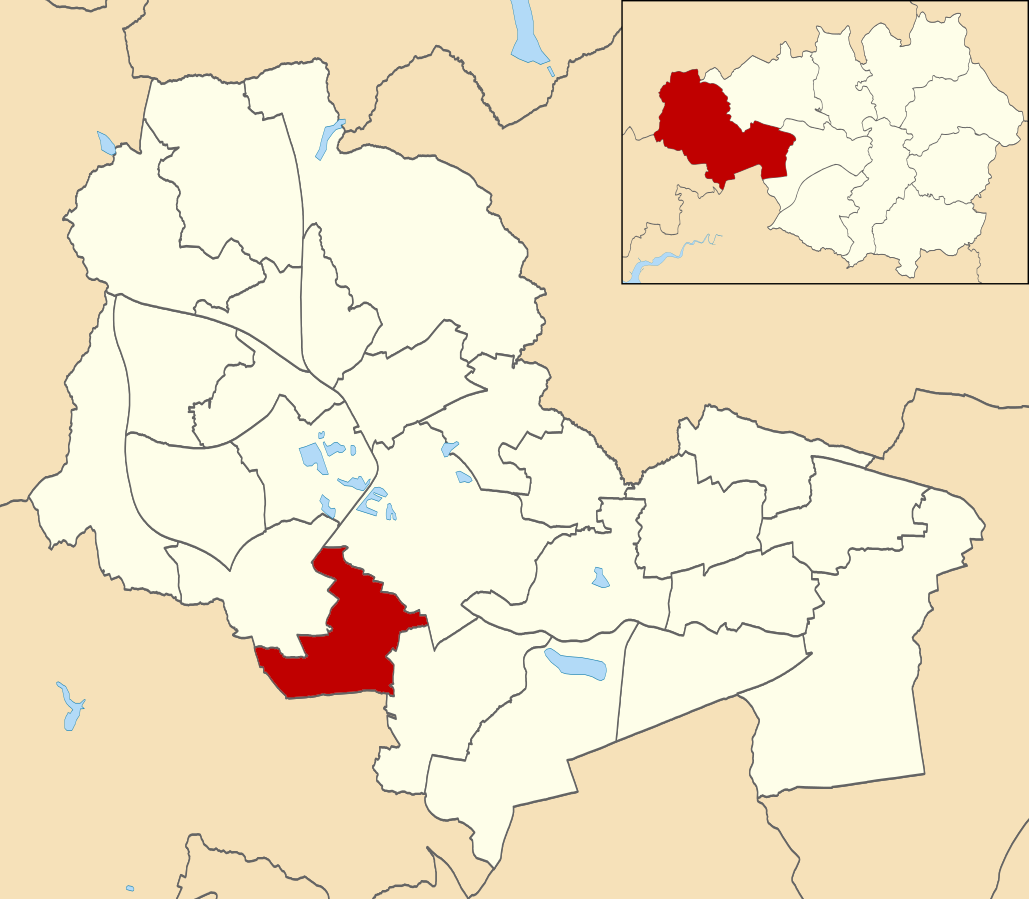
- Ashton ward within Wigan Metropolitan Borough Council

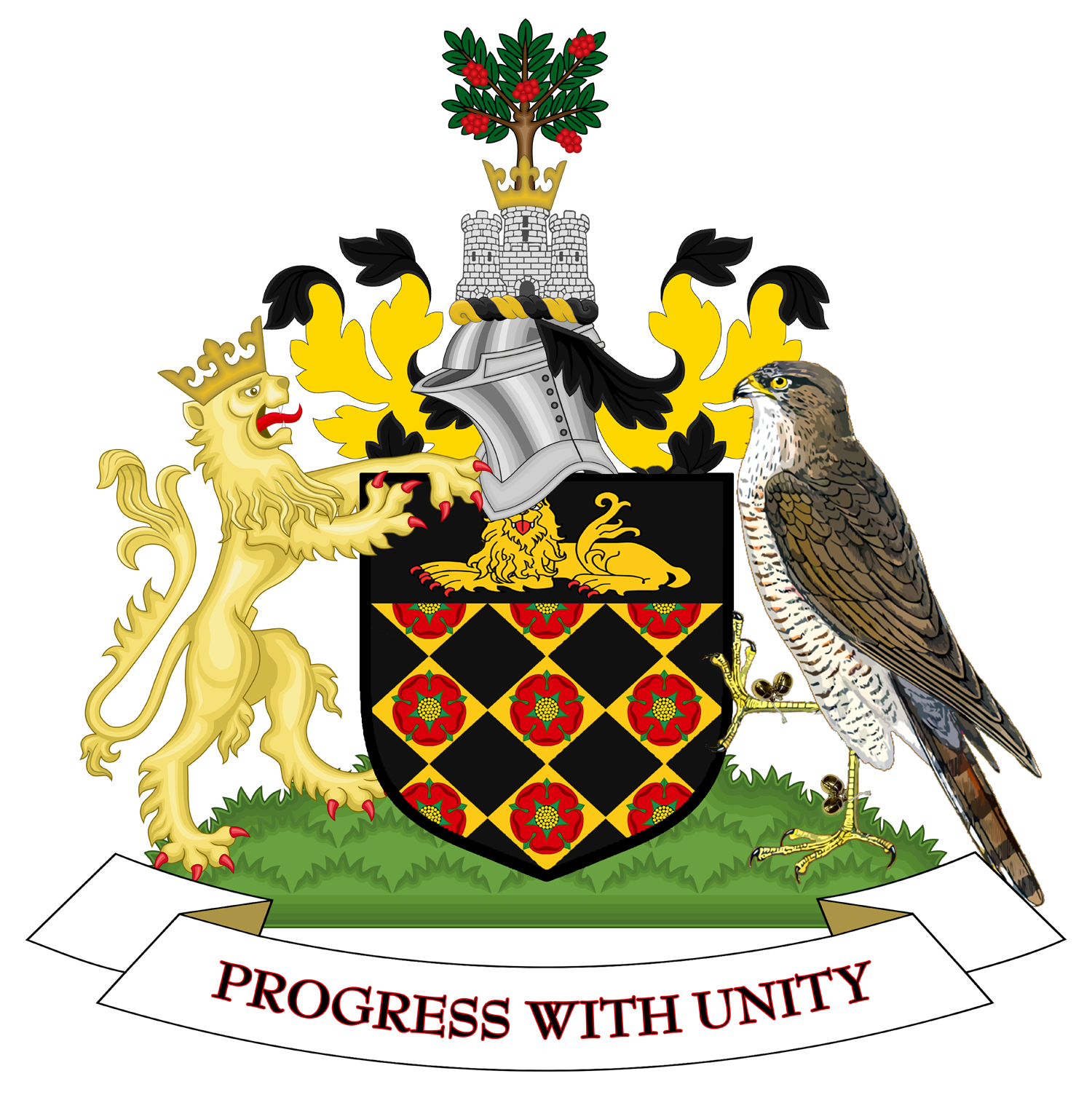
- Coat of arms
- Motto: Progress with Unity
- Country: United Kingdom
- Constituent country: England
- Region: North West England
- County: Greater Manchester
- Metropolitan borough: Wigan
- Created: May 2004
- Named after: Ashton-in-Makerfield

Government
  - Type: Unicameral
  - Body: Wigan Metropolitan Borough Council
  - Mayor of Wigan: Kevin Anderson Labour)
  - Councillor: Jenny Bullen (Labour)
  - Councillor: Danny Fletcher (Labour)
  - Councillor: Andrew Bullen (Labour)

Population
  - Total: 12,008

Ashton-in-Makerfield South is an electoral ward in Ashton in Makerfield, England. It forms part of Wigan Metropolitan Borough Council, as well as part of the parliamentary constituency of Makerfield.

== Councillors ==
The ward is represented by three councillors; Jenny Bullen (Lab), Danny Fletcher (Lab), and Andrew Bullen (Lab)
