= 2024 Wigan Metropolitan Borough Council election =

2024 English local election

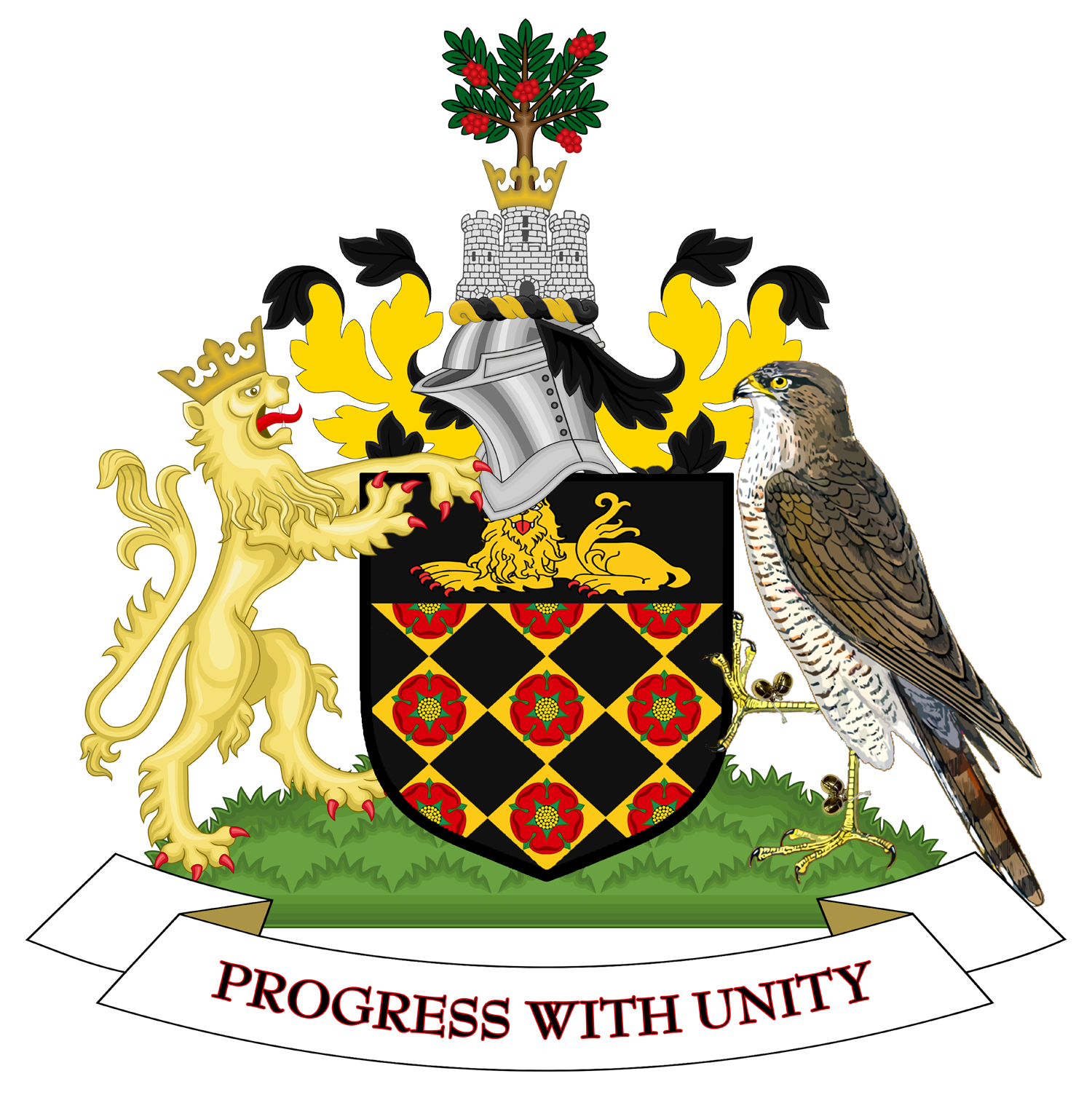
- 2 May 2024

25 out of 75 seats to Wigan Metropolitan Borough Council 38 seats needed for a majority

	First party	Second party	Third party
Leader	David Molyneux	Cllr james Paul Watson	Ray Whittingham
Party	Labour	Community Independent Alliance	Conservative
Last election	64	5
Seats before	64	5	2
Seats won	23	1	0
Seats after	64	6	1
Seat change	Steady	▲1	▼1
Popular vote	39,940	11,918	10,200
Percentage	51.7%	17.6%	15.1%
Swing	▲9.2%	▲4.9%	▼2.2%
- Winner of each seat at the 2024 Wigan Metropolitan Borough Council election
Leader before election
David Molyneux
Labour
Leader after election
David Molyneux
Labour

The 2024 Wigan Metropolitan Borough Council election took place on 2 May 2024 to elect one third of the members of Wigan Metropolitan Borough Council in England. The election was held on the same day as other local elections.

== Overview ==
The council remained under Labour majority control. Labour won a seat from the Conservatives, who were left with only one seat after the election. Labour also lost one seat to an independent candidate, leaving their overall total number of seats unchanged.

=== Council composition ===
After 2023 election		Before 2024 election		After 2024 election	
Party	Seats	Party	Seats	Party	Seats
Labour	64	Labour	64	Labour	64
Conservative	2	Conservative	2	Conservative	1
Ind. Network	4	Ind. Network	4	Ind. Network	4
Independent	5	Independent	5	Independent	6

=== Number of Candidates fielded per party ===
Source:

== Results summary ==
2024 Wigan Metropolitan Borough Council election
Party	This election				Full council			This election		
Party	Candidates	Seats	Net	Seats %	Other	Total	Total %	Votes	Votes %	+/−
Labour	{{{candidates}}}	21	Steady	84.0	43	64	85.3	34,940	51.7	–9.2
Independent	{{{candidates}}}	2	▲1	8.0	4	6	8.0	6,777	10.0	+0.5
Ind. Network	{{{candidates}}}	2	Steady	8.0	2	4	5.3	5,141	7.6	+1.8
Conservative	{{{candidates}}}	0	▼1	0.0	1	1	1.3	10,200	15.1	–2.2
Leigh and Atherton Independents	{{{candidates}}}	0	Steady	0.0	0	0	0.0	2,610	3.9	+1.7
Reform	{{{candidates}}}	0	Steady	0.0	0	0	0.0	2,152	3.2	+2.6
Liberal Democrats	{{{candidates}}}	0	Steady	0.0	0	0	0.0	1,848	2.7	–1.5
Green	{{{candidates}}}	0	Steady	0.0	0	0	0.0	1,789	2.6	+2.3
Standish Independents	{{{candidates}}}	0	Steady	0.0	0	0	0.0	1,294	1.9	+1.4
Wigan Independents	{{{candidates}}}	0	Steady	0.0	0	0	0.0	684	1.0	+0.3
Workers Party	{{{candidates}}}	0	Steady	0.0	0	0	0.0	137	0.2	N/A

== Ward results ==
Incumbent councillors seeking re-election in their ward are marked with an asterisk (*). Vote Share changes for Incumbent Councillors are relative to their own result in 2023. For non-incumbent candidates it is relative to their highest result in 2023.

=== Abram ward ===
Local Elections 2024: Abram
Party	Candidate	Votes	%	±%
Labour	Nazia Tabussam Rehman*	1,353	56.3	▲7.2
Independent	David William Bowker	746	31.0	▲1.6
Conservative	Janet Elizabeth Walch	191	7.9	▼9.3
Liberal Democrats	Graham Trevor Suddick	114	4.7	▼11.7
Majority		607	25.3	▲5.6
Turnout		2,404	22.9	▲1.8
Labour hold		Swing		

=== Ashton-in-Makerfield South ward ===
Local Elections 2024: Ashton-in-Makerfield South
Party	Candidate	Votes	%	±%
Labour	Andrew John Bullen*	1,259	52.1	▲10.2
Independent	Gary Wilkes	850	35.2	▲4.2
Conservative	Paul Martin	260	10.8	▼6.3
Liberal Democrats	Geoffrey Stephen Matthews	47	1.9	▼4.4
Majority		409	16.9	▲6.0
Turnout		2,416	27.6	▲0.7
Labour hold		Swing		

=== Aspull, New Springs & Whelley ward ===
Local Elections 2024: Aspull, New Springs & Whelley
Party	Candidate	Votes	%	±%
Labour	Laura Jean Flynn*	1,734	64.9	▲2.5
Conservative	Marie Winstanley	533	19.9	▼1.5
Green	Peter George Edmund Kitts	406	15.2	New
Majority		1,201	45.0	▲4.0
Turnout		2,673	29.1	▲1.2
Labour hold		Swing		

=== Astley ward ===
Local Elections 2024: Astley
Party	Candidate	Votes	%	±%
Labour	Barry John Taylor*	1,792	52.6	▲1.5
Ind. Network	Sandra Elizabeth Robinson	862	25.3	New
Conservative	Eileen Patricia Strathearn	753	22.1	▼11.3
Majority		930	27.3	▲9.6
Turnout		3,407	32.1	▲2.6
Labour hold		Swing		

=== Atherton North ward ===
Local Elections 2024: Atherton North
Party	Candidate	Votes	%	±%
Ind. Network	James Paul Watson*	1,070	38.7	▼2.7
Labour	Paul Blinkhorn	1,033	37.4	▲4.1
Atherton North Independent	Quinton John Smith	533	19.3	▲6.4
Conservative	David John Stirzaker	127	4.6	▼2.3
Majority		37	1.3	▼6.8
Turnout		2,763	27.1	▲0.5
Ind. Network hold		Swing		

=== Atherton South & Lilford ward ===
Local Elections 2024: Atherton South & Lilford
Party	Candidate	Votes	%	±%
Labour	Lee Robert McStein*	1,418	48.3	▲4.7
Ind. Network	Rachael Flaszczak	1,152	39.2	▲6.6
Conservative	Martin James Farrimond	368	12.5	▼1.7
Majority		266	9.1	▼1.9
Turnout		2,938	28.5	▲1.8
Labour hold		Swing		

=== Bryn with Ashton-in-Makerfield North ward ===
Local Elections 2024: Bryn with Ashton-in-Makerfield North
Party	Candidate	Votes	%	±%
Independent	Scarlett Myler*	1,512	60.1	▲15.9
Labour	Margaret Therese Gaffney	859	34.2	▲6.9
Conservative	Judith Atherton	143	5.7	▼1.1
Majority		653	25.9	▲9.0
Turnout		2,514	28.0	▲0.6
Independent hold		Swing		

=== Douglas ward ===
Local Elections 2024: Douglas
Party	Candidate	Votes	%	±%
Labour	Matt Dawber*	1,379	69.7	▲8.5
Green	Peter Ernest Jacobs	304	15.4	▼6.2
Conservative	Margaret Atherton	296	15.0	▼4.7
Majority		1,075	54.3	▲14.7
Turnout		1,979	21.1	▲0.9
Labour hold		Swing		

=== Golborne & Lowton West ward ===
Local Elections 2024: Golborne & Lowton West
Party	Candidate	Votes	%	±%
Labour	Susan Gambles*	1,572	63.4	▲6.4
Leigh and Atherton Independent	Richard Andrew Scott	420	16.9	New
Conservative	Edward Noel Houlton	387	15.6	▼4.3
Liberal Democrats	Andrew Julian Lee Holland	101	4.1	▼4.0
Majority		1,152	46.5	▲9.4
Turnout		2,480	26.9	▲1.5
Labour hold		Swing		

=== Hindley ward ===
Local Elections 2024: Hindley
Party	Candidate	Votes	%	±%
Labour	James Talbot*	1,013	42.4	▼0.4
Ind. Network	Jim Ellis	519	21.7	▼12.6
Reform	James Swift	315	13.2	New
Independent	Jordan James Gaskell	201	8.4	New
Independent	Dave Culshaw	102	4.3	▼15.9
Green	Oliver Peter Clark	97	4.1	New
Conservative	Gerard Joseph Houlton	89	3.7	▼4.7
Liberal Democrats	John Charles Skipworth	54	2.3	▼5.6
Majority		494	20.7	▲12.2
Turnout		2,390	24.2	▲0.5
Labour hold		Swing		

=== Hindley Green ward ===
Local Elections 2024: Hindley Green
Party	Candidate	Votes	%	±%
Labour	James Thomas Palmer*	1,260	49.7	▲3.7
Independent	Mark Prescott	701	27.6	▲0.1
Reform	Ray Peters	392	15.5	New
Conservative	Susan Atherton	131	5.2	▼9.7
Liberal Democrats	Gary Skipworth	53	2.1	▼6.6
Majority		559	22.1	▲3.6
Turnout		2,537	27.6	▲1.2
Labour hold		Swing		

=== Ince ward ===
Local Elections 2024: Ince
Party	Candidate	Votes	%	±%
Independent	Tony Whyte	1,018	46.7	New
Labour	Janice Sharratt*	970	44.5	▲5.7
Conservative	Allan Atherton	155	7.1	▼6.2
Independent	Zoran C. Zok	37	1.7	New
Majority		48	2.2	N/A
Turnout		2,180	23.2	▲0.7
Independent gain from Labour		Swing		

=== Leigh Central & Higher Folds ward ===
Local Elections 2024: Leigh Central & Higher Folds
Party	Candidate	Votes	%	±%
Labour	Fred Walker*	1,321	52.2	▼1.2
Leigh Central Independent	James Edward Morley	626	24.8	▲5.7
Conservative	Jean Dickinson	296	11.7	▼6.2
Green	Peter Mulleady	214	8.5	New
Liberal Democrats	Stuart John Worthington	72	2.8	▼3.8
Majority		695	27.4	▼6.9
Turnout		2,529	23.6	▲2.0
Labour hold		Swing		

=== Leigh South ward ===
Local Elections 2024: Leigh South
Party	Candidate	Votes	%	±%
Labour	Charles Rigby*	1,474	51.7	▼0.8
Leigh South Independent	Jayson Allan Hargreaves	556	19.5	New
Conservative	Avril Ruth Murphy	495	17.4	▼11.6
Liberal Democrats	Christopher John Noon	192	6.7	▼11.0
Green	Brodie Andrew Prescott	133	4.7	New
Majority		918	32.2	▲8.7
Turnout		2,850	30.0	▲1.7
Labour hold		Swing		

=== Leigh West ward ===
Local Elections 2024: Leigh West
Party	Candidate	Votes	%	±%
Labour	Sue Greensmith*	1,592	60.6	▲3.0
Leigh West Independent	David John Evans	475	18.1	▲2.0
Conservative	Marie Elizabeth Cooper	314	12.0	▼4.8
Green	Rachel Harrop	244	9.3	New
Majority		1,117	42.5	▲1.7
Turnout		2,625	23.6	▲2.8
Labour hold		Swing		

=== Lowton East ward ===
Local Elections 2024: Lowton East
Party	Candidate	Votes	%	±%
Labour	Mike Smith	2,179	54.2	▲9.0
Conservative	Kathleen Houlton*	1,845	45.8	▼0.6
Majority		334	8.4	N/A
Turnout		4,024	36.1	▲2.1
Labour gain from Conservative		Swing		

=== Orrell ward ===
Local Elections 2024: Orrell
Party	Candidate	Votes	%	±%
Labour	Anne Collins*	1,601	52.2	▲8.0
Conservative	Michael William Winstanley	920	30.0	▼12.5
Reform	Robert F. Kenyon	423	13.8	New
Liberal Democrats	Neil Duncan Stevenson	124	4.0	▼8.5
Majority		681	22.2	▲20.5
Turnout		3,068	32.6	▲1.2
Labour hold		Swing		

=== Pemberton ward ===
Local Elections 2024: Pemberton
Party	Candidate	Votes	%	±%
Labour	Eileen Winifred Rigby*	1,179	59.5	▲11.9
Independent	Tony Porter	522	26.3	▼1.2
Conservative	Jean Margaret Peet	170	8.6	▼10.7
Liberal Democrats	David John Burley	111	5.6	▼11.6
Majority		657	33.2	▲13.1
Turnout		1,982	21.0	▲1.4
Labour hold		Swing		

=== Shevington with Lower Ground & Moor ward ===
Local Elections 2024: Shevington with Lower Ground & Moor
Party	Candidate	Votes	%	±%
Labour	Vicky Galligan*	1,585	51.4	▲9.4
Shevington Independents Part of Wigan Independents	Debbie Fairhurst	684	22.2	▼11.3
Conservative	Michael Colin Owens	500	16.2	▼5.4
Liberal Democrats	John Peter Burley	177	5.7	▼7.5
Workers Party	Peter Seddon	137	4.4	New
Majority		901	29.2	▲20.7
Turnout		3,083	31.6	▼1.8
Labour hold		Swing		

=== Standish with Langtree ward ===
Local Elections 2024: Standish with Langtree
Party	Candidate	Votes	%	±%
Labour	Terry Mugan*	1,610	43.0	▲6.5
Standish Independents	Gareth William Fairhurst	1,294	34.6	▲12.4
Conservative	Gary Robinson	724	19.3	▼17.1
Liberal Democrats	Donald John Macnamara	117	3.1	New
Majority		316	8.4	▲8.3
Turnout		3,745	32.8	▲1.2
Labour hold		Swing		

=== Tyldesley & Mosley Common ward ===
Local Elections 2024: Tyldesley & Mosley Common
Party	Candidate	Votes	%	±%
Ind. Network	James Anthony Fish*	1,538	52.4	▲13.7
Labour	Farai Nhakaniso	1,091	37.1	▼0.1
Conservative	Ashley Mccarrick	308	10.5	▼14.3
Majority		447	15.3	▲13.8
Turnout		2,937	29.6	▲3.5
Ind. Network hold		Swing		

=== Wigan Central ward ===
Local Elections 2024: Wigan Central
Party	Candidate	Votes	%	±%
Labour	Michael McLoughlin*	1,398	48.2	▼2.9
Independent	Catherine Mary Croston	790	27.3	New
Conservative	Paul John Chapman	420	14.5	▼15.5
Green	Lisa Diaz	190	6.6	New
Liberal Democrats	Brian Craig Duff Crombie-Fisher	100	3.5	▼20.5
Majority		608	20.9	▼0.2
Turnout		2,898	30.8	▲1.1
Labour hold		Swing		

=== Wigan West ward ===
Local Elections 2024: Wigan West
Party	Candidate	Votes	%	±%
Labour	Sheila Rosaleen Ramsdale*	1,639	67.9	▲19.2
Liberal Democrats	Stuart David Thomas	404	16.7	▼14.7
Conservative	Marjorie Clayton	372	15.4	▲2.5
Majority		1,235	51.2	▲33.9
Turnout		2,415	24.9	▼0.4
Labour hold		Swing		

=== Winstanley ward ===
Local Elections 2024: Winstanley
Party	Candidate	Votes	%	±%
Labour	Clive William Morgan*	1,412	57.0	▲3.9
Reform	John Carroll	490	19.8	▲1.6
Conservative	Margaret Mary Winstanley	249	10.1	▼13.9
Green	John Christopher Logan	201	8.1	New
Liberal Democrats	Robert Duncan Stevenson	124	5.0	▼16.2
Majority		922	37.2	▲8.1
Turnout		2,476	27.8	▲1.6
Labour hold		Swing		

=== Worsley Mesnes ward ===
Local Elections 2024: Worsley Mesnes
Party	Candidate	Votes	%	±%
Labour	Paul David James Molyneux*	1,217	53.9	▲7.9
Reform	Keith Andrew Whalley	532	23.6	New
Independent	Danny Cooke	298	13.2	▼16.5
Conservative	Adam James Marsh	154	6.8	▼12.9
Liberal Democrats	Vincent Dean Holgate	58	2.6	▼11.8
Majority		685	30.3	▲14.0
Turnout		2,259	25.2	▲0.8
Labour hold		Swing		

== By-elections between 2024 and 2026 ==
=== Leigh South ward ===
Leigh South, 4 July 2024
Party	Candidate	Votes	%	±%
Labour	Barbara Caren	2,389	49.3	▼8.4
Conservative	Eileen Strathearn	989	20.4	▼8.6
Leigh South Independent	Jayson Hargreaves	502	10.4	New
Independent	Craig Buckley	330	6.8	New
Liberal Democrats	Christopher Noon	326	6.7	▼11.0
Green	Brodie Prescott	305	6.3	New
Majority		1,400	28.9	
Turnout		4,841	50.6	▲22.3
Labour hold		Swing	▼0.1	

=== Wigan Central ward ===
Wigan Central by-election: 2 October 2025
Party	Candidate	Votes	%	±%
Reform	Lee Moffitt	1,391	47.2	New
Labour	Adam Boon	970	32.9	▼24.0
Wigan Independents	Gareth Fairhurst	196	6.7	New
Conservative	Paul Martin	151	5.1	▼24.9
Green	Simeon Rowlands	130	4.4	New
Liberal Democrats	John Burley	109	3.7	▼20.3
Majority		421	14.3	N/A
Turnout		2,953	30.9	▲1.2
Registered electors		9,584		
Reform gain from Labour		Swing	▲35.6	
