= Mayor of Wigan =

Mayor of the Metropolitan Borough of Wigan in the United Kingdom

The Worshipful Mayor of Wigan
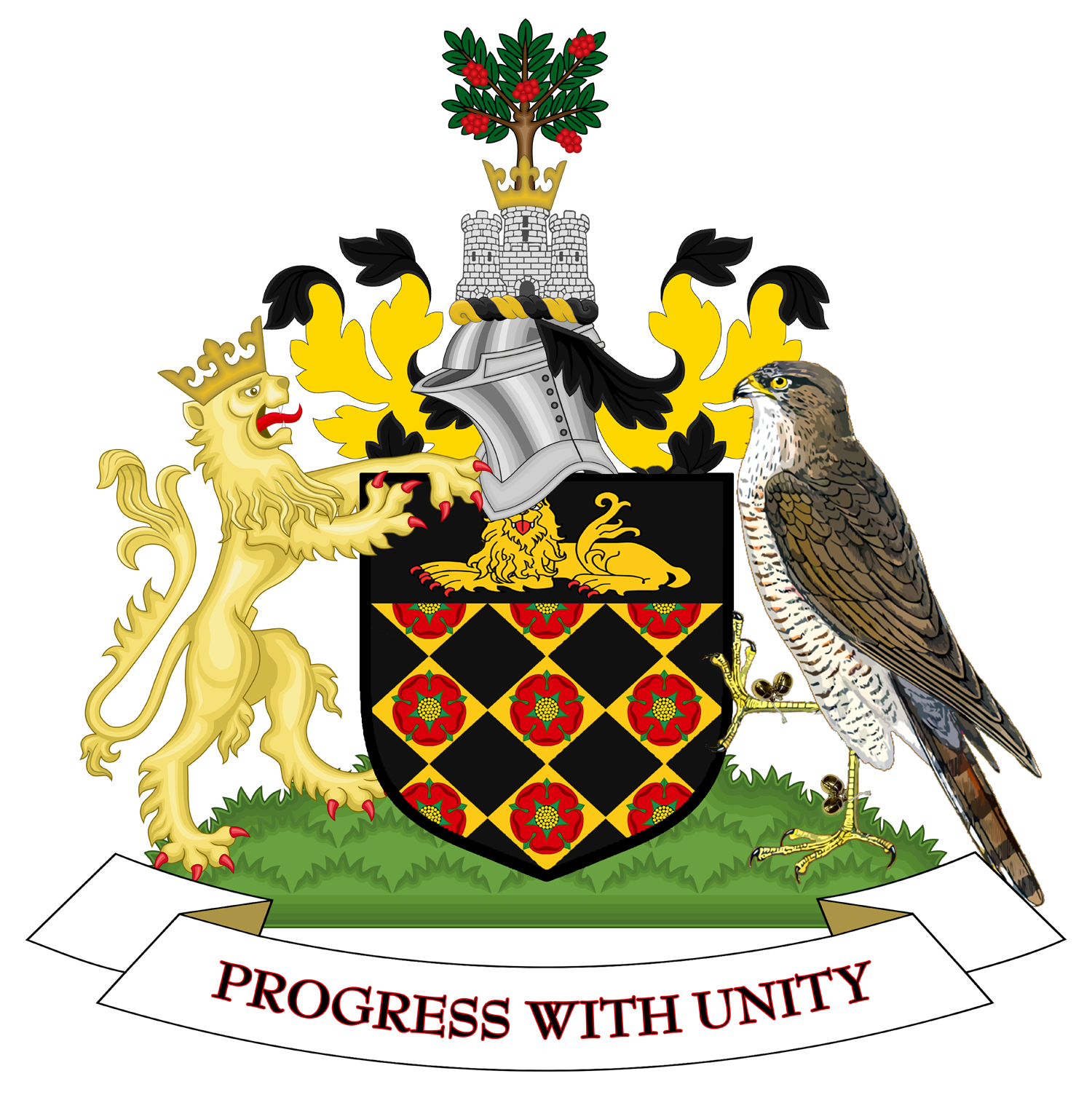
- Arms of Wigan Borough Council
- Incumbent; Anne Collins (53rd Mayor of Wigan) since 26 May 2026
- Appointer: General Assembly of the Wigan Council
- Term length: 1 year
- Inaugural holder: Robert Matthew Lyons
- Formation: Wigan Council Constitution; 1974
- Deputy: Deputy Mayor of Wigan; Susan Gambles
- Website: Office of the Mayor

The Mayor of the Metropolitan Borough of Wigan is the first citizen, chairperson of the Wigan Council and elected representative of the Wigan Borough and the Council.

== Duties of the mayor and its origins ==
The mayoralty of Wigan goes back to its first creation in 1246 AD, when Henry III granted the town its first royal charter; however, since 1974 the office of the mayor has been created by legislative statute of the Constitution of Wigan Council (Article 5, Section 1). The mayor of Wigan as the 'First Citizen' has highest precedence unless a member of the royal family is present. As the elected representative of the borough, the mayor acts as focal point for the community as well as promoting the borough and forging national and international links, which includes continuing links with the Mayor of Angers in Western France as the twinned city. The official position of the mayor and the council includes presiding over the meetings of the council, of which, if the mayor is unable to preside at the time, it is the duty of the elected deputy mayor to temporarily take his place. Wigan Town Hall in the centre of Wigan serves as the official location where the office of the mayor is located and also serves as the location for meetings of the council in the main chamber. The Town Hall of Leigh is often used by the mayor and other councillors as a second headquarters.

The position of the mayor is politically neutral and so even though the mayor remains chairman of the council, the council assembly elects itself a leader of the council who will also chair the Wigan Cabinet. The Office of the Mayor is located in the Wigan Town Hall were the Council Chamber is also located.

When in office, other duties include receiving members of the Royal Family and other state visitors, attending ceremonies and engagements of charities as representative that take place within or out of the borough. The mayor also leads the service on Remembrance Sunday at the cenotaph of Wigan Town Centre in November.

== Succession, deputy mayor, mayoress and consort ==
The deputy mayor of Wigan is elected by the council assembly as second citizen who assists the elected mayor and their consort in their duties. The deputy mayor is also first in succession to the mayoralty. The current deputy mayor is Susan Gambles.

Traditionally if the incumbent is a gentleman, the wife of the mayor would take the title of mayoress of Wigan. However, when a female mayor is elected, her husband would assume the role of mayor's consort.

== Style and title ==
Styles of The Mayor of Wigan
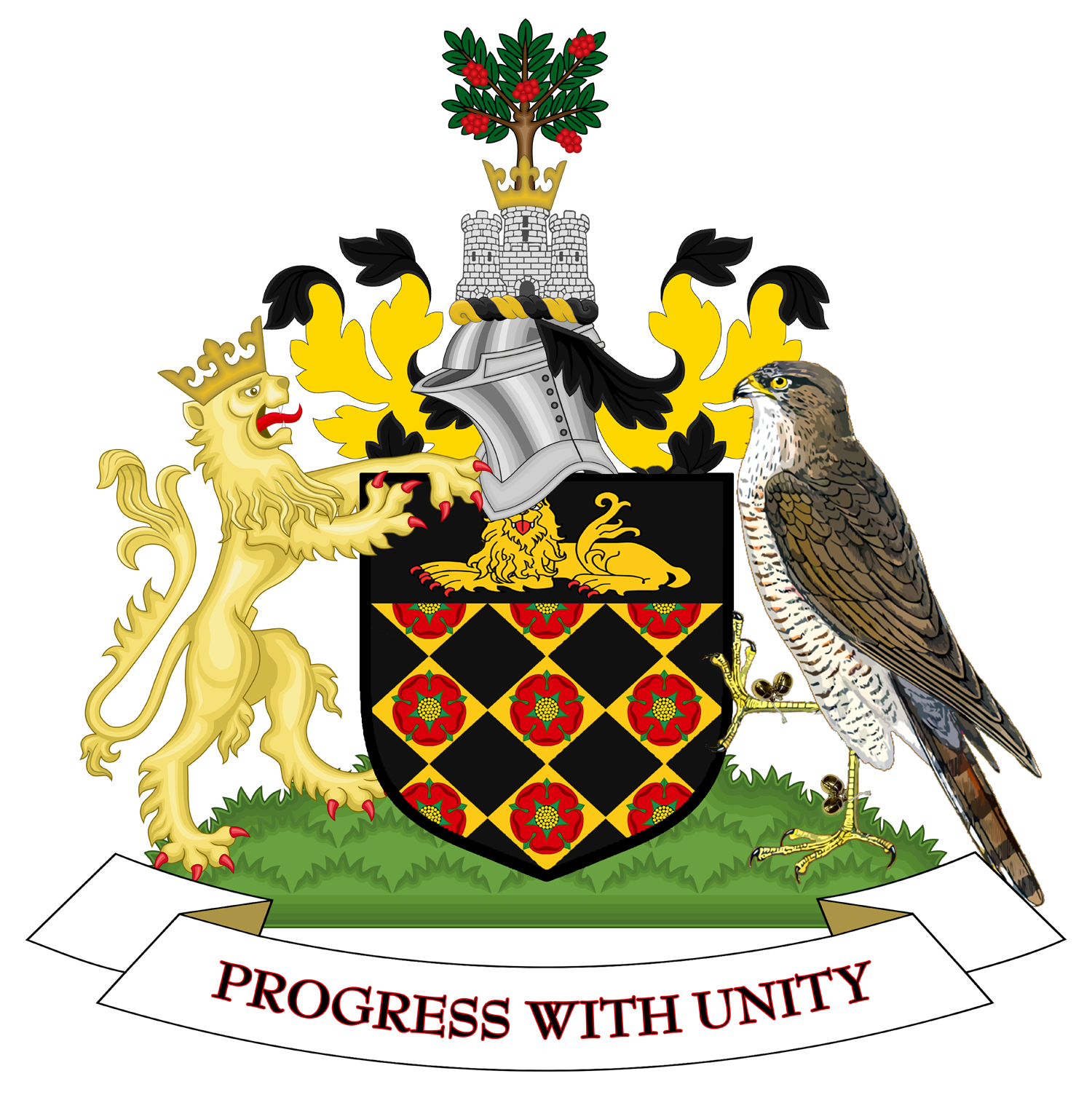
- Reference style: The Mayor of Wigan
- Spoken style: Madam, Mayor
- Alternative style: Councillor

The mayor of Wigan is entitled to the style of "The Worshipful" however the style is only used when referring to the office rather than the holder and is not retained after they have left office. The mayor is referred to in speech as "Mr. Mayor" and if a female councillor is in office they are referred to as "Madam Mayor".

The full title of the current mayor is: "The Worshipful The Mayor of Wigan Council, Councillor Anne Collins"

== List of mayors of Wigan ==
No.	Mayor	Term
1	Robert Matthew Lyons	1974–1975
2	George Macdonald	1975–1976
3	Joseph Albert Eckersley	1976–1977
4	Thomas Gerard Morgan	1977–1978
5	Leonard Sumner	1978–1979
6	Harry Milligan	1979–1980
7	William Charles Priest France	1980–1981
8	James Bridge	1981–1982
9	Thomas Jones	1982–1983
10	Thomas Isherwood	1983–1984
11	Peter Hull	1984–1985
12	George Alfred Lockett	1985–1986
13	Jack Sumner	1986–1987
14	James Jones	1987–1988
15	David Norris Caley	1988–1989
16	Audrey Bennett	1989–1990
17	Ronald McAllister.	1990–1991
18	John Horrocks	1991–1992
19	Arthur Wright	1992–1993
20	Joseph Clarke	1993–1994
21	William Stanley Simmons	1994–1995
22	Norman Bernard Holt	1995–1996
23	Anthony Bernard Coyle	1996–1997
24	Kenneth Pye	1997–1998
25	Samuel Little	1998–1999
26	(part) William Smith	1999–2000
27	(part) Evelyne Smith	1999–2000
28	Joan Hurst	2000–2001
29	John E. Hilton	2001–2002
30	Geoffrey Roberts	2002–2003
31	Wilfred Brogan	2003–2004
32	John Hilton	2004–2005
33	Brian Jarvis	2005–2006
34	Eunice Smethurst	2006–2007
35	John O'Brien	2007–2008
36	Rona Winkworth	2008–2009
37	Mark Aldred	2009–2010
38	Michael Winstanley	2010–2011
39	Joy Birch	2011–2012
40	Myra Whiteside	2012–2013
41	Billy Rotherham	2013–2014
42	Phyllis Cullen	2014–2015
43	Susan Loudon	2015–2016
44	Ronald Conway	2016–2017
45	Bill Clarke	2017–2018
46	Susan Greensmith	2018–2019
47	Stephen Dawber	2019–2021
48	Yvonne Klieve	2021–2022
49	Marie Morgan	2022–2023
50	Kevin Anderson	2023–2024
51	Debbie Parkinson	2024–2025
52	Jenny Bullen	2025–2026
53	Anne Collins	2026–2027
