= Pemberton (ward) =

- Electoral ward
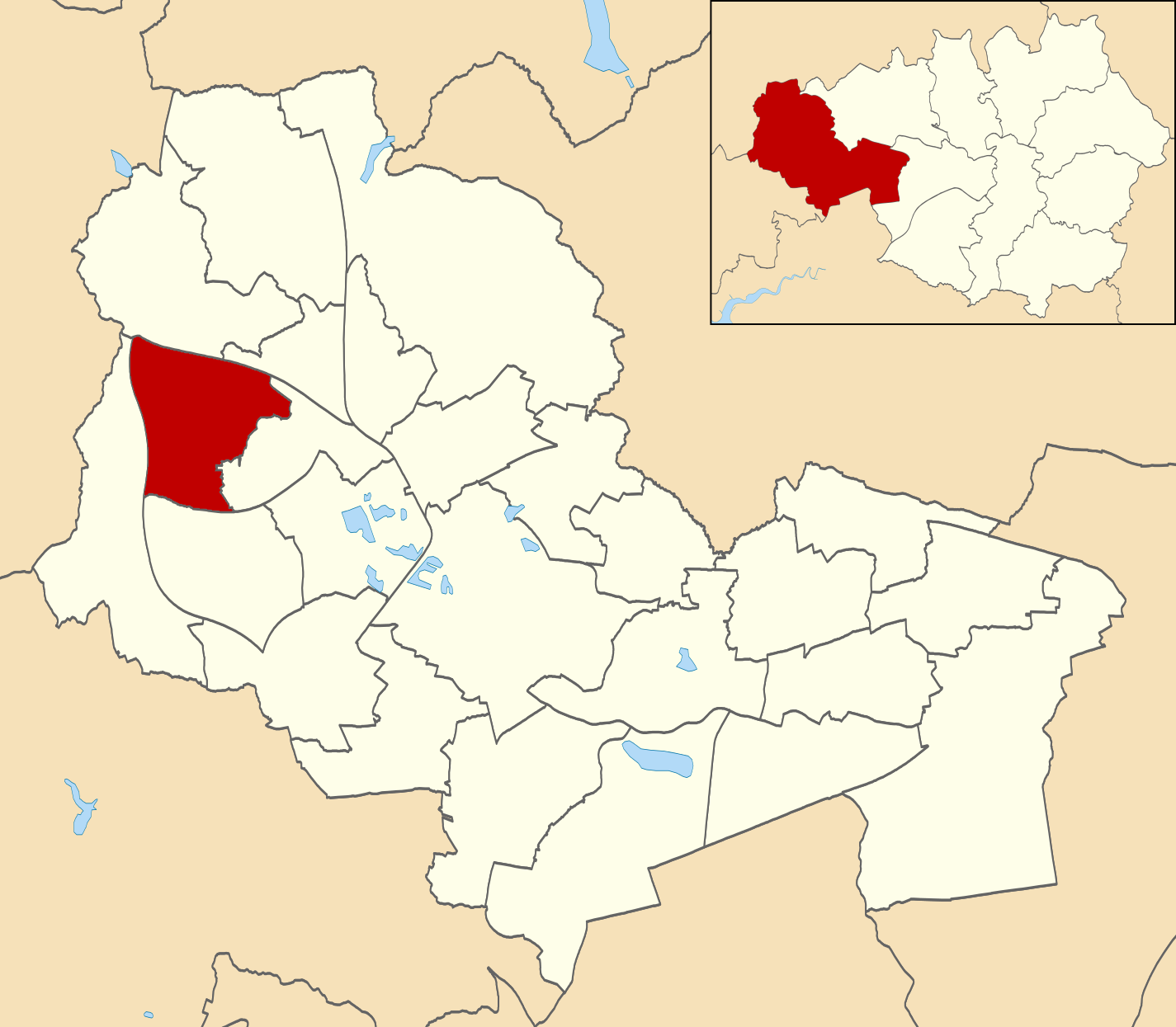
- Pemberton ward within Wigan Metropolitan Borough Council

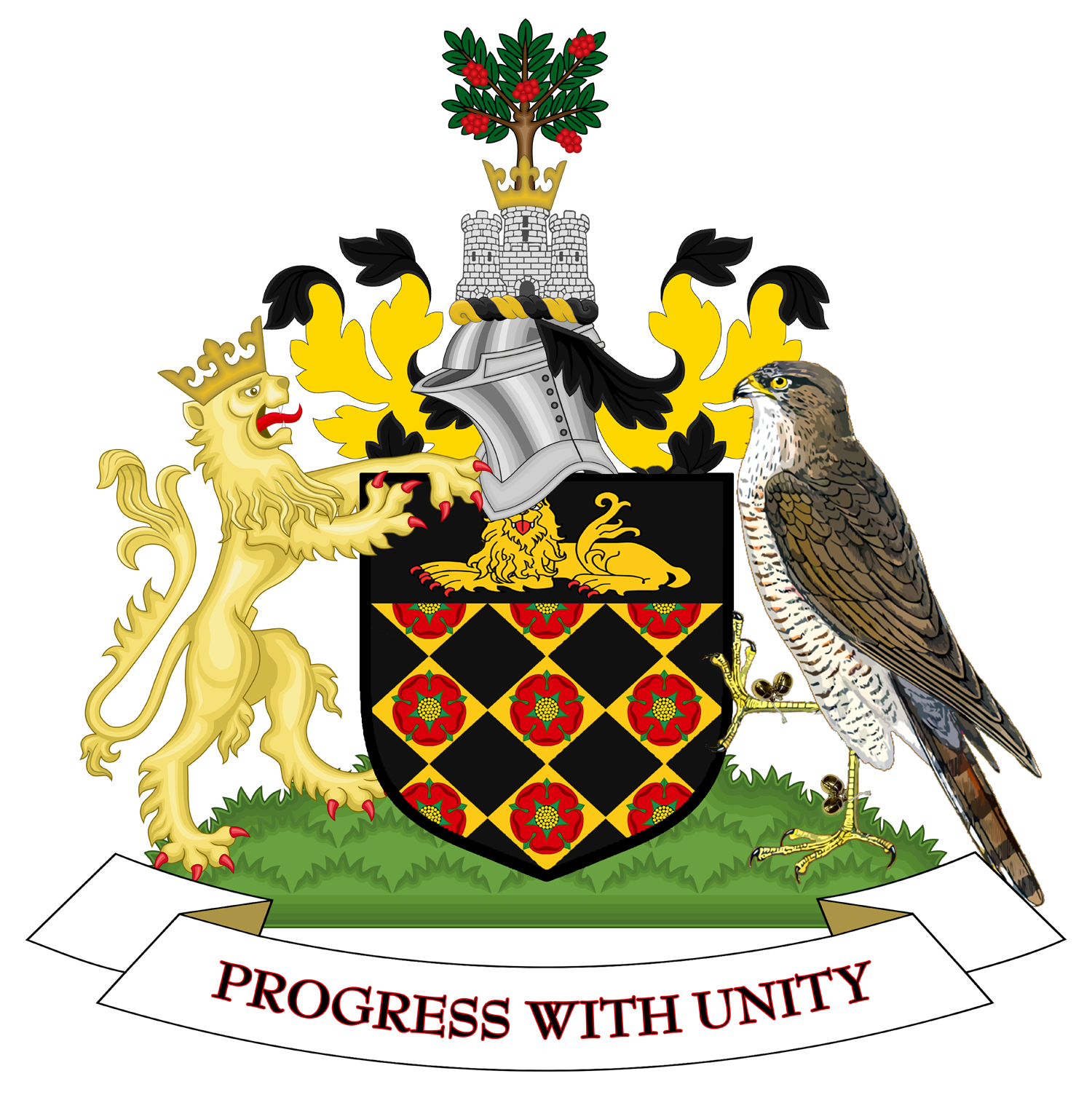
- Coat of arms
- Motto: Progress with Unity
- Country: United Kingdom
- Constituent country: England
- Region: North West England
- County: Greater Manchester
- Metropolitan borough: Wigan
- Created: May 2004
- Named for: Pemberton

Government
  - Type: Unicameral
  - Body: Wigan Metropolitan Borough Council
  - Mayor of Wigan: Anne Collins (Labour)
  - Councillor: Jeanette Prescott (Labour)
  - Councillor: Simon Silcock (Reform)
  - Councillor: Eileen Rigby (Labour)

Population
  - Total: 14,656

Pemberton is an electoral ward in Wigan, England. It forms part of Wigan Metropolitan Borough Council, as well as the parliamentary constituency of Wigan.

== Councillors ==
The ward is represented by three councillors: Jeanette Prescott (Lab), Simon Silcock (Ref), and Eileen Rigby (Lab).

Election	Councillor	Councillor	Councillor
2004	Paul Prescott (Lab)	Barbara Bourne (Lab)	Jeanette Prescott (Lab)
2006	Paul Prescott (Lab)	Barbara Bourne (Lab)	Jeanette Prescott (Lab)
2007	Paul Prescott (Lab)	Barbara Bourne (Lab)	Jeanette Prescott (Lab)
2008	Paul Prescott (Lab)	Barbara Bourne (Lab)	Jeanette Prescott (Lab)
2010	Paul Prescott (Lab)	Barbara Bourne (Lab)	Jeanette Prescott (Lab)
2011	Paul Prescott (Lab)	Barbara Bourne (Lab)	Jeanette Prescott (Lab)
2012	Paul Prescott (Lab)	Barbara Bourne (Lab)	Jeanette Prescott (Lab)
By-election, 4 April 2013	Paul Prescott (Lab)	Sam Murphy (Lab)	Jeanette Prescott (Lab)
2014	Paul Prescott (Lab)	Sam Murphy (Lab)	Jeanette Prescott (Lab)
2015	Paul Prescott (Lab)	Sam Murphy (Lab)	Jeanette Prescott (Lab)
2016	Paul Prescott (Lab)	Sam Murphy (Lab)	Jeanette Prescott (Lab)
2018	Paul Prescott (Lab)	Sam Murphy (Lab)	Jeanette Prescott (Lab)
2019	Paul Prescott (Lab)	Eileen Rigby (Lab)	Jeanette Prescott (Lab)
2021	Paul Prescott (Lab)	Eileen Rigby (Lab)	Jeanette Prescott (Lab)
2022	Paul Prescott (Lab)	Eileen Rigby (Lab)	Jeanette Prescott (Lab)
2023	Paul Prescott (Lab)	Eileen Rigby (Lab)	Jeanette Prescott (Lab)
2024	Paul Prescott (Lab)	Eileen Rigby (Lab)	Jeanette Prescott (Lab)
2026	Simon Silcock (Ref)	Eileen Rigby (Lab)	Jeanette Prescott (Lab)

indicates seat up for re-election. indicates seat won in by-election.
