= 2012 Wigan Metropolitan Borough Council election =

2012 UK local government election

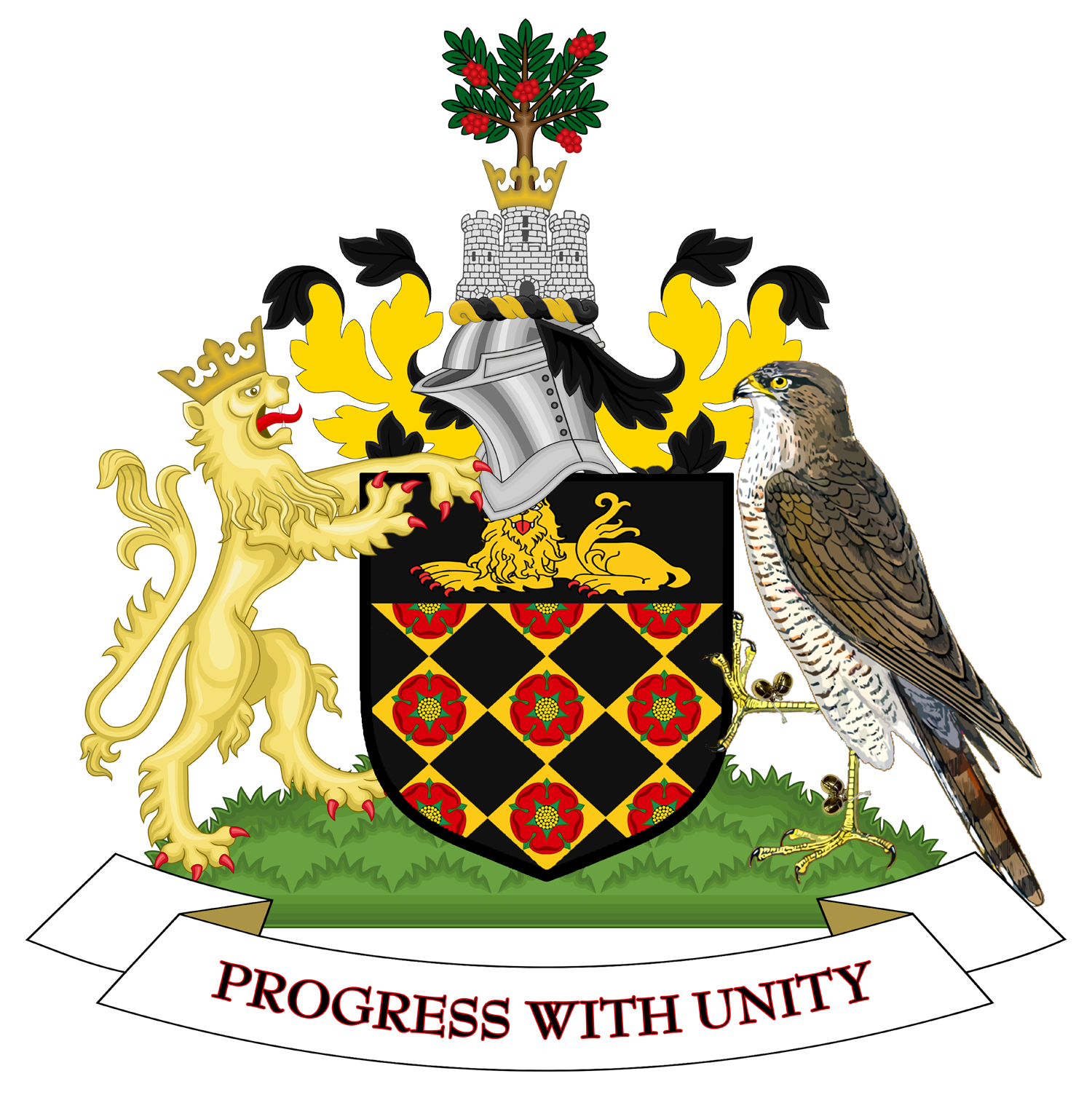
← 2011	3 May 2012	2014 →
Party	Labour	Conservative	Liberal Democrats
- 2012 local election results in Wigan. Conservative Labour Labour and Co-operative Liberal Democrats Independent Standish Independents

The 2012 Wigan Council elections to the Thirtieth Wigan Council were held on 3 May 2012, the same day as other local elections. One-third of the council was up for election.

As Wigan Metropolitan Borough Council is elected in thirds, change in vote share is compared with the corresponding 2008 elections and calculated on that basis.

== Overview ==
Number of Candidates fielded per party
Party	Number
Labour Party	25
Conservative Party	23
Independents	16
Community Action Party	7
BNP	5
Liberal Democrats	3
Green Party	2
UKIP	1
Green Socialists	1

== Ward results ==
=== Bolton West constituency ===
==== Atherton ward ====
Local Elections 2012: Atherton
Party	Candidate	Votes	%	±%
Independent	Jamie Hodgkinson	1695	51.3	
Labour	David Welch	1235	37.38	
Green Socialists For Investment Not Cuts	Stephen Michael Hall	190	5.75	
Conservative	Stephen Holt	179	5.42	
Rejected ballots		5	0.15	
Majority		460	13.92	
Turnout			29.23	

=== Makerfield constituency ===
==== Abram ward ====
Local Elections 2012: Abram
Party	Candidate	Votes	%	±%
Labour	Martyn Smethurst	1577	58.23	
Independent	Ken Winstanley	601	22.2	
BNP	Dennis Shambley	239	8.83	
Community Action	John Shale	148	5.5	
Conservative	Malcolm Childs	137	5.06	
Rejected ballots		6	0.22	
Majority		976	36.04	
Turnout		2708	24.87	

==== Ashton ward ====
Local Elections 2012: Ashton
Party	Candidate	Votes	%	±%
Labour	Bill Clarke	1400	51.89	
Independent	Paul Allan Tushingham	585	21.7	
Independent	Brian Merry	402	15	
Conservative	Marie Winstanley	189	7	
BNP	Barry John Longstaffe	118	4.37	
Rejected ballots		4	0.15	
Majority		815		
Turnout		2698	29.32	

==== Bryn ward ====
Local Elections 2012: Bryn
Party	Candidate	Votes	%	±%
Independent	Don Hodgkinson	1516	50.25	
Labour	Trevor Allen	1352	44.81	
Conservative	Stuart Peet	146	4.84	
Rejected ballots		3	0.1	
Majority		164	5.44	
Turnout		3017	32.55	

==== Hindley ward ====
Local Elections 2012: Hindley
Party	Candidate	Votes	%	±%
Independent	Jim Ellis	1279	46.24	
Labour	Allen Robert Jones	1232	44.54	
BNP	Stephen Bradbury	131	4.74	
Conservative	Steve Surples	115	4.16	
Rejected ballots		9	0.33	
Majority		47	1.7	
Turnout		2766	27.41	

==== Hindley Green ward ====
Local Elections 2012: Hindley Green
Party	Candidate	Votes	%	±%
Independent	Bob Brierley	1251	49.6	
Labour	Maxine Read	796	31.56	
Community Action	Barry Jack Fagan	354	14.04	
Conservative	Margaret Mary Winstanley	106	4.2	
Rejected ballots		15	0.6	
Majority		455	18.04	
Turnout		2522	29.51	

==== Orrell ward ====
Local Elections 2012: Orrell
Party	Candidate	Votes	%	±%
Labour	Kelly Ready	1533	47.71	
Conservative	Richard Clayton	1389	43.23	
Green	Donald McQueen	280	8.72	
Rejected ballots		11	0.34	
Majority		144	4.48	
Turnout		3213	34.34	

==== Winstanley ward ====
Local Elections 2012: Winstanley
Party	Candidate	Votes	%	±%
Labour	Paul Terence Kenny	1216	48.82	
Community Action	Stan Barnes	798	32.04	
Green	Steven Charles Heyes	237	9.51	
Conservative	Michael Nicholls	234	9.39	
Rejected ballots		6	0.24	
Majority		418	16.78	
Turnout		2491	27.82	

==== Worsley Mesnes ward ====
Local Elections 2012: Worsley Mesnes
Party	Candidate	Votes	%	±%
Labour	Phil Kelly	1960	85.47	
Conservative	David Ollerton	333	14.5	
Rejected ballots		17	0.74	
Majority		1627	71	
Turnout		2293	25.29	

=== Leigh constituency ===
==== Astley Mosley Common ward ====
Local Elections 2012: Astley Mosley Common
Party	Candidate	Votes	%	±%
Labour	Joanne Platt	1810	69.43	
Conservative	Nasri Barghothi	534	20.48	
Liberal Democrats	Kath Valentine	243	9.32	
Rejected ballots		20	0.77	
Majority		1276	48.95	
Turnout		2607	27.36	

==== Atherleigh ward ====
Local Elections 2012: Atherleigh
Party	Candidate	Votes	%	±%
Labour	Susan Loudon	982	47.23	
Independent	Stuart Andrew Gerrard	747	36	
Independent	Jim Kerfoot	343	16.5	
Rejected ballots		7	0.34	
Majority		235	11.3	
Turnout		2079	23.83	

==== Golborne and Lowton West ward ====
Local Elections 2012: Golborne and Lowton West
Party	Candidate	Votes	%	±%
Labour	Yvonne Marie Klieve	1791	70.6	
Community Action	Peter Franzen	507	20	
Conservative	Kathleen Houlton	241	9.5	
Rejected ballots		5	0.2	
Majority		1284	50.6	
Turnout		2538	28.05	

==== Leigh East ward ====
Local Elections 2012: Leigh East
Party	Candidate	Votes	%	±%
Labour	Keith Cunliffe	1452	67.63	
Independent	Christopher Garfin	411	19.14	
Conservative	Derek Davies	272	12.67	
Rejected ballots		12	0.56	
Majority		1041	48.5	
Turnout		2147	22.75	

==== Leigh South ward ====
Local Elections 2012: Leigh South
Party	Candidate	Votes	%	±%
Labour	Kevin Anderson	1811	63.3	
Conservative	Richard Short	534	18.66	
Independent	Gary Charles Chadwick	502	17.55	
Rejected ballots		14	0.5	
Majority		1277	44.63	
Turnout		2861	27.36	

==== Leigh West ward ====
Local Elections 2012: Leigh West
Party	Candidate	Votes	%	±%
Labour	Susan June Greensmith	1761	1761	
Independent	Brian Richard Turrell	650	24.81	
Conservative	Andrew John Oxley	195	7.44	
Rejected ballots		14	0.53	
Majority		1111	42.4	
Turnout		2620	23.62	

==== Lowton East ward ====
Local Elections 2012: Lowton East
Party	Candidate	Votes	%	±%
Conservative	James Grundy	1904	53.3	
Labour	Frank Bowker	1224	34.3	
Community Action	Ian (Sandy) Franzen	434	12.15	
Rejected ballots		10	0.28	
Majority		680	19	
Turnout		3572	36.53	

==== Tyldesley ward ====
Local Elections 2012: Tyldesley
Party	Candidate	Votes	%	±%
Liberal Democrats	Robert Mark Bleakley	1441	48.5	
Labour	Joanne Marshall	1303	43.84	
BNP	David Ian Peacock	206	6.93	
Rejected ballots		22	0.74	
Majority		138	4.64	
Turnout		2972	28.41	

=== Wigan constituency ===
==== Aspull, New Springs and Whelley ward ====
Local Elections 2012: Aspull, New Springs and Whelley
Party	Candidate	Votes	%	±%
Labour	John Hilton	2,241	69.38	
Conservative	Jane Surples	502	15.54	
Liberal Democrats	Alan Robinson	450	13.9	
Rejected ballots		37	1.15	
Majority		1739	53.84	
Turnout		3230	31.33	

==== Douglas ward ====
Local Elections 2012: Douglas
Party	Candidate	Votes	%	±%
Labour	Joy Birch	1,774	77.94	
Independent	Anthony Unsworth	324	14.24	
Conservative	Margaret Atherton	172	7.56	
Rejected ballots		6	0.26	
Majority		1450	63.71	
Turnout		2276	22.84	

==== Ince ward ====
Local Elections 2012: Ince
Party	Candidate	Votes	%	±%
Labour	David Trevor Molyneux	1,790	80.2	
BNP	Henry Morgan	309	13.84	
Conservative	Ray Whittingham	120	5.38	
Rejected ballots		13	0.58	
Majority		1481	66.35	
Turnout		2232	24.25	

==== Pemberton ward ====
Local Elections 2012: Pemberton
Party	Candidate	Votes	%	±%
Labour	Jeanette Prescott	1,996	79.90	
Community Action	Mike Leyland	291	11.65	
Conservative	Jonathan Charles Cartwright	205	8.21	
Rejected ballots		6	0.24	
Majority		1705	68.25	
Turnout		2498	25.01	

==== Shevington with Lower Ground ward ====
Local Elections 2012: Shevington with Lower Ground
Party	Candidate	Votes	%	±%
Labour	Damian Edwardson	1362	49.1	
Conservative	Callum Chadwick	532	19.18	
UKIP	Arnold Jefferson Foster	450	16.22	
Shevington Independents	Debbie Fairhurst	220	7.93	
Independent	Paul Liptrot	198	7.14	
Rejected ballots		12	0.43	
Majority		830	29.92	
Turnout		2774	29.69	

==== Standish with Langtree ward ====
Local Elections 2012: Standish with Langtree
Party	Candidate	Votes	%	±%
Standish Independents	Gareth William Fairhurst	2069	57.73	
Labour	Sam Murphy	913	25.47	
Conservative	Michael William Winstanley	589	16.4	
Rejected ballots		13	0.36	
Majority		1156	32.25	
Turnout		3584	36.55	

==== Wigan Central ward ====
Local Elections 2012: Wigan Central
Party	Candidate	Votes	%	±%
Labour	Lol Hunt	1,806	58.8	
Conservative	Jean Peet	859	28	
Community Action	Syd Hall	388	12.63	
Rejected ballots		19	0.62	
Majority		947	30.83	
Turnout		3072	32.49	

==== Wigan West ward ====
Local Elections 2012: Wigan West
Party	Candidate	Votes	%	±%
Labour	Terence William Halliwell	2,115	83	
Conservative	Oliver Barton	409	16	
Rejected ballots		27	1	
Majority		1709	67	
Turnout		2551	25.28	
