= Aspull, New Springs and Whelley =

- Electoral ward
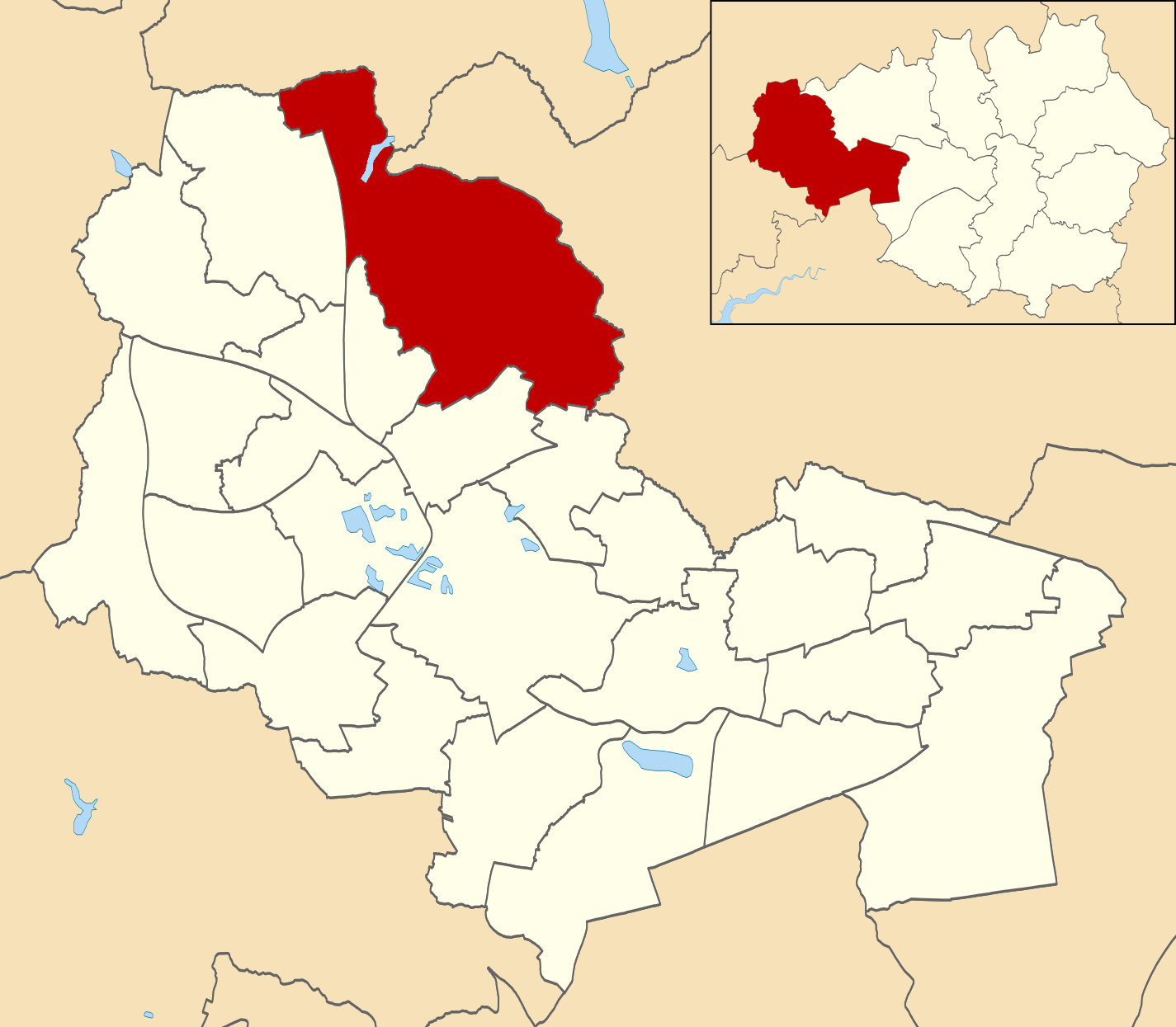
- Aspull, New Springs and Whelley ward within Wigan Metropolitan Borough Council

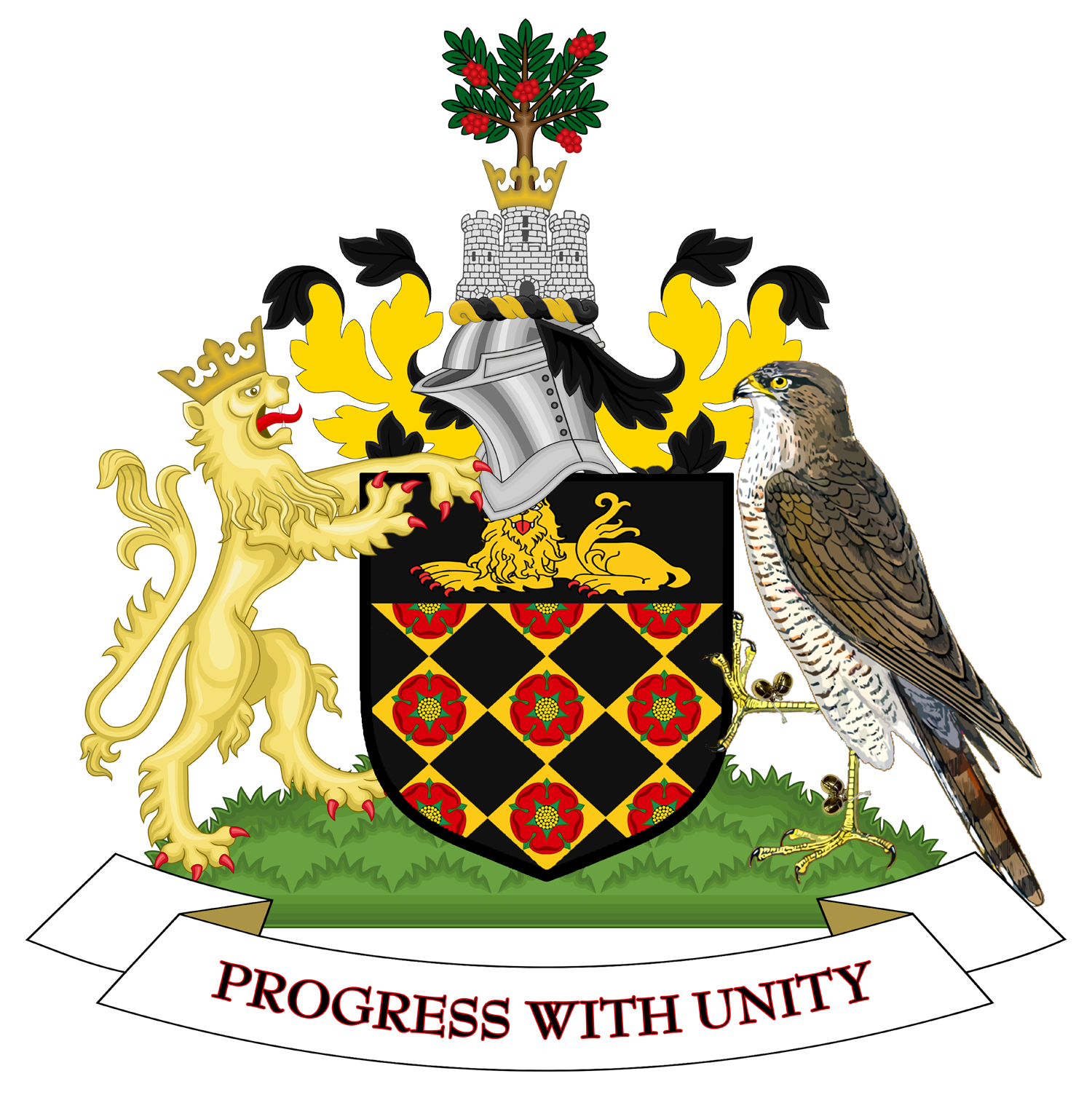
- Coat of arms
- Motto: Progress with Unity
- Country: United Kingdom
- Constituent country: England
- Region: North West England
- County: Greater Manchester
- Metropolitan borough: Wigan
- Created: May 2004
- Named after: Aspull and Whelley

Government
  - Type: Unicameral
  - Body: Wigan Metropolitan Borough Council
  - Mayor of Wigan: Debbie Parkinson (Labour)
  - Councillor: Ronald Conway (Labour)
  - Councillor: Laura Flynn (Labour)
  - Councillor: Christopher Ready (Labour)

Population
  - Total: 12,760

Aspull, New Springs and Whelley is an electoral ward in Wigan, England. It forms part of Wigan Metropolitan Borough Council, as well as the parliamentary constituency of Wigan.

== Councillors ==
The ward is represented by three councillors: Ronald Conway (Lab), Laura Flynn (Lab), and Christopher Ready (Lab).

Election	Councillor	Councillor	Councillor
2004	J. Beswick (Lib Dem)	Christopher Ready (Lab)	John Hilton (Lab)
2006	J. Beswick (Lib Dem)	Christopher Ready (Lab)	John Hilton (Lab)
2007	J. Beswick (Lib Dem)	Christopher Ready (Lab)	John Hilton (Lab)
2008	J. Beswick (Lib Dem)	Christopher Ready (Lab)	John Hilton (Lab)
2010	Ronald Conway (Lab)	Christopher Ready (Lab)	John Hilton (Lab)
2011	Ronald Conway (Lab)	Christopher Ready (Lab)	John Hilton (Lab)
2012	Ronald Conway (Lab)	Christopher Ready (Lab)	John Hilton (Lab)
2014	Ronald Conway (Lab)	Christopher Ready (Lab)	John Hilton (Lab)
2015	Ronald Conway (Lab)	Christopher Ready (Lab)	John Hilton (Lab)
2016	Ronald Conway (Lab)	Christopher Ready (Lab)	John Hilton (Lab)
2018	Ronald Conway (Lab)	Christopher Ready (Lab)	John Hilton (Lab)
2019	Ronald Conway (Lab)	Christopher Ready (Lab)	John Hilton (Lab)
2021	Ronald Conway (Lab)	Christopher Ready (Lab)	Laura Flynn (Lab)
2022	Ronald Conway (Lab)	Christopher Ready (Lab)	Laura Flynn (Lab)
2023	Ronald Conway (Lab)	Christopher Ready (Lab)	Laura Flynn (Lab)
2024	Ronald Conway (Lab)	Christopher Ready (Lab)	Laura Flynn (Lab)

indicates seat up for re-election.
