= 2022 Wigan Metropolitan Borough Council election =

2022 local election in England

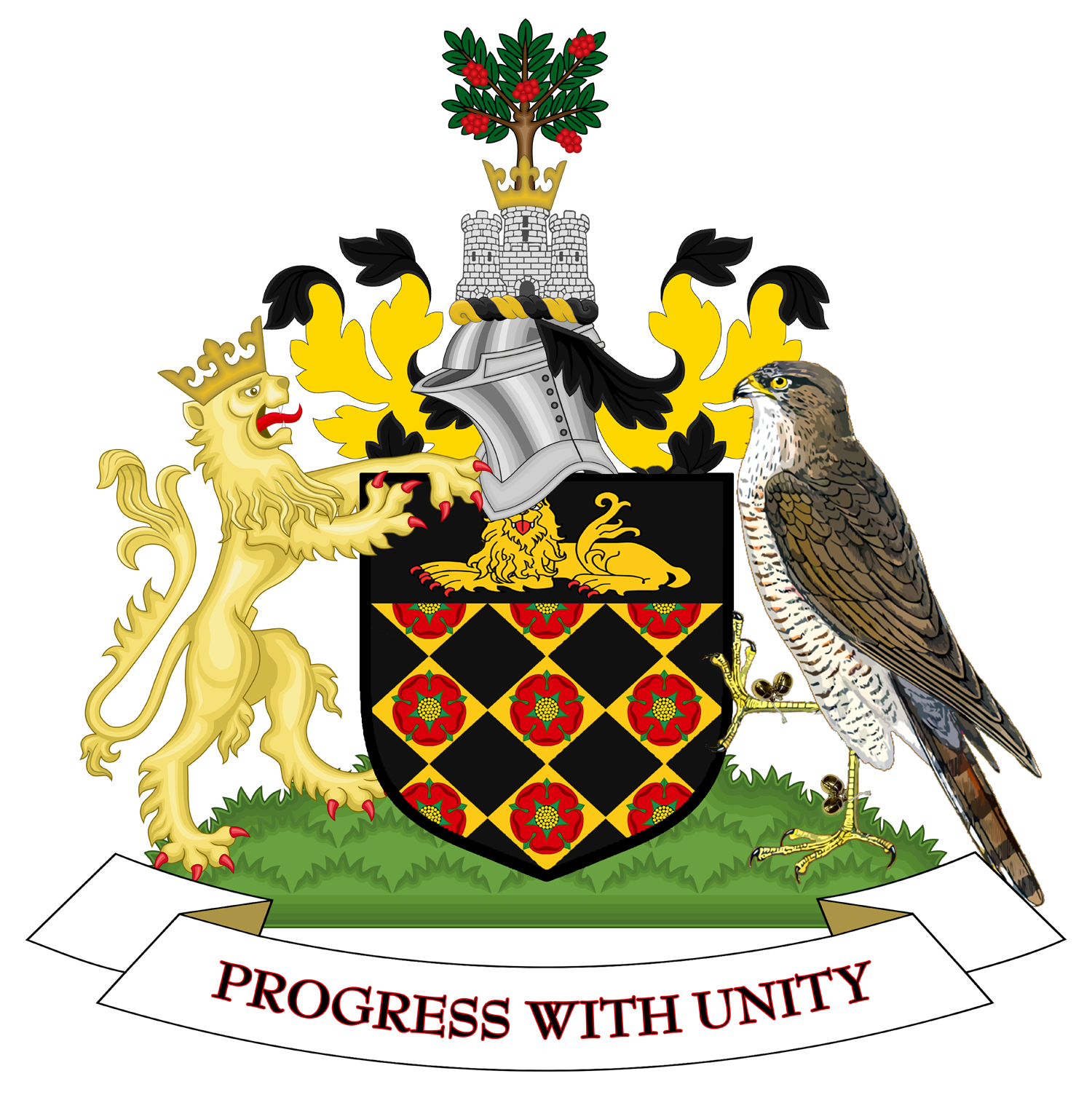
- 5 May 2022

26 of 75 seats to Wigan Metropolitan Borough Council 38 seats needed for a majority
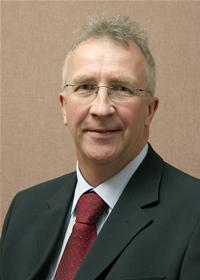

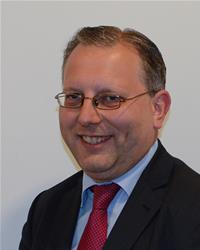
	First party	Second party
Leader	David Molyneux	Michael Winstanley
Party	Labour	Conservative
Leader since	15 May 2018	11 May 2016
Leader's seat	Ince	Orrell (defeated)
Seats before	57	8
Seats after	61	7
Seat change	▲4	▼1
- 2022 local election results in Wigan. Labour Conservative Labour and Co-op Independent Independent Network

The 2022 Wigan Metropolitan Borough Council election took place on 5 May 2022 to elect members of Wigan Metropolitan Borough Council in England. This election was held on the same day as other local elections. A by-election was held on the same day in Leigh East ward to fill the seat left vacant by the death of Labour councillor Anita Thorpe.

== Overview ==
After 2021 election		Before 2022 election		After 2022 election	
Party	Seats	Party	Seats	Party	Seats
Labour	57	Labour	57	Labour	61
Conservative	8	Conservative	8	Conservative	7
Independent	10	Independent	8	Independent	7
		Vacant	2		

Number of Candidates fielded per party
Party	Number of Candidates
Labour Party	26
Conservative Party	26
Liberal Democrats	16
Independents	9
Leigh and Atherton Independents	4
Standish Independents	1
UKIP	1
Wigan Independents	1

== Results summary ==
2022 Wigan Metropolitan Borough Council election
Party	This election				Full council			This election		
Party	Candidates	Seats	Net	Seats %	Other	Total	Total %	Votes	Votes %	+/−
Labour	{{{candidates}}}	22	▲3	84.6	39	61	81.3	35,544	53.0	▲0.7
Conservative	{{{candidates}}}	2	▼1	7.7	5	7	9.3	17,635	26.3	▲2.2
Independent	{{{candidates}}}	2	▼2	7.7	5	7	9.3	7,259	10.8	▼2.8
Liberal Democrats	{{{candidates}}}	0	Steady	0.0	0	0	0.0	3,631	5.4	▲1.6
Leigh and Atherton Independents	{{{candidates}}}	0	Steady	0.0	0	0	0.0	1,270	1.9	New
Wigan Independents	{{{candidates}}}	0	Steady	0.0	0	0	0.0	783	1.2	▼2.2
Standish Independents	{{{candidates}}}	0	Steady	0.0	0	0	0.0	686	1.0	New
UKIP	{{{candidates}}}	0	Steady	0.0	0	0	0.0	231	0.3	▼1.6

== Ward results ==
=== Bolton West constituency ===
==== Atherton ward ====
Local Elections 2022: Atherton
Party	Candidate	Votes	%	±%
Ind. Network	Stuart Andrew Gerrard	1,518	51.4	▼2.3
Labour	Julie Ann Hilling	855	29.0	▼7.2
Atherton Independent	Quinton John Smith	306	10.4	New
Conservative	Paul Lambert Fairhurst	274	9.3	▼0.8
Majority		663	22.4	▲4.9
Turnout		2,953	26.3	▼4.4
Independent hold		Swing		

=== Leigh constituency ===
==== Astley Mosley Common ward ====
Local Elections 2022: Astley Mosley Common
Party	Candidate	Votes	%	±%
Labour	Barry John Taylor	1,368	40.8	▼11.9
Independent	Andy Brown	1,122	33.4	New
Conservative	David John Stirzaker	867	25.8	▼16.4
Majority		246	7.4	▼3.1
Turnout		3,357	32.3	▲5.1
Labour hold		Swing		

==== Atherleigh ward ====
Local Elections 2022: Atherleigh
Party	Candidate	Votes	%	±%
Labour	Debra Susan Ann Wailes	1,099	51.6	▲3.5
Conservative	Angle Anne Roberts	469	22.0	▲1.8
Independent	Natasha Louise Hodgkinson	433	20.3	New
Leigh & Atherton Independents	Zoë Irlam	127	6.0	New
Majority		630	29.6	▲9.7
Turnout		2,128	25.2	▲1.8
Labour hold		Swing		

==== Golborne and Lowton West ward ====
Local Elections 2022: Golborne and Lowton West
Party	Candidate	Votes	%	±%
Labour	Susan Gambles	1,488	63.0	▲5.8
Conservative	James Falle Geddes	695	29.4	▲14.0
Liberal Democrats	Andrew Julian Lee Holland	180	7.6	New
Majority		793	33.6	▲3.8
Turnout		2,363	28.3	▲3.0
Labour hold		Swing		

==== Leigh East ward ====
Local Elections 2022: Leigh East (2 seats)
Party	Candidate	Votes	%	±%
Labour	Shelley Guest	1,418	46.8	▼12.8
Labour	Fred Walker	1,123	37.1	▼12.5
Conservative	Trevor Halliwell Barton	734	24.2	▼1.8
Conservative	Stephen Richard Gunby	495	16.3	▼9.7
Leigh East Independent	James Edward Morley	435	14.4	New
Liberal Democrats	Simon Paul Brooks	215	7.1	▼7.3
Majority		684	22.6	
Turnout		3,031	25.7	
Labour hold		Swing		
Labour hold		Swing		

==== Leigh South ward ====
Local Elections 2022: Leigh South
Party	Candidate	Votes	%	±%
Labour	Charles Rigby	1,561	51.5	▼2.9
Conservative	Joshua James Yates	1,143	37.7	▼7.9
Liberal Democrats	Christopher John Noon	327	10.8	New
Majority		418	13.8	▲5.0
Turnout		3,031	29.3	▲1.8
Labour hold		Swing		

==== Leigh West ward ====
Local Elections 2022: Leigh West
Party	Candidate	Votes	%	±%
Labour	Samantha Clare Brown	1,566	61.5	▲7.4
Conservative	Tracey Marie Mcclelland	505	19.8	▲4.3
Leigh West Independent	Jayson Allan Hargreaves	402	15.8	New
Liberal Democrats	Sharron-Lee Honey	73	2.9	▼3.6
Majority		1,061	41.7	▲11.5
Turnout		2,546	22.7	▼0.4
Labour hold		Swing		

==== Lowton East ward ====
Local Elections 2022: Lowton East
Party	Candidate	Votes	%	±%
Conservative	Edward Noel Houlton	1,995	53.0	▼7.9
Labour	Gary Peter Lloyd	1,770	47.0	▲7.9
Majority		225	6.0	▼15.8
Turnout		3,765	35.2	▼0.9
Conservative hold		Swing		

==== Tyldesley ward ====
Local Elections 2022: Tyldesley
Party	Candidate	Votes	%	±%
Labour	Joanne Marshall	1,755	66.4	▲15.4
Conservative	Gerard Joseph Houlton	890	33.6	▲11.3
Majority		865	32.8	▲8.6
Turnout		2,645	25.9	▲0.4
Labour hold		Swing		

=== Makerfield constituency ===
==== Abram ward ====
Local Elections 2022: Abram
Party	Candidate	Votes	%	±%
Labour	Carl Sweeney	1,240	50.4	▼18.3
Independent	David William Bowker	812	33.0	New
Conservative	Stanley Crook	290	11.8	▼7.0
Liberal Democrats	Graham Trevor Suddick	120	4.9	New
Majority		428	17.4	▼32.5
Turnout		2,462	22.6	▲1.9
Labour hold		Swing		

==== Ashton ward ====
Local Elections 2022: Ashton
Party	Candidate	Votes	%	±%
Labour	Anthony John Sykes	1,281	53.4	▲0.2
Conservative	Paul Martin	557	23.2	▲21.5
Independent	James Alan Richardson	470	19.6	New
Liberal Democrats	Geoffrey Stephen Matthews	92	3.8	▲1.8
Majority		724	30.2	▲14.9
Turnout		2,400	27.1	▲3.6
Labour hold		Swing		

==== Bryn ward ====
Local Elections 2022: Bryn
Party	Candidate	Votes	%	±%
Independent	Steve Jones	1,772	66.9	New
Labour	David Josiah Aitchison	691	26.1	▼13.8
Conservative	Sandip Navnit Tailor	128	4.8	▼3.3
Liberal Democrats	Stuart David Thomas	58	2.2	▼0.6
Majority		1,081	40.8	N/A
Turnout		2,649	30.0	▲2.4
Independent gain from Independent		Swing		

==== Hindley ward ====
Local Elections 2022: Hindley
Party	Candidate	Votes	%	±%
Labour	Jim Talbot	1,304	58.7	▲12.8
Conservative	Marie Winstanley	397	17.9	▲9.0
Liberal Democrats	John Charles Skipworth	288	13.0	▲10.5
UKIP	Jordan James Gaskell	231	10.4	New
Majority		907	40.8	▲33.9
Turnout		2,220	23.3	▼0.8
Labour hold		Swing		

==== Hindley Green ward ====
Local Elections 2022: Hindley Green
Party	Candidate	Votes	%	±%
Labour	James Thomas Palmer	1,252	54.8	▲21.4
Conservative	Susan Atherton	461	20.2	▲8.0
Independent	Deborah Lloyd	381	16.7	New
Liberal Democrats	Gary John Skipworth	191	8.4	▼4.6
Majority		791	34.6	N/A
Turnout		2,285	25.9	▼1.5
Labour gain from Independent		Swing		

==== Orrell ward ====
Local Elections 2022: Orrell
Party	Candidate	Votes	%	±%
Labour Co-op	Dave Wood	1,387	45.4	▲3.9
Conservative	Michael William Winstanley	1,353	44.3	▼2.3
Liberal Democrats	Neil Duncan Stevenson	313	10.3	▼1.7
Majority		34	1.1	N/A
Turnout		3,053	32.6	▲0.4
Labour Co-op gain from Conservative		Swing		

==== Winstanley ward ====
Local Elections 2022: Winstanley
Party	Candidate	Votes	%	±%
Labour	Clive William Morgan	1,428	59.6	▲1.2
Conservative	Margaret Mary Winstanley	641	26.8	▲5.5
Liberal Democrats	Robert Duncan Stevenson	327	13.6	▲8.8
Majority		787	32.8	▼4.3
Turnout		2,396	26.6	▲0.4
Labour hold		Swing		

==== Worsley Mesnes ward ====
Local Elections 2022: Worsley Mesnes
Party	Candidate	Votes	%	±%
Labour	Patricia Lynne Holland	1,363	60.0	▼6.5
Independent	Danny Cooke	396	17.4	New
Conservative	Michael Colin Owens	391	17.2	▲2.8
Liberal Democrats	Donald John Macnamara	122	5.4	▲1.3
Majority		967	42.6	▼8.9
Turnout		2,272	25.5	▲1.4
Labour hold		Swing		

=== Wigan constituency ===
==== Aspull, New Springs and Whelley ward ====
Local Elections 2022: Aspull, New Springs and Whelley
Party	Candidate	Votes	%	±%
Labour	Ron Conway	2,025	71.7	▲10.3
Conservative	Paul John Chapman	798	28.3	▲0.8
Majority		1,227	43.4	▲9.5
Turnout		2,823	28.6	▲0.4
Labour hold		Swing		

==== Douglas ward ====
Local Elections 2022: Douglas
Party	Candidate	Votes	%	±%
Labour	Mary Gwendoline Callaghan	1,457	75.2	▼3.4
Conservative	Michael Stephen Riley	480	24.8	▲3.4
Majority		977	50.4	▼6.8
Turnout		1,937	20.5	▼0.3
Labour hold		Swing		

==== Ince ward ====
Local Elections 2022: Ince
Party	Candidate	Votes	%	±%
Labour	James Moodie	1,143	68.8	▼0.4
Conservative	Allan Atherton	518	31.2	▲21.0
Majority		625	37.6	▼11.0
Turnout		1,661	18.7	▼2.0
Labour hold		Swing		

==== Pemberton ward ====
Local Elections 2022: Pemberton
Party	Candidate	Votes	%	±%
Labour	Paul Prescott	1,187	60.0	▼14.4
Independent	Tony Porter	355	17.9	New
Conservative	Jean Margaret Peet	311	15.7	▼0.6
Liberal Democrats	David John Burley	125	6.3	▼3.0
Majority		832	42.1	▼16.0
Turnout		1,978	20.6	Steady
Labour hold		Swing		

==== Shevington with Lower Ground ward ====
Local Elections 2022: Shevington with Lower Ground
Party	Candidate	Votes	%	±%
Labour	Vicky Galligan	1,307	43.6	▲5.7
Shevington Independents Part Wigan Independents	Gareth William Fairhurst	783	26.1	▼14.0
Conservative	Gary Robinson	566	18.9	▲1.2
Liberal Democrats	Brian Craig Duff Crombie-Fisher	339	11.3	New
Majority		524	17.5	N/A
Turnout		2,995	32.9	▲3.3
Labour gain from Independent		Swing		

==== Standish with Langtree ward ====
Local Elections 2022: Standish with Langtree
Party	Candidate	Votes	%	±%
Conservative	Judith Atherton	1,382	40.5	▲3.7
Labour	Terry Mugan	1,346	39.4	▲3.0
Standish Independents	Debbie Fairhurst	686	20.1	▼6.7
Majority		36	1.1	▲0.7
Turnout		3,414	31.0	▼2.3
Conservative hold		Swing		

The "Standish Independents" description was used at the last election by the same candidate, but standing for the Wigan Independents, a separate political party.

==== Wigan Central ward ====
Local Elections 2022: Wigan Central
Party	Candidate	Votes	%	±%
Labour	George Davies	1,588	56.3	▲0.8
Conservative	Cyril Pendlebury	853	30.3	▼0.2
Liberal Democrats	Caroline Waddicor	378	13.4	▲7.4
Majority		735	26.0	▲1.0
Turnout		2,819	30.4	▲0.9
Labour hold		Swing		

==== Wigan West ward ====
Local Elections 2022: Wigan West
Party	Candidate	Votes	%	±%
Labour	Phyll Cullen	1,542	62.5	▼9.5
Liberal Democrats	Ian Dyer	483	19.6	New
Conservative	Margaret Atherton	442	17.9	▲2.9
Majority		1,059	44.6	▼12.4
Turnout		2,467	27.5	▲2.1
Labour hold		Swing		

== By-elections between 2022 and 2023 ==
=== Ashton ward ===
Ashton, 15 December 2022
Party	Candidate	Votes	%	±%
Labour	Andrew John Bullen	294	62.8	▲9.4
Conservative	Paul Martin	146	31.2	▲8.0
Liberal Democrats	Geoffrey Stephen Matthews	28	6.0	▲2.2
Majority		148	31.6	▲1.4
Turnout		468	5.3	▼21.8
Labour hold		Swing		
