= Ince and Scholes =

Ince
- Electoral ward
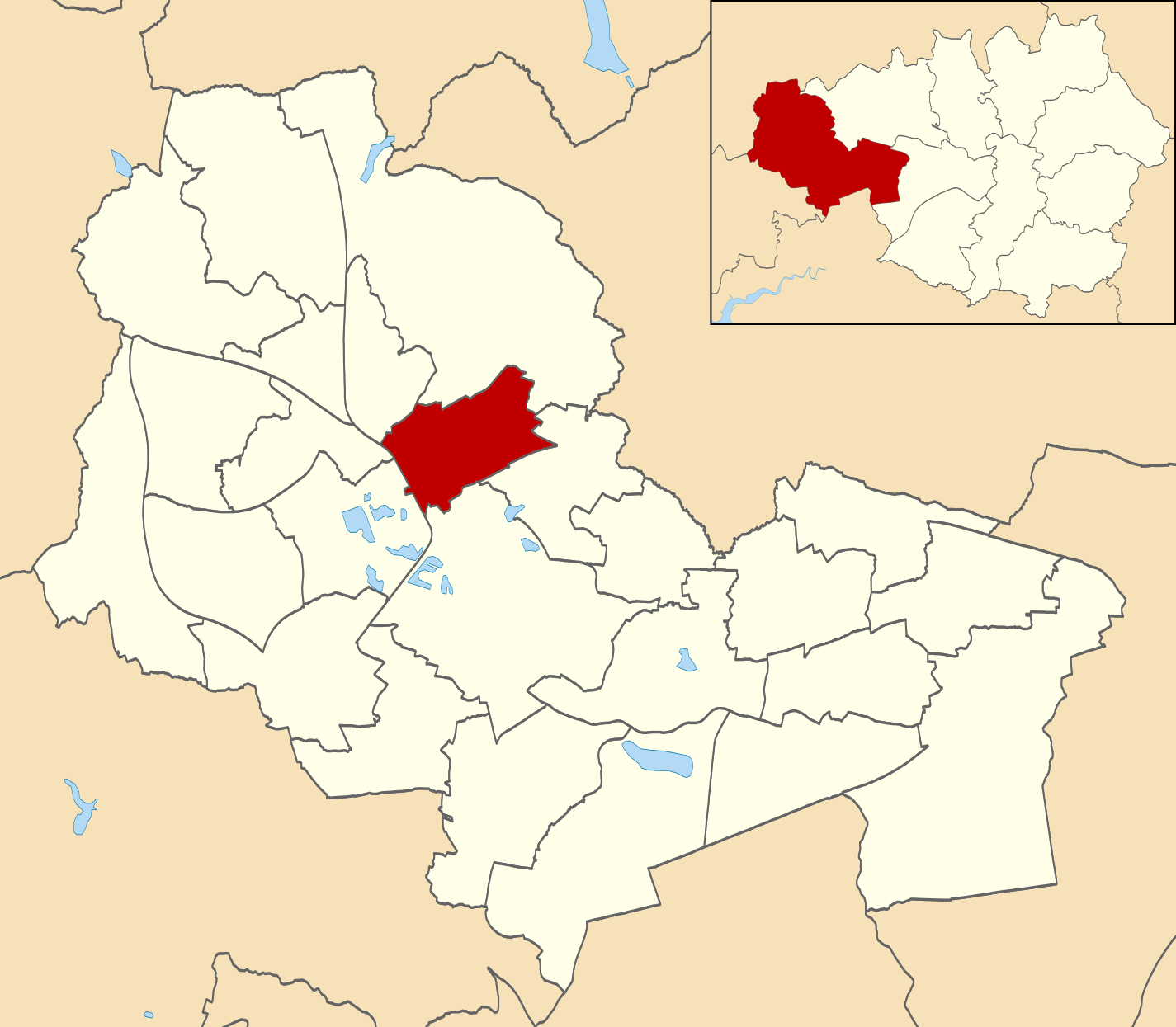
- Ince ward within Wigan Metropolitan Borough Council

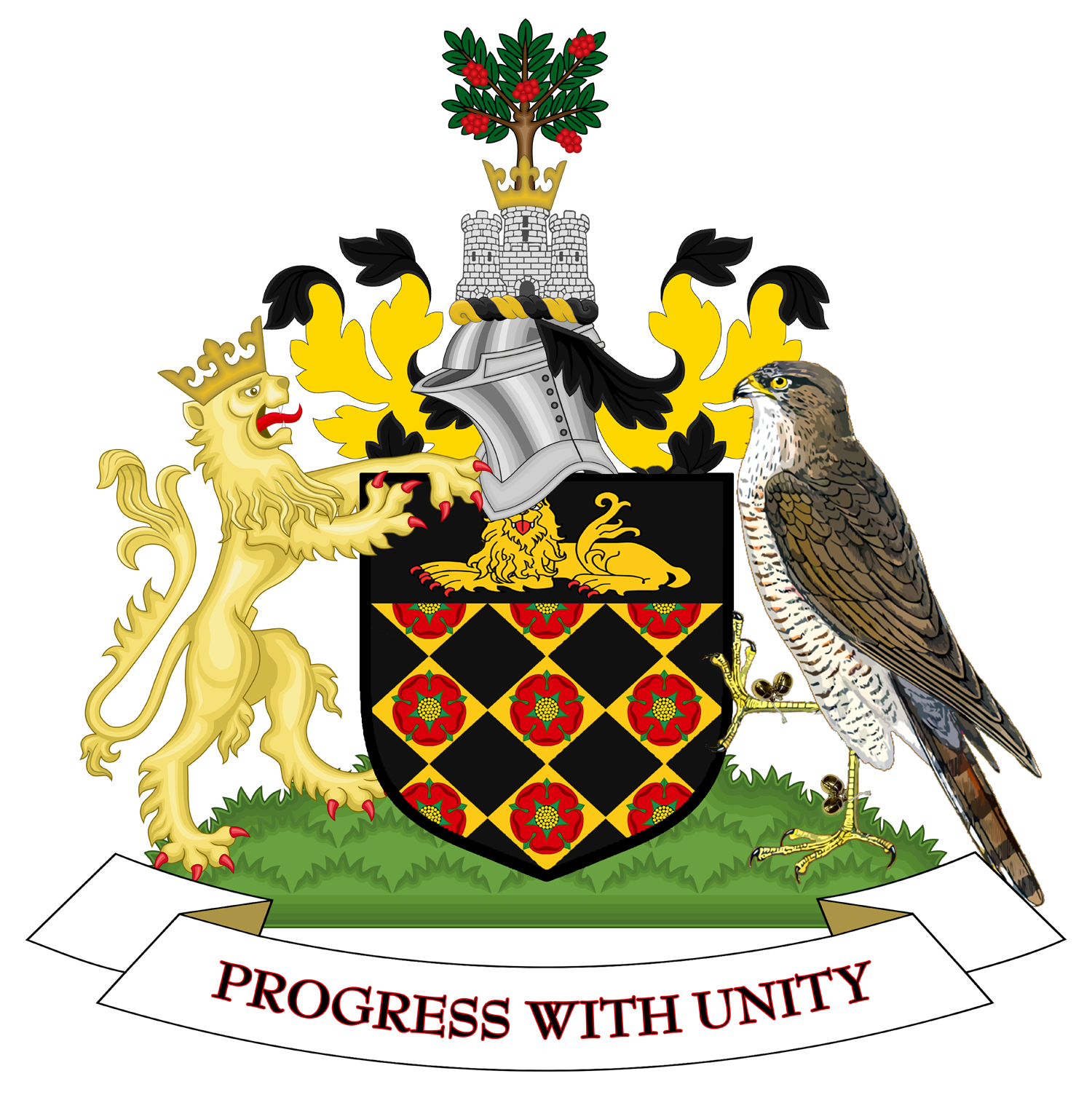
- Coat of arms
- Motto: Progress with Unity
- Country: United Kingdom
- Constituent country: England
- Region: North West England
- County: Greater Manchester
- Metropolitan borough: Wigan
- Created: May 1980
- Named after: Ince-in-Makerfield

Government
  - Type: Unicameral
  - Body: Wigan Metropolitan Borough Council
  - Mayor of Wigan: Debbie Parkinson (Labour)
  - Councillor: David Molyneux (Labour)
  - Councillor: Maureen O'Bern (Independent)
  - Councillor: Tony Whyte (Independent)

Population
  - Total: 13,961

Ince is an electoral ward in Wigan Metropolitan Borough, England. It forms part of Wigan Metropolitan Borough Council, as well as the parliamentary constituency of Wigan.

== Councillors ==
The ward is represented by three councillors; David Molyneux (Lab), Maureen O'Bern (Ind), and Tony Whyte (Ind)

Election	Councillor	Councillor	Councillor
2004	James Moodie (Lab)	J. Hurst (Lab)	David Molyneux (Lab)
2006	James Moodie (Lab)	J. Hurst (Lab)	David Molyneux (Lab)
2007	James Moodie (Lab)	J. Hurst (Lab)	David Molyneux (Lab)
2008	James Moodie (Lab)	J. Hurst (Lab)	David Molyneux (Lab)
2010	James Moodie (Lab)	J. Hurst (Lab)	David Molyneux (Lab)
2011	James Moodie (Lab)	Janice Sharratt (Lab)	David Molyneux (Lab)
2012	James Moodie (Lab)	Janice Sharratt (Lab)	David Molyneux (Lab)
2014	James Moodie (Lab)	Janice Sharratt (Lab)	David Molyneux (Lab)
2015	James Moodie (Lab)	Janice Sharratt (Lab)	David Molyneux (Lab)
2016	James Moodie (Lab)	Janice Sharratt (Lab)	David Molyneux (Lab)
2018	James Moodie (Lab)	Janice Sharratt (Lab)	David Molyneux (Lab)
2019	James Moodie (Lab)	Janice Sharratt (Lab)	David Molyneux (Lab)
2021	James Moodie (Lab)	Janice Sharratt (Lab)	David Molyneux (Lab)
2022	James Moodie (Lab)	Janice Sharratt (Lab)	David Molyneux (Lab)
2023	Maureen O'Bern (Ind)	Janice Sharratt (Lab)	David Molyneux (Lab)
2024	Maureen O'Bern (Ind)	Tony Whyte (Ind)	David Molyneux (Lab)

indicates seat up for re-election.
