= Douglas (ward) =

- Electoral ward
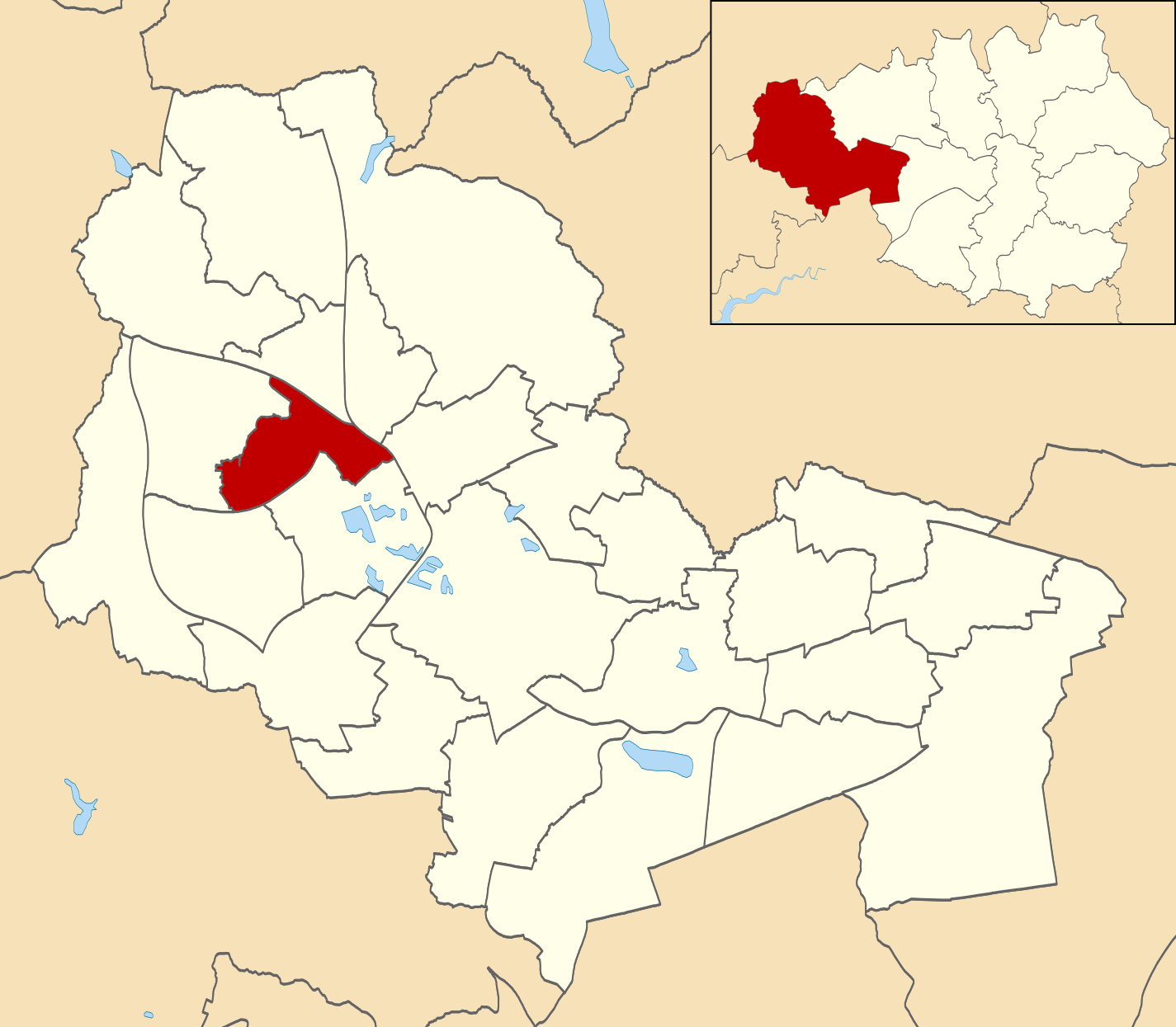
- Douglas ward within Wigan Metropolitan Borough Council

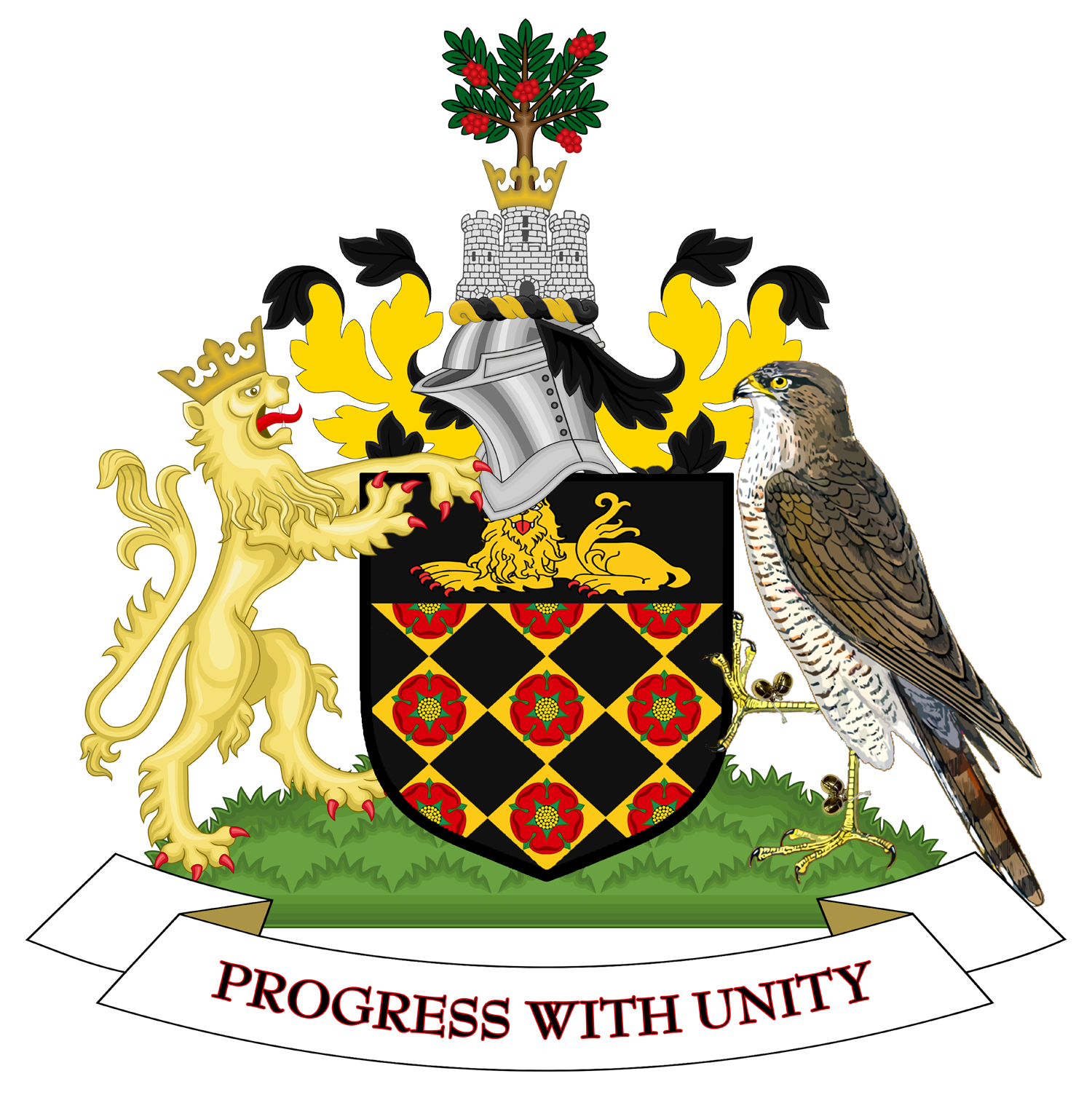
- Coat of arms
- Motto: Progress with Unity
- Country: United Kingdom
- Constituent country: England
- Region: North West England
- County: Greater Manchester
- Metropolitan borough: Wigan
- Created: May 2004

Government
  - Type: Unicameral
  - Body: Wigan Metropolitan Borough Council
  - Mayor of Wigan: Anne collins (Labour)
  - Councillor: Mary Gwendoline Callaghan (Labour)
  - Councillor: Pat Draper (Labour)
  - Councillor: Matt Dawber (Labour)

Population
  - Total: 13,403

Douglas is an electoral ward in Wigan, England. It forms part of Wigan Metropolitan Borough Council, as well as the parliamentary constituency of Wigan.

== Councillors ==
The ward is represented by three councillors: Councillor Mary Gwendoline Callaghan (Lab), Councillor Matt Dawber (Lab), and Councillor Pat Draper (Lab).

Election	Councillor	Councillor	Councillor
2004	M. Coughlin (Lab)	C. Hitchen (Lab)	Joy Birch (Lab)
By-election, 16 June 2005	Shirley Dewhurst (Lab)	Michael Dewhurst (Lab)	Joy Birch (Lab)
2006	Shirley Dewhurst (Lab)	Michael Dewhurst (Lab)	Joy Birch (Lab)
2007	Shirley Dewhurst (Lab)	Michael Dewhurst (Lab)	Joy Birch (Lab)
2008	Shirley Dewhurst (Lab)	Michael Dewhurst (Lab)	Joy Birch (Lab)
2010	Shirley Dewhurst (Lab)	Michael Dewhurst (Lab)	Joy Birch (Lab)
2011	Shirley Dewhurst (Lab)	Michael Dewhurst (Lab)	Joy Birch (Lab)
2012	Shirley Dewhurst (Lab)	Michael Dewhurst (Lab)	Joy Birch (Lab)
2014	Shirley Dewhurst (Lab)	Michael Dewhurst (Lab)	Joy Birch (Lab)
By-election, 13 November 2014	Shirley Dewhurst (Lab)	Michael Dewhurst (Lab)	Maggie Skilling (Lab)
2015	Shirley Dewhurst (Lab)	Michael Dewhurst (Lab)	Maggie Skilling (Lab)
2016	Shirley Dewhurst (Lab)	Michael Dewhurst (Lab)	Pat Draper (Lab)
2018	Shirley Dewhurst (Lab)	Michael Dewhurst (Lab)	Pat Draper (Lab)
2019	Shirley Dewhurst (Lab)	Sheila Ramsdale (Lab)	Pat Draper (Lab)
2021	Shirley Dewhurst (Lab)	Sheila Ramsdale (Lab)	Pat Draper (Lab)
2022	Mary Gwendoline Callaghan (Lab)	Sheila Ramsdale (Lab)	Pat Draper (Lab)
2023	Mary Gwendoline Callaghan (Lab)	Matt Dawber (Lab)	Pat Draper (Lab)
2024	Mary Gwendoline Callaghan (Lab)	Matt Dawber (Lab)	Pat Draper (Lab)

indicates seat up for re-election. indicates seat won in by-election.
