= 2014 Wigan Metropolitan Borough Council election =

2014 UK local government election

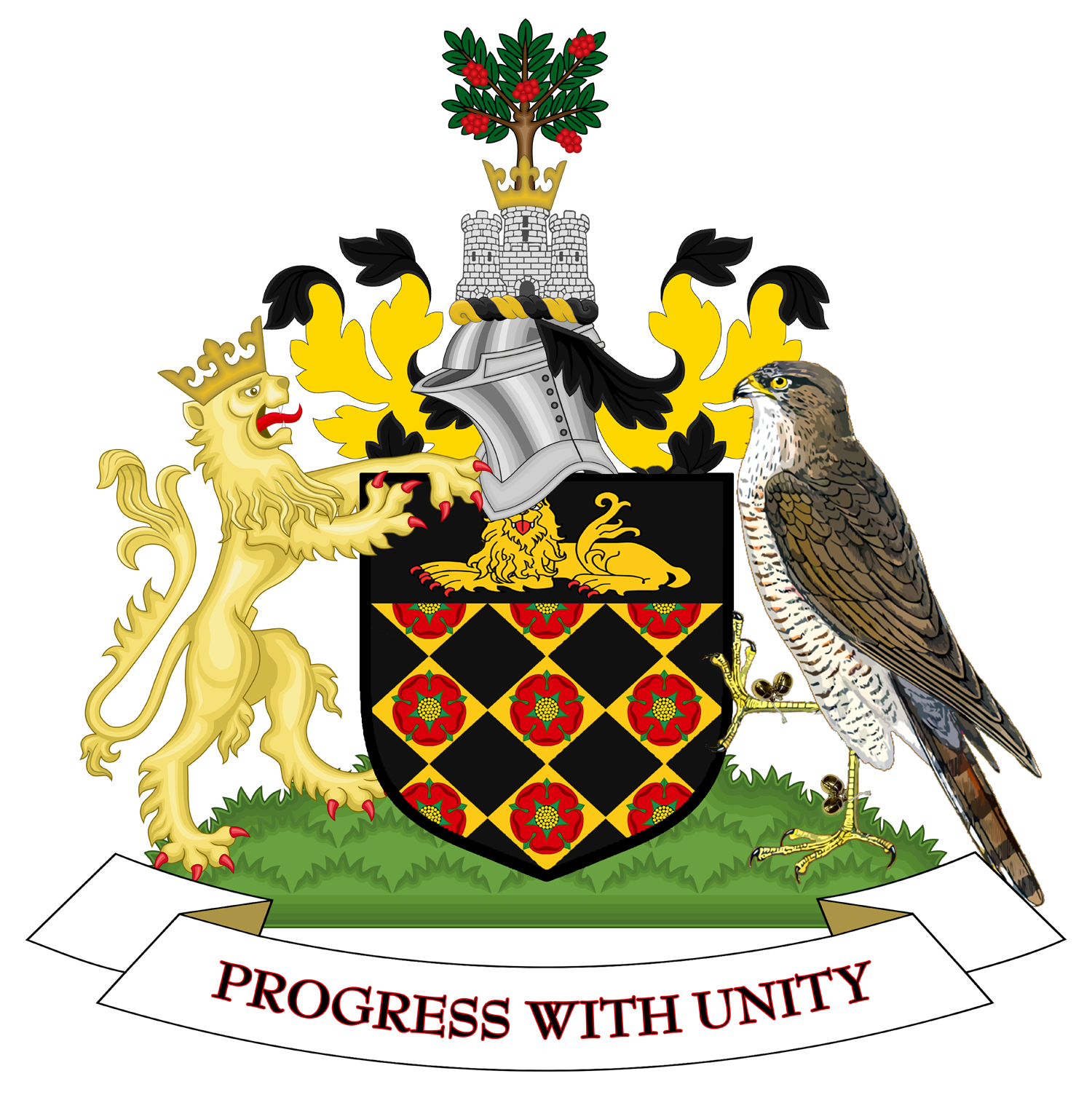
← 2012	22 May 2014	2015 →
Party	Labour	Conservative
- 2014 local election results in Wigan. Conservative Labour Labour and Co-operative Independent

The 2014 Wigan Metropolitan Borough Council election took place on 22 May 2014 to elect members of Wigan Metropolitan Borough Council in England. This was on the same day as other local elections.

== Overview ==
Number of Candidates fielded per party
Party	Number of Candidates
Labour Party	25
Conservative Party	25
UKIP	15
Community Action Party	7
Left Unity	7
Independents	7
Green	3
Liberal Democrats	2
Wigan Independents	2
BNP	1
TUSC	1
Wigan Real Labour	1

== Results summary ==
2014 Wigan Metropolitan Borough Council election
Party	This election			Full council			This election		
Party	Seats	Net	Seats %	Other	Total	Total %	Votes	Votes %	+/−
Labour	23	▼1	92	39	62	82.7	36,065	51.1	
Conservative	1	▲1	4	1	2	2.7	11,722	16.6	
Wigan Independents	1	▲1	4	2	3	4	2,340	3.3	
Independent	0	Steady	0	8	8	10.7	5,252	7.4	
UKIP	0	Steady	0	0	0	0	11,327	16.0	
Community Action	0	Steady	0	0	0	0	1,590	2.3	
Left Unity	0	Steady	0	0	0	0	796	1.1	
Liberal Democrats	0	▼1	0	0	0	0	693	1.0	
Green	0	Steady	0	0	0	0	574	0.8	
BNP	0	Steady	0	0	0	0	134	0.2	
Wigan Real Labour	0	Steady	0	0	0	0	63	0.1	
TUSC	0	Steady	0	0	0	0	56	0.1	

== Ward results ==
=== Bolton West Constituency ===
==== Atherton ward ====
Local Elections 2014: Atherton
Party	Candidate	Votes	%	±%
Labour	Karen Joyce Aldred	1,494	48.1	
Independent	John Trevor Higson	1,106	35.6	
Conservative	Paul Fairhurst	374	12.1	
Left Unity	Craig Anthony Wilson	129	4.2	
Majority		388	12.5	
Turnout		3,103	27.5	
Labour hold		Swing		

=== Leigh Constituency ===
==== Astley Mosley Common ward ====
Local Elections 2014: Astley Mosley Common
Party	Candidate	Votes	%	±%
Labour	Barry John Taylor	1,812	67.6	
Conservative	Nasri Barghothi	867	32.4	
Majority		945	35.2	
Turnout		2,679	28.9	
Labour hold		Swing		

==== Atherleigh ward ====
Local Elections 2014: Atherleigh
Party	Candidate	Votes	%	±%
Labour	Pamela Stuart	1,152	49.5	
Independent	Stuart Andrew Gerrard	750	32.2	
Conservative	Denise Young	339	14.6	
Left Unity	Stephen Michael Hall	85	3.7	
Majority		402	17.3	
Turnout		2,326	26.7	
Labour hold		Swing		

==== Golborne and Lowton West ward ====
Local Elections 2014: Golborne and Lowton West
Party	Candidate	Votes	%	±%
Labour	Richard Andrew Barber	1,596	65.0	
Community Action	Abbey Aspey	456	18.6	
Conservative	Kathleen Houlton	403	16.4	
Majority		1,140	46.4	
Turnout		2,455	27.0	
Labour hold		Swing		

==== Leigh East ward ====
Local Elections 2014: Leigh East
Party	Candidate	Votes	%	±%
Labour	Frederick Brown Walker	1,633	70.9	
Conservative	Ian Aspinall	671	29.1	
Majority		962	41.8	
Turnout		2,304	24.9	
Labour hold		Swing		

==== Leigh South ward ====
Local Elections 2014: Leigh South
Party	Candidate	Votes	%	±%
Labour	Charles Rigby	1,955	65.5	
Conservative	Richard Alan Short	1,032	34.5	
Majority		923	31.0	
Turnout		2,987	28.6	
Labour hold		Swing		

==== Leigh West ward ====
Local Elections 2014: Leigh West
Party	Candidate	Votes	%	±%
Labour	Peter Richard Charles Smith	2,005	75.3	
Conservative	Andrew John Oxley	658	24.7	
Majority		1,347	50.6	
Turnout		2,663	24.9	
Labour hold		Swing		

==== Lowton East ward ====
Local Elections 2014: Lowton East
Party	Candidate	Votes	%	±%
Conservative	Edward Noel Houlton	1,603	46.2	
Labour	Eleanor Mary Blackburn	1,137	32.7	
UKIP	Sandra Margaret Atherton	589	17.0	
Community Action	Sophie Aspey	144	4.1	
Majority		466	13.5	
Turnout		3,473	35.1	
Conservative gain from Labour		Swing		

==== Tyldesley ward ====
Local Elections 2014: Tyldesley
Party	Candidate	Votes	%	±%
Labour	Joanne Marshall	1,821	65.6	
Conservative	Margaret Mary Winstanley	551	19.8	
Liberal Democrats	John Charles Skipworth	404	14.6	
Majority		1,270	45.8	
Turnout		2,776	26.4	
Labour gain from Liberal Democrats		Swing		

=== Makerfield Constituency ===
==== Abram ward ====
Local Elections 2014: Abram
Party	Candidate	Votes	%	±%
Labour	Carl Sweeney	1,580	57.4	
UKIP	Janet Markland	760	27.6	
Conservative	Joseph Sheedy	180	6.5	
BNP	Dennis Shambley	134	4.9	
Community Action	Susan Brown	101	3.7	
Majority		820	29.8	
Turnout		2,755	24.7	
Labour hold		Swing		

==== Ashton ward ====
Local Elections 2014: Ashton
Party	Candidate	Votes	%	±%
Labour	Nigel Dennis Ash	1,144	42.3	
UKIP	John Stuart Littler	591	21.9	
Independent	Peter Merry	403	14.9	
Community Action	Michael Moulding	395	14.6	
Conservative	Marie Winstanley	170	6.3	
Majority		553	20.4	
Turnout		2,703	29.6	
Labour hold		Swing		

==== Bryn ward ====
Local Elections 2014: Bryn
Party	Candidate	Votes	%	±%
Labour	Margaret Ann Rampling	1,190	40.2	
UKIP	Stephen Jones	724	24.5	
Independent	Brian Merry	625	21.1	
Liberal Democrats	Catherine Aspey	289	9.8	
Conservative	Susan Atherton	131	4.4	
Majority		466	15.7	
Turnout		2,959	31.8	
Labour hold		Swing		

==== Hindley ward ====
Local Elections 2014: Hindley
Party	Candidate	Votes	%	±%
Labour	James Talbot	1,418	53.1	
Independent	Brian Leslie Ellis	913	34.2	
Conservative	Gerald Joseph Houlton	263	9.8	
Left Unity	Ian Heyes	78	2.9	
Majority		505	18.9	
Turnout		2,672	26.4	
Labour hold		Swing		

==== Hindley Green ward ====
Local Elections 2014: Hindley Green
Party	Candidate	Votes	%	±%
Labour	David Keir Stitt	1,145	43.9	
Independent	John Melville Vickers	908	34.8	
Community Action	Kieron Creegan	325	12.5	
Conservative	Stephen Gerrard Holt	231	8.9	
Majority		237	9.1	
Turnout		2,609	29.7	
Labour hold		Swing		

==== Orrell ward ====
Local Elections 2014: Orrell
Party	Candidate	Votes	%	±%
Labour	David John Arrowsmith	1,102	34.9	
Conservative	Michael William Winstanley	1,031	32.6	
UKIP	Philip Easton	818	25.9	
Green	Norma Stout	210	6.6	
Majority		71	2.3	
Turnout		3,161	33.2	
Labour hold		Swing		

==== Winstanley ward ====
Local Elections 2014: Winstanley
Party	Candidate	Votes	%	±%
Labour	Clive William Morgan	1,177	44.1	
UKIP	Andrew Collinson	874	32.7	
Conservative	Allan Atherton	263	9.8	
Green	Steven Charles Heyes	208	7.8	
Community Action	Lee Aspey	149	5.6	
Majority		303	11.4	
Turnout		2,671	29.4	
Labour hold		Swing		

==== Worsley Mesnes ward ====
Local Elections 2014: Worsley Mesnes
Party	Candidate	Votes	%	±%
Labour	Patricia Lynne Holland	1,552	60.4	
UKIP	Gillian Mary Gibson	813	31.7	
Conservative	Judith Atherton	203	7.9	
Majority		739	28.7	
Turnout		2,568	28.2	
Labour hold		Swing		

=== Wigan Constituency ===
==== Aspull, New Springs and Whelley ward ====
Local Elections 2014: Aspull, New Springs and Whelley
Party	Candidate	Votes	%	±%
Labour	Ronald Josef Conway	1,581	46.0	
UKIP	Maureen McCoy	827	24.1	
Aspull and Standish Independent	Janet Brown	547	15.9	
Conservative	Linda Jane Surples	393	11.4	
Left Unity	John Stuart Bolton	88	2.6	
Majority		754	21.9	
Turnout		3,436	33.2	
Labour hold		Swing		

==== Douglas ward ====
Local Elections 2014: Douglas
Party	Candidate	Votes	%	±%
Labour	Shirley Ann Dewhurst	1,502	60.0	
UKIP	Derek Wilkes	790	31.6	
Conservative	Margaret Atherton	210	8.4	
Majority		712	28.4	
Turnout		2,502	24.9	
Labour hold		Swing		

==== Ince ward ====
Local Elections 2014: Ince
Party	Candidate	Votes	%	±%
Labour	James Moodie	1,397	56.8	
UKIP	Ross Allan Wright	851	34.6	
Conservative	Raymond Whittingham	133	5.4	
Left Unity	Janet Elizabeth Phillips	79	3.2	
Majority		546	22.2	
Turnout		2,460	26.1	
Labour hold		Swing		

==== Pemberton ward ====
Local Elections 2014: Pemberton
Party	Candidate	Votes	%	±%
Labour	Paul Prescott	1,632	62.7	
UKIP	Alan Freeman	692	26.6	
Conservative	Jonathon Charles Cartwright	195	7.5	
Left Unity	Adele Joanne Andrews	85	3.3	
Majority		940	36.1	
Turnout		2,604	25.4	
Labour hold		Swing		

==== Shevington with Lower Ground ward ====
Local Elections 2014: Shevington with Lower Ground
Party	Candidate	Votes	%	±%
Labour	Michael John Crosby	1,050	33.3	
Shevington Independents	Angela Maria Bland	797	25.3	
UKIP	Arnold Jefferson Foster	797	25.3	
Conservative	Claire Houlton	353	11.2	
Green	Joseph Robert Rylance	156	4.9	
Majority		253	8.0	
Turnout		3,153	33.5	
Labour hold		Swing		

"Shevington Independents" is a description used by candidates for the Wigan Independents.

==== Standish with Langtree ward ====
Local Elections 2014: Standish with Langtree
Party	Candidate	Votes	%	±%
Standish Independents	Deborah Fairhurst	1,543	42.6	
Conservative	David Marcus Jon Ollerton	701	19.4	
Labour	Deborah Gaye Parkinson	646	17.9	
UKIP	Joanne Bradley	590	16.3	
Wigan Real Labour	Emma Jayne Mcgurrin	63	1.7	
TUSC	Joanne Bradley	56	1.5	
Community Action	Daniel Willson	20	0.6	
Majority		842	23.2	
Turnout		3,619	36.7	
Standish Independents gain from Labour				

"Standish Independents" is a description used by candidates for the Wigan Independents.

==== Wigan Central ward ====
Local Elections 2014: Wigan Central
Party	Candidate	Votes	%	±%
Labour	George Davies	1,618	51.8	
UKIP	Keith Robert Jones	893	28.6	
Conservative	Callum David Owen Chadwick	614	19.6	
Majority		725	23.2	
Turnout		3,125	33.2	
Labour hold		Swing		

==== Wigan West ward ====
Local Elections 2014: Wigan West
Party	Candidate	Votes	%	±%
Labour	Pyhllis Mary Cullen	1,726	60.6	
UKIP	John Stanley Atherton	718	25.2	
Left Unity	Hazel Duffy	252	8.8	
Conservative	Jean Peet	153	5.4	
Majority		1,008	35.4	
Turnout		2,849	28.1	
Labour hold		Swing		

== By-elections between 2014 and 2015 ==
=== Douglas ward ===
Douglas, 13 November 2014
Party	Candidate	Votes	%	±%
Labour	Maggie Skilling	874	59.3	
UKIP	Derek Wilkes	452	30.7	
Conservative	Margaret Atherton	80	5.4	
Green	Damien Hendry	37	2.5	
Community Action	Michael Moulding	29	2.0	
Majority		422	28.6	
Turnout		1,474	14.5	
Labour hold		Swing		
