= 2021 Wigan Metropolitan Borough Council election =

2021 local election in England

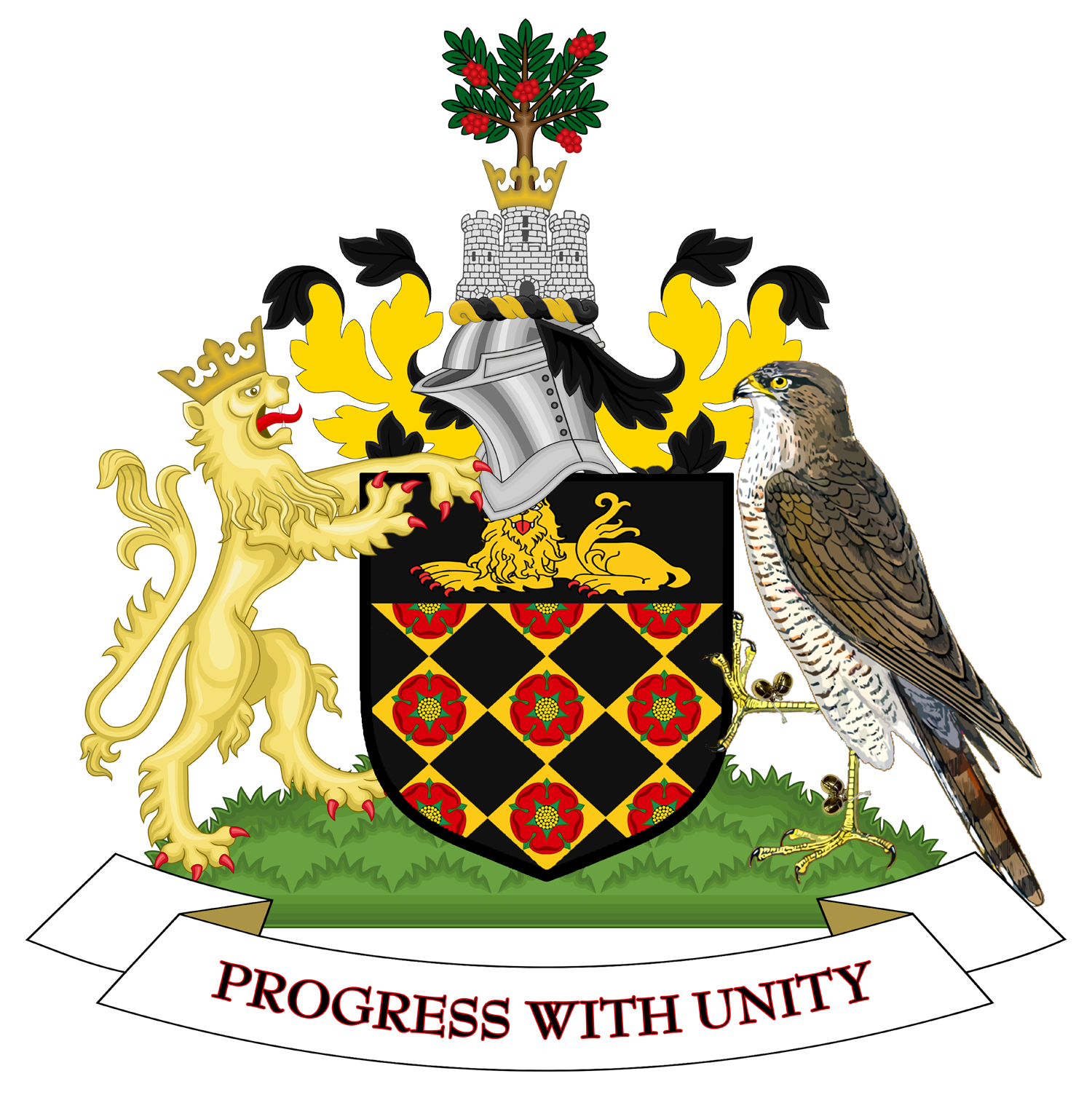
- 6 May 2021

26 of 75 seats to Wigan Metropolitan Borough Council 38 seats needed for a majority
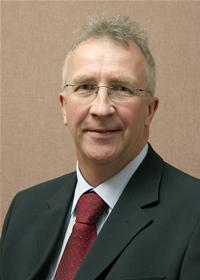

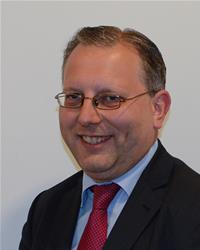
	First party	Second party
Leader	David Molyneux	Michael Winstanley
Party	Labour	Conservative
Leader since	15 May 2018	11 May 2016
Leader's seat	Ince	Orrell
Seats before	57	8
Seats after	57	8
Seat change	Steady	Steady
- 2021 local election results in Wigan. Labour Conservative Labour and Co-op Independent Independent Network

The 2021 Wigan Metropolitan Borough Council election took place on 6 May 2021 to elect members of Wigan Metropolitan Borough Council in England. This election was held on the same day as other local elections. The election was originally due to take place on 7 May 2020, but was postponed due to the COVID-19 pandemic. A by-election was held on the same day in Orrell ward to fill the seat left vacant by the death of Conservative councillor Richard Clayton.

== Overview ==
Prior to the election, the composition of the council was:

- Labour Party: 57
- Conservative Party: 7
- Independent: 10
- Vacant: 1

After the election, the composition of the council was:

- Labour Party: 57
- Conservative Party: 8
- Independent: 10

Number of Candidates fielded per party
Party	Number of Candidates
Labour Party	26
Conservative Party	26
Liberal Democrats	23
Independents	13
Leigh, Atherton & Tyldesley Together	6
UKIP	1
Reform UK	1
Standish Independents	1

== Results summary ==
2021 Wigan Metropolitan Borough Council election
Party	This election				Full council			This election		
Party	Candidates	Seats	Net	Seats %	Other	Total	Total %	Votes	Votes %	+/−
Labour	{{{candidates}}}	19	Steady	73.1	38	57	76.0	37,261	49.8	Steady
Conservative	{{{candidates}}}	4	Steady	15.4	4	8	10.7	22,788	30.4	▲13.4
Independent	{{{candidates}}}	3	Steady	11.5	7	10	13.3	8,945	12.0	▲1.8
Liberal Democrats	{{{candidates}}}	0	Steady	0.0	0	0	0.0	3,212	4.3	▲2.7
Leigh, Atherton & Tyldesley Together	{{{candidates}}}	0	Steady	0.0	0	0	0.0	1,628	2.2	New
Standish Independents	{{{candidates}}}	0	Steady	0.0	0	0	0.0	644	0.9	New
UKIP	{{{candidates}}}	0	Steady	0.0	0	0	0.0	242	0.3	▼16.3
Reform	{{{candidates}}}	0	Steady	0.0	0	0	0.0	121	0.2	New

== Ward results ==
=== Bolton West constituency ===
==== Atherton ward ====
Local Elections 2021: Atherton
Party	Candidate	Votes	%	±%
Independent	Jamie Hodgkinson	1,669	50.4	▼0.9
Labour	Julie Ann Hilling	998	30.2	▲3.2
Conservative	Emily Jane Siddall	412	12.4	▲6.6
Leigh, Atherton & Tyldesley Together	Quinton John Smith	231	7.0	New
Majority		671	20.2	▼4.1
Turnout		3,310	29.7	▼4.5
Independent hold		Swing		

=== Leigh constituency ===
==== Astley Mosley Common ward ====
Local Elections 2021: Astley Mosley Common
Party	Candidate	Votes	%	±%
Labour	Paula Anne Wakefield	1,978	57.3	▲6.0
Conservative	David John Stirzaker	1,476	42.7	▲18.2
Majority		502	14.6	▼12.2
Turnout		3,454	34.2	▼1.2
Labour hold		Swing		

==== Atherleigh ward ====
Local Elections 2021: Atherleigh
Party	Candidate	Votes	%	±%
Labour	John Arthur Harding	1,073	43.9	▼2.5
Conservative	Paul Lambert Fairhurst	610	24.9	▲15.9
Independent	Natasha Louise Hodgkinson	587	24.0	New
Leigh, Atherton & Tyldesley Together	Zoë Irlam	112	4.6	New
Liberal Democrats	Lorraine Gillon	63	2.6	▲0.5
Majority		463	19.0	▼4.2
Turnout		2,445	29.0	▲0.8
Labour hold		Swing		

==== Golborne and Lowton West ward ====
Local Elections 2021: Golborne and Lowton West
Party	Candidate	Votes	%	±%
Labour	Yvonne Marie Klieve	1,619	56.2	▼14.0
Conservative	Stanley Crook	925	32.1	▲25.0
Independent	Susan Jillian Spibey	276	9.6	New
Liberal Democrats	Brian Edward Witt	62	2.2	New
Majority		694	24.1	▼23.5
Turnout		2,882	32.0	▲4.2
Labour hold		Swing		

==== Leigh East ward ====
Local Elections 2021: Leigh East
Party	Candidate	Votes	%	±%
Labour	Keith Cunliffe	1,353	49.6	▼18.1
Conservative	James Falle Geddes	584	21.4	▲1.4
Independent	Trevor Barton	473	17.3	New
Leigh, Atherton & Tyldesley Together	James Edward Morley	249	9.1	New
Liberal Democrats	Lewis David Parkin	69	2.5	▼9.8
Majority		769	28.2	▼19.5
Turnout		2,728	29.4	▲3.9
Labour hold		Swing		

==== Leigh South ward ====
Local Elections 2021: Leigh South
Party	Candidate	Votes	%	±%
Labour	Kevin Anderson	1,695	49.0	▼6.6
Conservative	Joshua James Yates	1,423	41.1	▲25.3
Leigh, Atherton & Tyldesley Together	Dave Fraser	213	6.2	New
Liberal Democrats	Simon Paul Brooks	131	3.8	New
Majority		272	7.9	▼19.1
Turnout		3,462	33.3	▲1.7
Labour hold		Swing		

==== Leigh West ward ====
Local Elections 2021: Leigh West
Party	Candidate	Votes	%	±%
Labour	Sue Greensmith	1,582	56.6	▼3.4
Conservative	Gerald Joseph Houlton	714	25.6	▲18.0
Leigh, Atherton & Tyldesley Together	Jayson Michael Allan Lomax-Hargreaves	394	14.1	New
Liberal Democrats	Sharron-Lee Honey	104	3.7	New
Majority		868	31.0	▼1.5
Turnout		2,794	25.6	▼1.2
Labour hold		Swing		

==== Lowton East ward ====
Local Elections 2021: Lowton East
Party	Candidate	Votes	%	±%
Conservative	Marie Elizabeth Cooper	2,395	59.4	▼1.5
Labour	Gary Peter Lloyd	1,516	37.6	▲8.5
Liberal Democrats	Christopher John Noon	123	3.0	New
Majority		879	21.8	▼10.0
Turnout		4,034	38.6	▼1.7
Conservative hold		Swing		

==== Tyldesley ward ====
Local Elections 2021: Tyldesley
Party	Candidate	Votes	%	±%
Labour	Nazia Tabussam Rehman	1,559	48.7	▲10.2
Conservative	Susan Atherton	771	24.1	▲11.0
Leigh, Atherton & Tyldesley Together	Julian David Marsh	429	13.4	New
Liberal Democrats	Jack Eiddon Davies	213	6.7	New
Reform	James Anthony Fish	121	3.8	New
Independent	Antonino Panebianco	105	3.3	New
Majority		788	24.6	▲16.6
Turnout		3,198	31.2	▼0.5
Labour hold		Swing		

=== Makerfield constituency ===
==== Abram ward ====
Local Elections 2021: Abram
Party	Candidate	Votes	%	±%
Labour	Martyn Smethurst	1,411	55.5	▼2.8
Conservative	Beverley Anne Bridgwater	628	24.7	▲16.9
Independent	David William Bowker	425	16.7	New
Liberal Democrats	Daniel Jack Simm	77	3.0	New
Majority		783	30.8	▲6.4
Turnout		2,541	23.7	▼1.8
Labour hold		Swing		

==== Ashton ward ====
Local Elections 2021: Ashton
Party	Candidate	Votes	%	±%
Labour	Danny Fletcher	1,572	61.5	▲15.0
Conservative	Edward Francis Sturdy	860	33.6	▲23.8
Liberal Democrats	Geoffrey Stephen Matthews	125	4.9	▲1.5
Majority		712	27.9	▲5.2
Turnout		2,557	29.3	▼0.3
Labour hold		Swing		

==== Bryn ward ====
Local Elections 2021: Bryn
Party	Candidate	Votes	%	±%
Independent	Steve Jones	2,047	67.0	▲25.9
Labour	Mary Gwendoline Callaghan	703	23.0	▼15.4
Conservative	Judith Atherton	252	8.3	▲2.8
Liberal Democrats	Denise Melling	51	1.7	New
Majority		1,344	44.0	▲41.3
Turnout		3,053	34.7	▲1.1
Independent hold		Swing		

==== Hindley ward ====
Local Elections 2021: Hindley
Party	Candidate	Votes	%	±%
Labour	Paul John Blay	1,497	57.4	▲6.2
Conservative	Mark Michael Temperton	422	16.2	▲10.7
Independent	Alan Leslie Baines	305	11.7	New
Independent	Hilda Bridget Byrne	292	11.2	New
Liberal Democrats	John Charles Skipworth	91	3.5	▲0.7
Majority		1,075	41.2	▲27.7
Turnout		2,607	27.2	▼2.2
Labour hold		Swing		

==== Hindley Green ward ====
Local Elections 2021: Hindley Green
Party	Candidate	Votes	%	±%
Independent	Bob Brierley	1,066	40.7	▼16.6
Labour	James Thomas Palmer	1,058	40.4	▲8.7
Conservative	Paul John Chapman	455	17.4	▲12.5
Liberal Democrats	Graham Trevor Suddick	37	1.4	▼4.8
Majority		8	0.3	▼25.3
Turnout		2,616	29.7	▲2.3
Independent hold		Swing		

==== Orrell ward ====
Local Elections 2021: Orrell (2 seats)
Party	Candidate	Votes	%	±%
Conservative	Marjorie Clayton (Elected to 2023)	1,540	46.2	▲3.0
Conservative	Michael William Winstanley (Elected to 2022)	1,456	43.7	▼2.8
Labour	Mark Ian Tebbutt	1,285	38.6	▼2.2
Labour	Joseph Christopher Saunders	1,140	34.2	▼7.2
Liberal Democrats	Neil Duncan Stevenson	225	6.8	▲3.4
Liberal Democrats	Stuart David Thomas	110	3.3	▼8.6
Majority		255	7.6	N/A
Turnout		3,332	35.1	▲0.2
Conservative hold		Swing		
Conservative hold		Swing		

In the percentage change column, the candidate with the most votes from each party is compared with the 2016 Orrell ward result, whilst the candidate with the fewest votes from each party is compared with the 2018 Orrell ward result.

==== Winstanley ward ====
Local Elections 2021: Winstanley
Party	Candidate	Votes	%	±%
Labour	Paul Terrence Kenny	1,614	58.1	▲9.9
Conservative	Michael Colin Owens	801	28.8	▲16.9
Liberal Democrats	Robert Duncan Stevenson	365	13.1	New
Majority		813	29.3	▲12.9
Turnout		2,780	30.5	▼1.0
Labour hold		Swing		

==== Worsley Mesnes ward ====
Local Elections 2021: Worsley Mesnes
Party	Candidate	Votes	%	±%
Labour	David Roland Hurst	1,549	64.1	▲4.2
Conservative	Cyril Pendlebury	565	23.4	▲14.3
Independent	Danny Cooke	242	10.0	New
Liberal Democrats	John Parrott	61	2.5	New
Majority		984	40.7	▲9.7
Turnout		2,417	27.0	▼0.7
Labour hold		Swing		

=== Wigan constituency ===
==== Aspull, New Springs and Whelley ward ====
Local Elections 2021: Aspull, New Springs and Whelley
Party	Candidate	Votes	%	±%
Labour	Laura Jean Flynn	1,736	50.8	▼2.0
Conservative	Luke Christian Marsden	853	24.9	▲11.6
Independent	John Arnold Hulme	719	21.0	New
Liberal Democrats	Andrew Julian Lee Holland	112	3.3	▼1.8
Majority		883	25.9	▲1.9
Turnout		3,420	34.4	▼0.7
Labour hold		Swing		

==== Douglas ward ====
Local Elections 2021: Douglas
Party	Candidate	Votes	%	±%
Labour	Patricia Draper	1,535	70.1	▼14.0
Conservative	Margaret Atherton	495	22.6	▲6.7
Liberal Democrats	Donald John Macnamara	159	7.3	New
Majority		1,040	47.5	▼20.8
Turnout		2,189	22.9	▼0.4
Labour hold		Swing		

==== Ince ward ====
Local Elections 2021: Ince
Party	Candidate	Votes	%	±%
Labour	David Trevor Molyneux	1,289	67.8	▲2.0
Conservative	Allan Atherton	369	19.4	▲13.8
UKIP	Jordan James Gaskell	242	12.7	▼15.9
Majority		920	48.4	▲11.2
Turnout		1,900	21.7	▼5.6
Labour hold		Swing		

==== Pemberton ward ====
Local Elections 2021: Pemberton
Party	Candidate	Votes	%	±%
Labour	Jeanette Prescott	1,476	69.2	▲0.2
Conservative	Jean Margaret Peet	477	22.4	▲16.6
Liberal Democrats	David John Burley	180	8.4	New
Majority		999	46.8	▼0.9
Turnout		2,133	22.4	▼2.5
Labour hold		Swing		

==== Shevington with Lower Ground ward ====
Local Elections 2021: Shevington with Lower Ground
Party	Candidate	Votes	%	±%
Labour	Michael John Crosby	1,432	44.9	▲4.9
Conservative	Gary Robinson	798	25.0	▲13.7
Shevington Independents	Gareth William Fairhurst	739	23.2	▼3.1
Liberal Democrats	Brian Craig Duff Crombie-Fisher	220	6.9	New
Majority		634	19.9	▲6.1
Turnout		3,189	34.8	▲0.6
Labour hold		Swing		

==== Standish with Langtree ward ====
Local Elections 2021: Standish with Langtree
Party	Candidate	Votes	%	±%
Conservative	Raymond Whittingham	1,997	54.7	▲22.3
Labour	Dave Wood	911	25.0	▲0.4
Standish Independents	Debbie Fairhurst	644	17.7	▼9.3
Liberal Democrats	Caroline Waddicor	96	2.6	New
Majority		1,086	29.7	▲24.3
Turnout		3,648	34.0	▼7.4
Conservative hold		Swing		

The "Standish Independents" description was used at the last election by the Wigan Independents, a separate political party.

==== Wigan Central ward ====
Local Elections 2021: Wigan Central
Party	Candidate	Votes	%	±%
Labour	Lawrence Hunt	2,016	63.1	▲7.2
Conservative	Joe Worthington	938	29.3	▲2.2
Liberal Democrats	Benjamin James Thomas	243	7.6	▲0.6
Majority		1,078	33.8	▲5.0
Turnout		3,197	34.4	▼0.3
Labour hold		Swing		

==== Wigan West ward ====
Local Elections 2021: Wigan West
Party	Candidate	Votes	%	±%
Labour	Terrence William Halliwell	1,664	65.7	▼15.1
Conservative	Marie Winstanley	572	22.6	▲3.4
Liberal Democrats	Ian Dyer	295	11.7	New
Majority		1,092	43.1	▼18.5
Turnout		2,531	26.2	▼1.7
Labour hold		Swing		

== By-elections between 2021 and 2022 ==
=== Leigh West ward ===
Leigh West, 14 October 2021
Party	Candidate	Votes	%	±%
Labour	Samantha Brown	1,004	55.9	▲2.0
Conservative	James Geddes	432	24.1	▲8.7
Leigh West Independent	Jayson Michael Allan Lomax-Hargreaves	257	14.3	▼9.5
Liberal Democrats	Sharron-Lee Honey	103	5.7	▼0.8
Majority		572	31.8	▲1.7
Turnout		1,796	16.0	▼7.1
Labour hold		Swing		

=== Bryn ward ===
Bryn, 25 November 2021
Party	Candidate	Votes	%	±%
Labour	Samuel Flemming	429	31.2	▲8.2
Independent	James Alan Richardson	412	30.0	New
Independent	Gareth William Fairhurst	353	25.7	New
Conservative	Paul Martin	142	10.3	▲2.1
Liberal Democrats	David John Burley	38	2.8	▲1.1
Majority		17	1.2	N/A
Turnout		1,374	15.0	▼19.7
Labour gain from Independent		Swing		
