= Atherleigh =

- Electoral ward
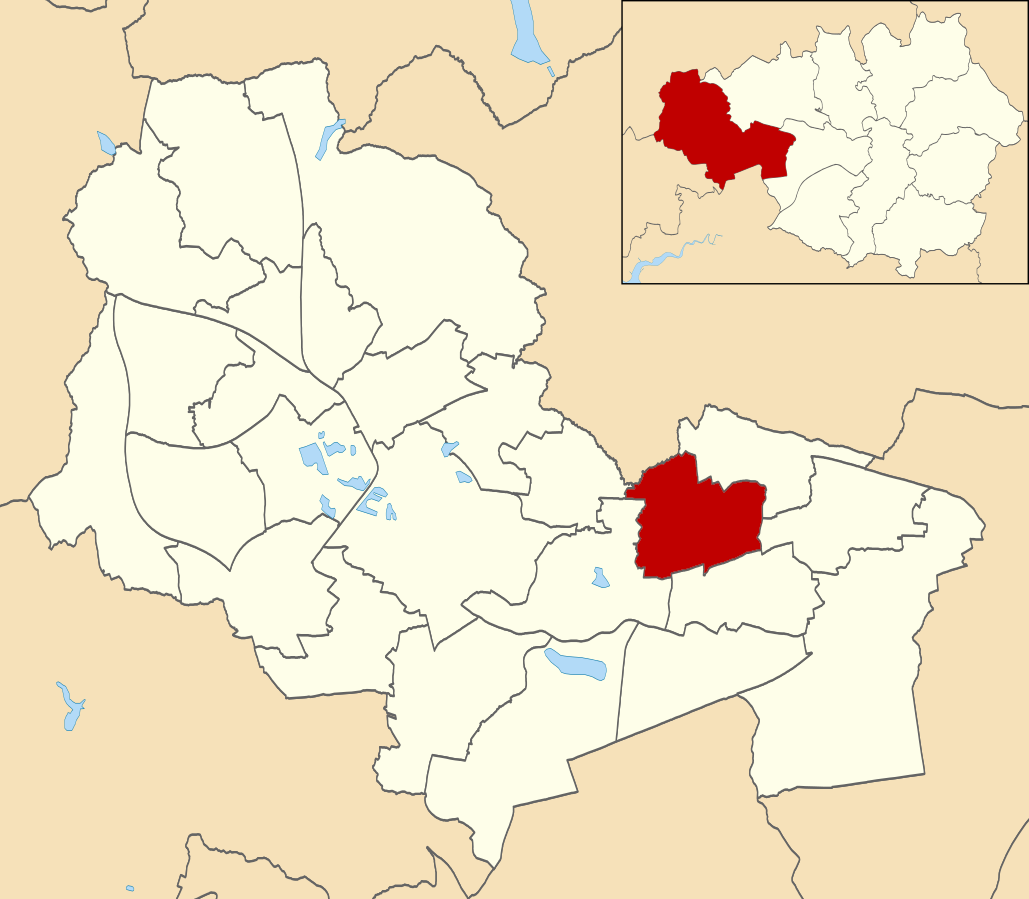
- Atherleigh ward within Wigan Metropolitan Borough Council

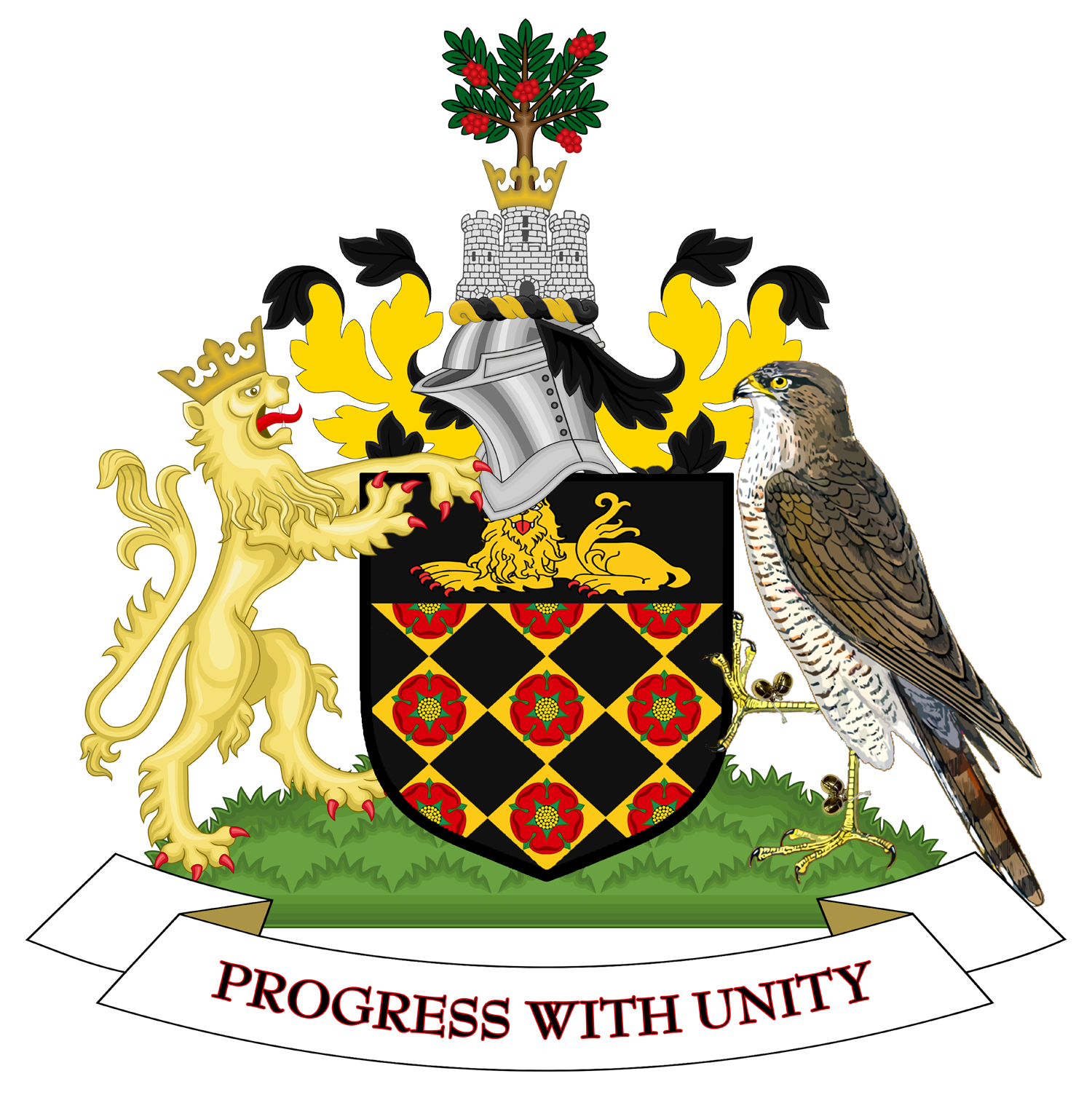
- Coat of arms
- Motto: Progress with Unity
- Interactive map of Atherleigh
- Coordinates: 53.5160°N 2.5107°W
- Country: United Kingdom
- Constituent country: England
- Region: North West England
- County: Greater Manchester
- Metropolitan borough: Wigan
- Created: May 2004

Government
  - Type: Unicameral
  - Body: Wigan Metropolitan Borough Council
  - Mayor of Wigan: Sue Greensmith (Labour)
  - Councillor: Mark Aldred (Labour)
  - Councillor: John Harding (Labour)
  - Councillor: Debra Wailes (Labour)

Population
  - Total: 11,953

Atherleigh is an electoral ward in Leigh, England. It forms part of Wigan Metropolitan Borough Council, as well as the parliamentary constituency of Leigh.

== Councillors ==
The ward is represented by three councillors: Mark Aldred (Lab), John Harding (Lab), and Debra Wailes (Lab).
