= 2011 Wigan Metropolitan Borough Council election =

2011 UK local government election

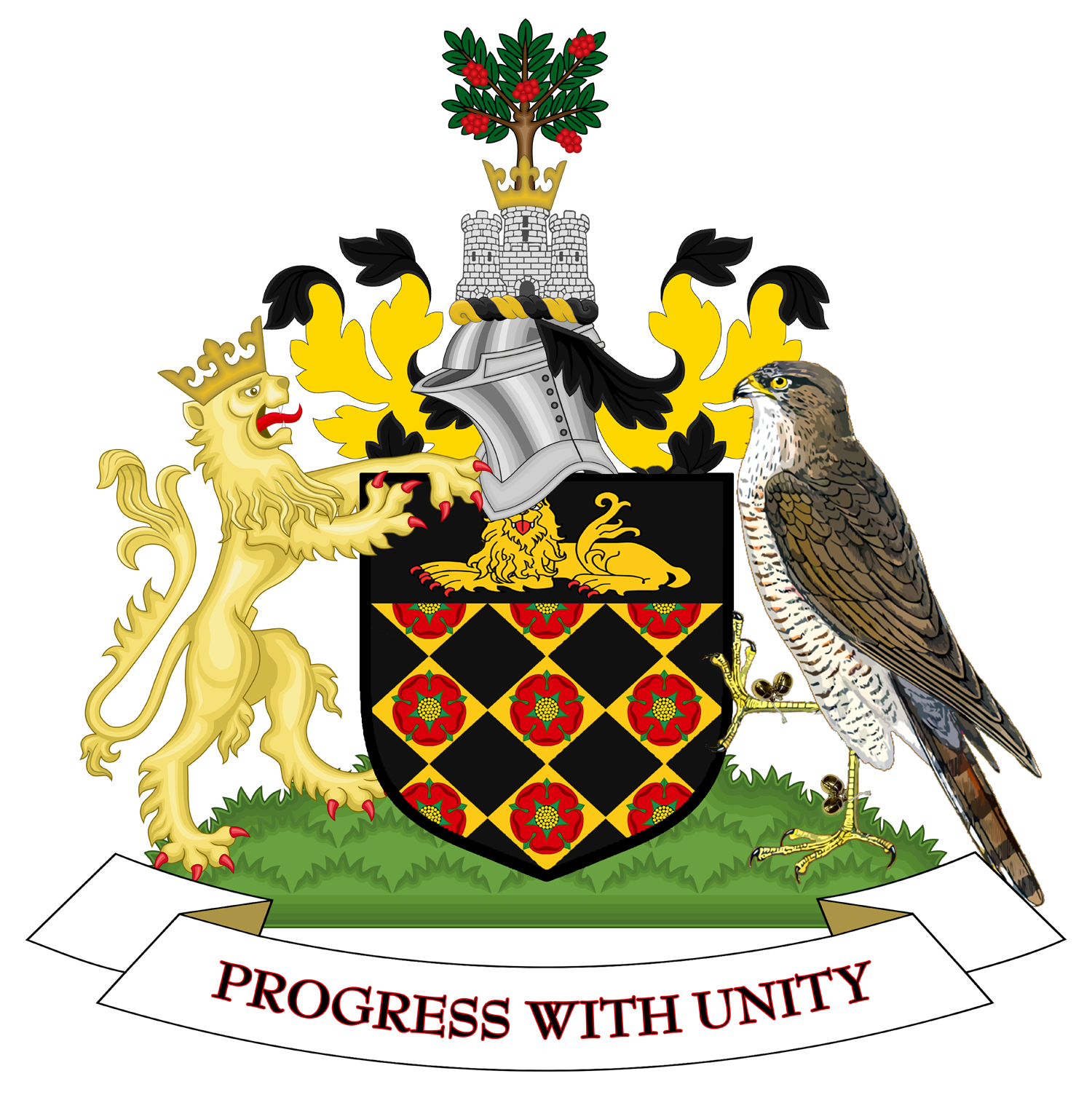
- 5 May 2011
Party	Labour	Independent
- 2011 local election results in Wigan. Labour Independent Standish Independents

Elections to Wigan Council were held in May 2011. One-third of the council was up for election. These elections were held as part of the 2011 United Kingdom local elections.

== Election result ==
Wigan local election result 2011
Party	Seats	Gains	Losses	Net gain/loss	Seats %	Votes %	Votes	+/−
Labour	21	6	0	+6	84.0	54.5	43,384	+8.6%
Independent	3	1	1	0	12.0	12.6	10,046	+5.2%
Wigan Independent Conservatives	1	0	1	-1	4.0	3.5	2,809	+0.4%
Conservative	0	0	2	-2	0.0	19.6	15,603	+0.8%
Community Action	0	0	2	-2	0.0	4.8	3,836	-3.2%
Liberal Democrats	0	0	1	-1	0.0	2.7	2,159	-6.2%
BNP	0	0	0	0	0.0	1.0	777	-5.5%
UKIP	0	0	0	0	0.0	0.6	498	-0.7%
TUSC	0	0	0	0	0.0	0.4	320	+0.4%
England First	0	0	0	0	0.0	0.1	114	+0.0%

This result had the following consequences for the total number of seats on the council after the elections:

Party	Previous council	New council
Labour	52	58
Independent	7	7
Conservative	7	5
Community Action	4	2
Liberal Democrat	3	2
Wigan Independent Conservative	2	1
BNP	0	0
UKIP	0	0
Trade Unionist & Socialist	0	0
England First	0	0
Total	75	75
Working majority	29	41

== Ward results ==
=== Abram ===
Abram
Party	Candidate	Votes	%	±%
Labour	Eunice Smethurst	1,696	56.6	+3.8
Independent	Sandra Atherton	774	25.8	+9.3
Conservative	Marion Green	271	9.0	−3.3
BNP	Dennis Shambley	242	8.1	−4.1
Rejected ballots		16	0.5	+0.2
Majority		922	30.7	−5.4
Turnout		2,999	28.2	−23.6
Labour hold		Swing	-2.7	

=== Ashton ===
Ashton
Party	Candidate	Votes	%	±%
Labour	Joel Haddley	1,595	48.5	+9.7
Independent	Walter Carney	710	21.6	+11.5
Community Action	Leanne Brotherton	626	19.0	−15.7
Conservative	Marie Winstanley	344	10.4	+0.4
Rejected ballots		17	0.5	+0.2
Majority		885	26.9	+22.9
Turnout		3,292	36.0	−27.1
Labour gain from Independent		Swing	-0.9	

=== Aspull, New Springs, Whelley ===
Aspull, New Springs, Whelley
Party	Candidate	Votes	%	±%
Labour	Christopher Ready	2,509	65.7	+16.1
Liberal Democrats	Alan Robinson	796	20.8	−2.4
Conservative	Jane Surples	482	12.6	−6.0
Rejected ballots		34	0.9	+0.6
Majority		1,713	44.8	+18.5
Turnout		3,821	37.5	−26.6
Labour hold		Swing	+9.2	

=== Astley Mosley Common ===
Astley Mosley Common
Party	Candidate	Votes	%	±%
Labour	Brendan Bowen	2,028	62.7	+23.1
Conservative	Nasri Barghothi	1,158	35.8	+8.1
Rejected ballots		50	1.5	+0.8
Majority		870	26.9	+19.4
Turnout		3,236	34.4	−28.7
Labour hold		Swing	+7.5	

=== Atherleigh ===
Atherleigh
Party	Candidate	Votes	%	±%
Labour	Mark Aldred	1,499	58.9	+15.6
Independent	Jamie Hodgkinson	537	21.1	+11.6
Conservative	Derek Davies	491	19.3	+0.8
Rejected ballots		18	0.7	+0.7
Majority		962	37.8	+13.0
Turnout		2,545	29.6	−26.4
Labour hold		Swing	+2.0	

=== Atherton ===
Atherton
Party	Candidate	Votes	%	±%
Independent	Norman Bradbury	1,517	42.6	+28.6
Labour	David Welch	1,271	35.7	−9.5
Conservative	Vivienne Lee	437	12.3	−3.5
TUSC	Stephen Hall	320	9.0	+9.0
Rejected ballots		17	0.5	+0.0
Majority		246	6.9	−22.5
Turnout		3,562	32.3	−24.7
Independent hold		Swing	+19.0	

=== Bryn ===
Bryn
Party	Candidate	Votes	%	±%
Independent	Gary Wilkes	1,955	54.2	+24.2
Labour	John Allen	1,363	37.8	−2.4
Conservative	Stuart Foy	274	7.6	−1.7
Rejected ballots		17	0.5	+0.0
Majority		592	16.4	+6.2
Turnout		3,609	39.0	−23.4
Independent hold		Swing	+13.3	

=== Douglas ===
Douglas
Party	Candidate	Votes	%	±%
Labour	Michael Dewhurst	1,867	71.9	+13.2
Independent	Anthony Unsworth	393	15.1	+7.0
Conservative	Margaret Atherton	321	12.4	−1.7
Rejected ballots		16	0.6	-0.1
Majority		1,474	56.8	+12.2
Turnout		2,597	26.5	−22.5
Labour hold		Swing	+3.1	

=== Golborne Lowton West ===
Golborne Lowton West
Party	Candidate	Votes	%	±%
Labour	Stuart Keane	1,897	60.1	+10.2
Community Action	Peter Franzen	849	26.9	−1.1
Conservative	Kathleen Houlton	389	12.3	−2.8
Rejected ballots		19	0.6	+0.1
Majority		1,048	33.2	+11.3
Turnout		3,154	35.0	−22.9
Labour hold		Swing	+5.6	

=== Hindley ===
Hindley
Party	Candidate	Votes	%	±%
Labour	James Churton	1,831	59.2	+9.9
Independent	David Culshaw	1,000	32.3	+6.4
Conservative	Stephen Holt	251	8.1	−3.6
Rejected ballots		12	0.4	-0.2
Majority		831	26.9	+3.5
Turnout		3,094	30.7	−22.0
Labour hold		Swing	+1.7	

=== Hindley Green ===
Hindley Green
Party	Candidate	Votes	%	±%
Independent	Francis Carmichael	1,185	39.7	+11.7
Labour	Romana Kowalczuk	927	31.1	−0.4
Community Action	Barry Fagan	626	21.0	+0.3
Conservative	Margaret Winstanley	232	7.8	−3.5
Rejected ballots		14	0.5	-0.1
Majority		258	8.6	+5.1
Turnout		2,984	34.6	−27.1
Independent gain from Community Action		Swing	+6.0	

=== Ince ===
Ince
Party	Candidate	Votes	%	±%
Labour	Janice Sharratt	1,679	66.5	+5.6
BNP	Anthony Farrell	296	11.7	−1.8
Independent	Brian Kenrick	243	9.6	+4.3
Conservative	Raymond Whittingham	177	7.0	−2.5
England First	Robert Hague	114	4.5	+1.3
Rejected ballots		17	0.7	+0.2
Majority		1,383	54.8	+7.5
Turnout		2,526	28.2	−20.1
Labour hold		Swing	+3.7	

=== Leigh East ===
Leigh East
Party	Candidate	Votes	%	±%
Labour	Anita Thorpe	1,835	69.0	+20.9
Conservative	Richard Short	785	29.5	+6.0
Rejected ballots		38	1.4	+0.4
Majority		1,050	39.5	+18.6
Turnout		2,658	28.5	−27.3
Labour hold		Swing	+7.4	

=== Leigh South ===
Leigh South
Party	Candidate	Votes	%	±%
Labour	John O'Brien	2,180	61.5	+20.7
Conservative	Stanley Walker	885	25.0	+6.0
Community Action	Stuart Preston	450	12.7	+3.4
Rejected ballots		29	0.8	+0.4
Majority		1,295	36.5	+14.7
Turnout		3,544	34.2	−27.4
Labour hold		Swing	+7.3	

=== Leigh West ===
Leigh West
Party	Candidate	Votes	%	±%
Labour	Myra Whiteside	1,844	64.2	+17.7
Independent	Brian Turrell	430	15.0	+5.1
Conservative	John Oxley	334	11.6	+1.3
BNP	Martin Grainey	239	8.3	−4.5
Rejected ballots		24	0.8	+0.3
Majority		1,414	49.3	+18.1
Turnout		2,871	26.3	−25.0
Labour hold		Swing	+6.3	

=== Lowton East ===
Lowton East
Party	Candidate	Votes	%	±%
Labour	Pamela Gilligan	1,561	40.8	+2.8
Conservative	Ed Houlton	1,546	40.4	+3.8
Community Action	Ian Franzen	710	18.5	−6.6
Rejected ballots		11	0.3	+0.0
Majority		15	0.4	−1.0
Turnout		3,828	39.3	−26.3
Labour gain from Community Action		Swing	-0.5	

=== Orrell ===
Orrell
Party	Candidate	Votes	%	±%
Labour	Stephen Murphy	1,825	48.4	+2.3
Conservative	Michael Winstanley	1,693	44.9	+7.7
Independent	Brian Merry	236	6.3	+6.3
Rejected ballots		16	0.4	-0.5
Majority		132	3.5	−5.5
Turnout		3,770	40.5	−27.0
Labour gain from Conservative		Swing	-2.7	

=== Pemberton ===
Pemberton
Party	Candidate	Votes	%	±%
Labour	Barbara Bourne	1,864	70.9	+5.4
Community Action	Michael Leyland	377	14.3	+5.2
Conservative	Jonathan Cartwright	360	13.7	+1.1
Rejected ballots		29	1.1	+0.5
Majority		1,487	56.5	+3.6
Turnout		2,630	26.7	−23.4
Labour hold		Swing	+0.1	

=== Shevington with Lower Ground ===
Shevington with Lower Ground
Party	Candidate	Votes	%	±%
Labour	Paul Collins	1,557	41.7	+7.4
Conservative	Callum Chadwick	974	26.1	+4.0
Ind. Conservative	Deborah Fairhurst	672	18.0	−1.1
UKIP	Arnold Foster	498	13.3	+4.9
Rejected ballots		35	0.9	+0.5
Majority		583	15.6	+3.4
Turnout		3,736	39.9	−28.5
Labour gain from Ind. Conservative		Swing	+1.7	

=== Standish with Langtree ===
Standish with Langtree
Party	Candidate	Votes	%	±%
Ind. Conservative	George Fairhurst	1,672	43.1	+27.5
Labour	Andrew Birchall	1,336	34.4	+2.4
Conservative	Steven Surples	848	21.8	−7.1
Rejected ballots		27	0.7	+0.5
Majority		336	8.7	+5.6
Turnout		3,883	39.8	−28.6
Ind. Conservative hold		Swing	+12.5	

=== Tyldesley ===
Tyldesley
Party	Candidate	Votes	%	±%
Labour	Stephen Hellier	1,529	46.8	+14.7
Liberal Democrats	Keith McManus	1,363	41.7	+2.1
Conservative	David Ollerton	357	10.9	−5.0
Rejected ballots		21	0.6	+0.4
Majority		166	5.1	−2.4
Turnout		3,270	31.9	−26.4
Labour gain from Liberal Democrats		Swing	+6.3	

=== Wigan Central ===
Wigan Central
Party	Candidate	Votes	%	±%
Labour	Michael McLoughlin	1,684	47.6	+5.7
Conservative	Jean Peet	1,161	32.8	+7.1
Ind. Conservative	Gareth Fairhurst	465	13.1	−5.3
Community Action	Robert Hall	198	5.6	+5.6
Rejected ballots		33	0.9	+0.1
Majority		523	14.8	−1.4
Turnout		3,541	37.8	−26.9
Labour gain from Conservative		Swing	-0.7	

=== Wigan West ===
Wigan West
Party	Candidate	Votes	%	±%
Labour	Stephen Dawber	2,301	74.6	+13.1
Conservative	Barry Alder	739	23.7	+6.3
Rejected ballots		54	1.8	+0.9
Majority		1,571	50.9	+6.8
Turnout		3,085	30.7	−26.7
Labour hold		Swing	+3.4	

=== Winstanley ===
Winstanley
Party	Candidate	Votes	%	±%
Labour	Rona Winkworth	1,509	47.9	+4.5
Independent	Christine Shore	1,066	33.8	+11.3
Conservative	Michael Nicholls	552	17.5	+2.5
Rejected ballots		24	0.8	+0.5
Majority		443	14.1	−6.8
Turnout		3,151	35.5	−29.3
Labour hold		Swing	-3.4	

=== Worsley Mesnes ===
Worsley Mesnes
Party	Candidate	Votes	%	±%
Labour	William Rotherham	2,197	79.5	+15.0
Conservative	Joseph Sheedy	551	19.9	+3.1
Rejected ballots		17	0.6	-0.2
Majority		1,646	59.5	+13.0
Turnout		2,765	30.6	−25.7
Labour hold		Swing	+5.9	
