= 2015 Wigan Metropolitan Borough Council election =

2015 local election in England

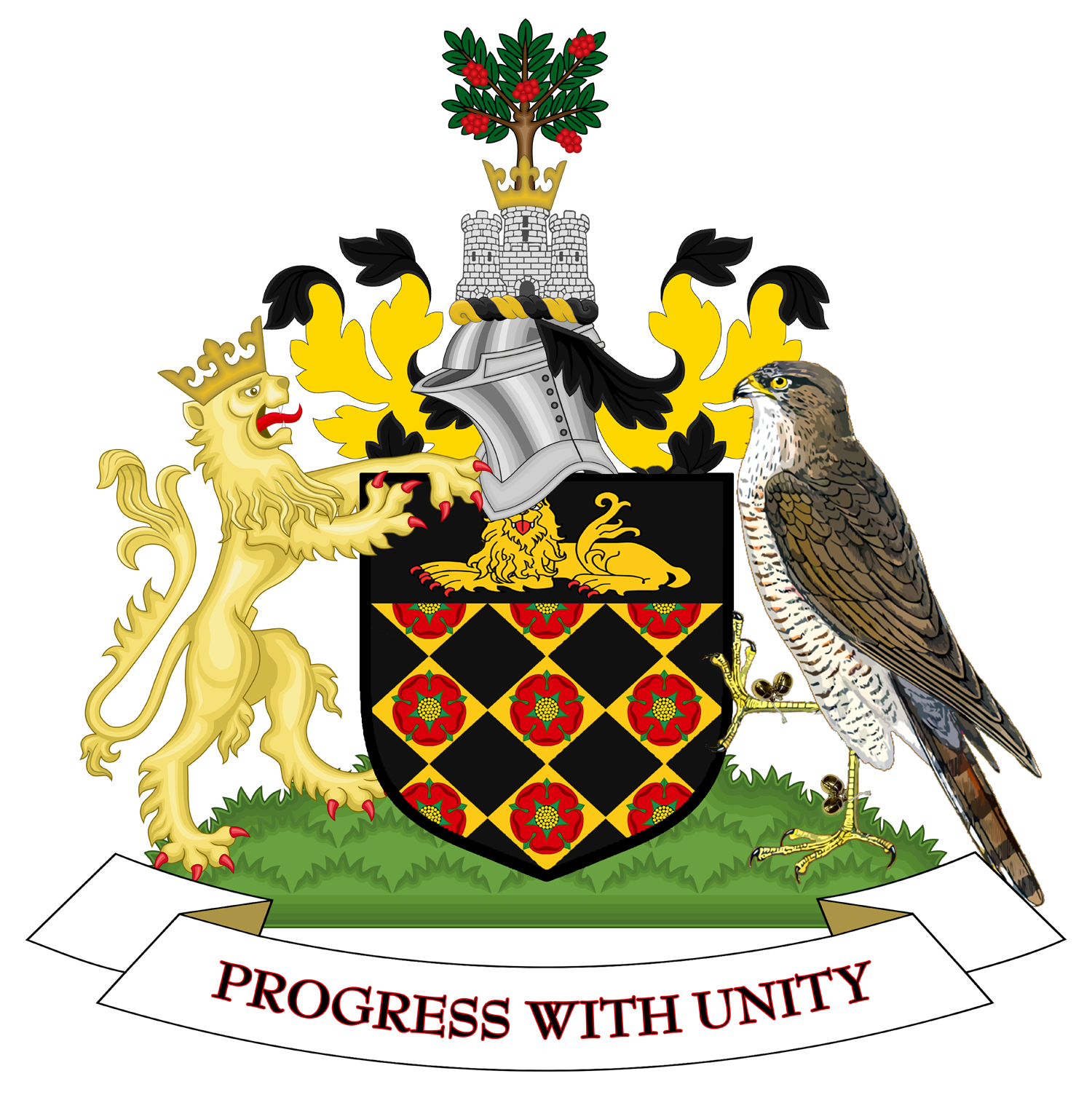
| ← 2014 | 7 May 2015 | 2016 → |

25 of 75 seats to Wigan Metropolitan Borough Council 38 seats needed for a majority
| | First party | Second party |
|---|---|---|
| Leader | Peter Smith | James Grundy |
| Party | Labour | Conservative |
| Leader since | 1991 | 2012 |
| Leader's seat | Leigh West | Lowton East |
| Seats before | 63 | 2 |
| Seats after | 64 | 3 |
| Seat change | ▲1 | ▲1 |
- 2015 local election results in Wigan. Conservative Labour Independent

The 2015 Wigan Metropolitan Borough Council election took place on 7 May 2015 to elect members of Wigan Metropolitan Borough Council in England. This was on the same day as other local elections and the general election.

== Overview ==
Prior to the election, the composition of the council was:

- Labour Party: 63
- Conservative Party: 2
- Independent: 10

After the election, the composition of the council was:

- Labour Party: 64
- Conservative Party: 3
- Independent: 8

Number of Candidates fielded per party
| Party | Number |
|---|---|
| Labour Party (UK) | 25 |
| Conservative Party (UK) | 25 |
| UK Independence Party | 24 |
| Green Party of England and Wales | 9 |
| Independent | 8 |
| Left Unity | 8 |
| Community Action Party | 3 |
| Liberal Democrats (UK) | 2 |
| TUSC | 1 |

== Results summary ==
2015 Wigan Metropolitan Borough Council election
| Party | This election | | | Full council | | | This election | | |
| Party | Seats | Net | Seats % | Other | Total | Total % | Votes | Votes % | +/− |
|---|---|---|---|---|---|---|---|---|---|
| Labour | 23 | ▲1 | 92 | 41 | 64 | 85.3 | 71,184 | 50.4 | ▼4.1 |
| Conservative | 1 | ▲1 | 4 | 2 | 3 | 4 | 27,263 | 19.3 | ▼0.3 |
| Independent | 1 | ▼2 | 4 | 7 | 8 | 10.7 | 7,483 | 5.3 | ▼7.3 |
| UKIP | 0 | Steady | 0 | 0 | 0 | 0 | 29,622 | 21.0 | ▲20.4 |
| Green | 0 | Steady | 0 | 0 | 0 | 0 | 2,837 | 2.0 | New |
| Community Action | 0 | Steady | 0 | 0 | 0 | 0 | 1,115 | 0.8 | ▼4.0 |
| Left Unity | 0 | Steady | 0 | 0 | 0 | 0 | 990 | 0.7 | New |
| Liberal Democrats | 0 | Steady | 0 | 0 | 0 | 0 | 648 | 0.5 | ▼2.2 |
| TUSC | 0 | Steady | 0 | 0 | 0 | 0 | 99 | 0.1 | ▼0.3 |

== Ward results ==
=== Bolton West constituency ===
==== Atherton ward ====
Local Elections 2015: Atherton
| Party | Candidate | Votes | % | ±% |
|---|---|---|---|---|
| Labour | Martin Luke Aldred | 2,508 | 39.9 | |
| Independent | Norman Alec Bradbury | 1,989 | 31.7 | |
| UKIP | Quinton John Smith | 950 | 15.1 | |
| Conservative | Toby Joseph Hewitt | 788 | 12.5 | |
| Left Unity | Craig Anthony Wilson | 46 | 0.7 | |
| Majority | | 519 | 8.2 | |
| Turnout | | 6,281 | | |
| Labour gain from Independent | | Swing | | |

=== Leigh constituency ===
==== Astley Mosley Common ward ====
Local Elections 2015: Astley Mosley Common
| Party | Candidate | Votes | % | ±% |
|---|---|---|---|---|
| Labour | Christine Lilian Roberts | 2,478 | 42.2 | |
| Conservative | David John Stirzaker | 1,804 | 30.7 | |
| UKIP | Joanne Bradley | 1,306 | 22.2 | |
| Green | Clive James Robert Charles | 290 | 4.9 | |
| Majority | | 674 | 11.5 | |
| Turnout | | 5,878 | | |
| Labour hold | | Swing | | |

==== Atherleigh ward ====
Local Elections 2015: Atherleigh
| Party | Candidate | Votes | % | ±% |
|---|---|---|---|---|
| Labour | Mark Aldred | 2,310 | 48.2 | |
| UKIP | Les Leggett | 1,005 | 21.0 | |
| Conservative | Paul Lambert Fairhurst | 859 | 17.9 | |
| Independent | Stuart Andrew Gerrard | 494 | 10.3 | |
| Left Unity | Stephen Michael Hall | 125 | 2.6 | |
| Majority | | 1,305 | 27.2 | |
| Turnout | | 4,793 | | |
| Labour hold | | Swing | | |

==== Golborne and Lowton West ward ====
Local Elections 2015: Golborne and Lowton West
| Party | Candidate | Votes | % | ±% |
|---|---|---|---|---|
| Labour | Stuart Arthur Keane | 3,046 | 60.5 | |
| UKIP | Peter Graham Kearns | 970 | 19.3 | |
| Conservative | Brian Howard Lobell | 793 | 15.8 | |
| Community Action | Sophie Aspey | 225 | 4.5 | |
| Majority | | 2,076 | 41.2 | |
| Turnout | | 5,034 | | |
| Labour hold | | Swing | | |

==== Leigh East ward ====
Local Elections 2015: Leigh East
| Party | Candidate | Votes | % | ±% |
|---|---|---|---|---|
| Labour | Anita Thorpe | 2,949 | 58.4 | |
| UKIP | Gill Gibson | 1,088 | 21.6 | |
| Conservative | Richard Byrom Houlton | 888 | 17.6 | |
| Left Unity | Graham Gifford | 123 | 2.4 | |
| Majority | | 1,861 | 36.8 | |
| Turnout | | 5,048 | | |
| Labour hold | | Swing | | |

==== Leigh South ward ====
Local Elections 2015: Leigh South
| Party | Candidate | Votes | % | ±% |
|---|---|---|---|---|
| Labour | John David O'Brien | 3,200 | 51.3 | |
| UKIP | Rod Halliwell | 1,547 | 24.8 | |
| Conservative | Denise Young | 1,358 | 21.8 | |
| Left Unity | Ian Heyes | 135 | 2.2 | |
| Majority | | 1,653 | 26.5 | |
| Turnout | | 6,240 | | |
| Labour hold | | Swing | | |

==== Leigh West ward ====
Local Elections 2015: Leigh West
| Party | Candidate | Votes | % | ±% |
|---|---|---|---|---|
| Labour | Myra Joan Whiteside | 3,066 | 56.7 | |
| UKIP | Mary Therese Lavelle | 1,418 | 26.2 | |
| Conservative | Andrew John Oxley | 645 | 11.9 | |
| Green | Paula Unger | 278 | 5.1 | |
| Majority | | 1,648 | 30.5 | |
| Turnout | | 5,407 | | |
| Labour hold | | Swing | | |

==== Lowton East ward ====
Local Elections 2015: Lowton East
| Party | Candidate | Votes | % | ±% |
|---|---|---|---|---|
| Conservative | Kath Houlton | 3,228 | 50.3 | |
| Labour | Pam Gilligan | 2,579 | 40.2 | |
| Independent | Sandy Franzen | 609 | 9.5 | |
| Majority | | 649 | 10.1 | |
| Turnout | | 6,416 | | |
| Conservative gain from Labour | | Swing | | |

==== Tyldesley ward ====
Local Elections 2015: Tyldesley
| Party | Candidate | Votes | % | ±% |
|---|---|---|---|---|
| Labour | Stephen John Hellier | 2,780 | 45.2 | |
| UKIP | Matthew Robert James | 1,530 | 24.9 | |
| Conservative | Sue Vickery | 1,198 | 19.5 | |
| Liberal Democrats | Lorraine Gillon | 353 | 5.7 | |
| Green | Graham Unsworth | 283 | 4.6 | |
| Majority | | 1,250 | 20.3 | |
| Turnout | | 6,144 | | |
| Labour hold | | Swing | | |

=== Makerfield constituency ===
==== Abram ward ====
Local Elections 2015: Abram
| Party | Candidate | Votes | % | ±% |
|---|---|---|---|---|
| Labour | Eunice Smethurst | 3,217 | 59.0 | |
| UKIP | Jim Carmichael-Prince | 1,584 | 28.4 | |
| Conservative | Joanne Bradley | 653 | 12.0 | |
| Majority | | 1,633 | 30.6 | |
| Turnout | | 5,454 | | |
| Labour hold | | Swing | | |

==== Ashton ward ====
Local Elections 2015: Ashton
| Party | Candidate | Votes | % | ±% |
|---|---|---|---|---|
| Labour | Jennifer Bullen | 2,738 | 49.0 | |
| UKIP | Alan Freeman | 950 | 17.0 | |
| Conservative | Marie Winstanley | 833 | 14.9 | |
| Community Action | Michael Moulding | 749 | 13.4 | |
| Independent | Peter Merry | 318 | 5.7 | |
| Majority | | 1,788 | 32.0 | |
| Turnout | | 5,588 | | |
| Labour hold | | Swing | | |

==== Bryn ward ====
Local Elections 2015: Bryn
| Party | Candidate | Votes | % | ±% |
|---|---|---|---|---|
| Labour | Nathan George Murray | 2,245 | 39.4 | |
| Independent | Gary Thomas Wilkes | 1,717 | 30.1 | |
| UKIP | Stephen Jones | 948 | 16.6 | |
| Conservative | Judith Anderson | 378 | 6.6 | |
| Independent | David Wilkes | 267 | 4.7 | |
| Community Action | Catherine Aspey | 141 | 2.5 | |
| Majority | | 528 | 9.2 | |
| Turnout | | 5,696 | | |
| Labour gain from Independent | | Swing | | |

==== Hindley ward ====
Local Elections 2015: Hindley
| Party | Candidate | Votes | % | ±% |
|---|---|---|---|---|
| Labour | James Eccles-Churton | 2,975 | 54.7 | |
| UKIP | Sue Ellis | 1,457 | 26.8 | |
| Conservative | Susan Atherton | 712 | 13.1 | |
| Liberal Democrats | John Charles Skipworth | 295 | 5.4 | |
| Majority | | 1,518 | 27.9 | |
| Turnout | | 5,439 | | |
| Labour hold | | Swing | | |

==== Hindley Green ward ====
Local Elections 2015: Hindley Green
| Party | Candidate | Votes | % | ±% |
|---|---|---|---|---|
| Labour | Frank Carmichael | 2,839 | 55.2 | |
| UKIP | Sandra Margaret Atherton | 1,520 | 29.5 | |
| Conservative | Gerard Joseph Houlton | 788 | 15.3 | |
| Majority | | 1,319 | 25.7 | |
| Turnout | | 5,147 | | |
| Labour gain from Independent | | Swing | | |

==== Orrell ward ====
Local Elections 2015: Orrell
| Party | Candidate | Votes | % | ±% |
|---|---|---|---|---|
| Labour | Steve Murphy | 2,812 | 44.3 | |
| Conservative | Michael William Winstanley | 2,257 | 35.5 | |
| UKIP | Philip Easton | 950 | 15.0 | |
| Green | David Stazicker | 325 | 5.1 | |
| Majority | | 545 | 8.8 | |
| Turnout | | 6,354 | | |
| Labour hold | | Swing | | |

==== Winstanley ward ====
Local Elections 2015: Winstanley
| Party | Candidate | Votes | % | ±% |
|---|---|---|---|---|
| Labour | Marie Teresa Morgan | 2,898 | 49.0 | |
| UKIP | Andrew Francis Collinson | 1,437 | 24.3 | |
| Conservative | Allan Atherton | 1,182 | 20.0 | |
| Green | Steven Charles Heyes | 398 | 6.7 | |
| Majority | | 1,461 | 24.7 | |
| Turnout | | 5,915 | | |
| Labour hold | | Swing | | |

==== Worsley Mesnes ward ====
Local Elections 2015: Worsley Mesnes
| Party | Candidate | Votes | % | ±% |
|---|---|---|---|---|
| Labour | Billy Rotherham | 3,039 | 59.4 | |
| UKIP | Maureen McCoy | 1,332 | 26.0 | |
| Conservative | Stephen Gerard Holt | 566 | 11.1 | |
| Green | Norma Stout | 182 | 3.6 | |
| Majority | | 1,707 | 33.4 | |
| Turnout | | 5,119 | | |
| Labour hold | | Swing | | |

=== Wigan constituency ===
==== Aspull, New Springs and Whelley ward ====
Local Elections 2015: Aspull, New Springs and Whelley
| Party | Candidate | Votes | % | ±% |
|---|---|---|---|---|
| Labour | Chris Ready | 3,534 | 55.3 | |
| UKIP | Mark Andrew Bradley | 1,416 | 22.2 | |
| Conservative | Jane Surples | 1,282 | 20.1 | |
| Left Unity | John Stuart Bolton | 156 | 2.4 | |
| Majority | | 2,118 | 33.2 | |
| Turnout | | 6,388 | 63.3 | |
| Labour hold | | Swing | | |

==== Douglas ward ====
Local Elections 2015: Douglas
| Party | Candidate | Votes | % | ±% |
|---|---|---|---|---|
| Labour | Michael Anthony Dewhurst | 3,145 | 64.2 | |
| UKIP | Derek Wilkes | 1,130 | 23.1 | |
| Conservative | Margaret Atherton | 525 | 10.7 | |
| Left Unity | Adele Joanne Andrews | 98 | 2.0 | |
| Majority | | 2,015 | 41.1 | |
| Turnout | | 4,898 | 50.2 | |
| Labour hold | | Swing | | |

==== Ince ward ====
Local Elections 2015: Ince
| Party | Candidate | Votes | % | ±% |
|---|---|---|---|---|
| Labour | Janice Sharratt | 2,937 | 64.1 | |
| UKIP | Ross Allan Wright | 1,192 | 26.0 | |
| Conservative | Callum Chadwick | 352 | 7.7 | |
| Left Unity | Janet Elizabeth Phillips | 100 | 2.2 | |
| Majority | | 1,745 | 38.1 | |
| Turnout | | 4,581 | 50.6 | |
| Labour hold | | Swing | | |

==== Pemberton ward ====
Local Elections 2015: Pemberton
| Party | Candidate | Votes | % | ±% |
|---|---|---|---|---|
| Labour | Sam Marc Murphy | 3,154 | 62.9 | |
| UKIP | Daniel Stephen Wood | 1,099 | 21.9 | |
| Conservative | Claire Houlton | 547 | 10.9 | |
| Green | Will Patterson | 212 | 4.2 | |
| Majority | | 2,055 | 41.0 | |
| Turnout | | 5,012 | 50.6 | |
| Labour hold | | Swing | | |

==== Shevington with Lower Ground ward ====
Local Elections 2015: Shevington with Lower Ground
| Party | Candidate | Votes | % | ±% |
|---|---|---|---|---|
| Labour | Paul Anthony Collins | 2,717 | 43.5 | |
| Conservative | David Ollerton | 1,661 | 26.6 | |
| UKIP | Arnold Jefferson Foster | 1,439 | 23.1 | |
| Green | Joseph Rylance | 426 | 6.8 | |
| Majority | | 1,056 | 16.9 | |
| Turnout | | 6,243 | 67.5 | |
| Labour hold | | Swing | | |

==== Standish with Langtree ward ====
Local Elections 2015: Standish with Langtree
| Party | Candidate | Votes | % | ±% |
|---|---|---|---|---|
| Standish Independents | George Allan Fairhurst | 1,999 | 30.3 | |
| Conservative | Ray Whittingham | 1,848 | 28.0 | |
| Labour | Debbie Parkinson | 1,735 | 26.3 | |
| UKIP | Emma Josephine Appleton | 923 | 14.0 | |
| TUSC | Sharon Holden | 99 | 1.4 | |
| Majority | | 151 | 2.3 | |
| Turnout | | 6,604 | 68.0 | |
| Standish Independents hold | | Swing | | |

==== Wigan Central ward ====
Local Elections 2015: Wigan Central
| Party | Candidate | Votes | % | ±% |
|---|---|---|---|---|
| Labour | Michael McLoughlin | 2,783 | 46.9 | |
| Conservative | Jean Margaret Peet | 1,391 | 23.4 | |
| UKIP | Keith Robert Jones | 1,228 | 20.7 | |
| Green | Damien Hendry | 443 | 7.5 | |
| Independent | Brian Parr | 90 | 1.5 | |
| Majority | | 1,392 | 23.5 | |
| Turnout | | 5,935 | 63.8 | |
| Labour hold | | Swing | | |

==== Wigan West ward ====
Local Elections 2015: Wigan West
| Party | Candidate | Votes | % | ±% |
|---|---|---|---|---|
| Labour | Steve Dawber | 3,500 | 62.1 | |
| UKIP | Janet Markland | 1,203 | 21.3 | |
| Conservative | Jamie Vickery | 727 | 12.9 | |
| Left Unity | Hazel Elizabeth Duffy | 207 | 3.7 | |
| Majority | | 2,297 | 40.7 | |
| Turnout | | 5,637 | 57.5 | |
| Labour hold | | Swing | | |
