= 2026 Wigan Council election =

2026 English local government election

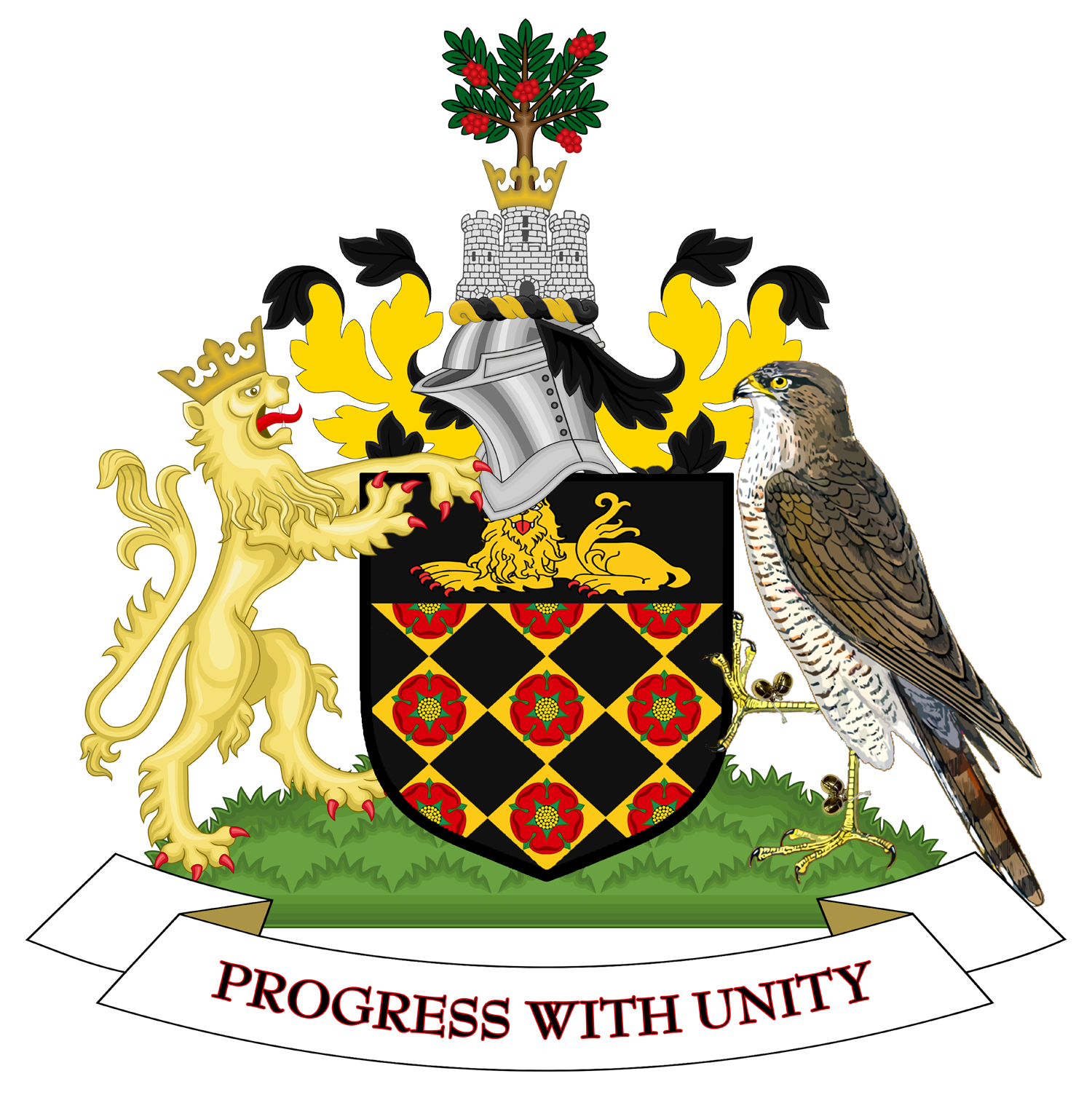
- 7 May 2026

25 out of 75 seats to Wigan Council 38 seats needed for a majority
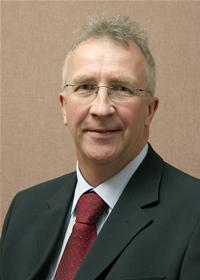
	First party	Second party	Third party
Leader	David Molyneux	Lee Moffitt
Party	Labour	Reform	Independent
Leader's seat	Ince (retiring)	Wigan Central
Last election	64 seats, 51.7%	0 seats, 3.2%	6 seats, 10.0%
Seats before	62	2	7
Seats won	0	24	0
Seats after	42	25	5
Seat change	▼20	▲23	▼2
Popular vote	23,760	43,777	3,288
Percentage	25.1%	46.2%	3.5%
Swing	▼26.6%	▲43.0%	▼6.5%
	Fourth party	Fifth party
Leader		Ray Whittingham
Party	Ind. Network	Conservative
Leader's seat		Standish with Langtree (retiring)
Last election	4 seats, 7.6%	1 seat, 15.1%
Seats before	3	1
Seats won	1	0
Seats after	3	0
Seat change	Steady	▼1
Popular vote	2,850	7,862
Percentage	3.0%	8.3%
Swing	▼4.5%	▼6.8%
- Winner of each seat at the 2026 Wigan Council election.
Leader before election
David Molyneux
Labour
Leader after election
Nazia Rehman
Labour

The 2026 Wigan Council election took place on 7 May 2026 to elect one third of the members of Wigan Council in England. The election was held on the same day as other local elections.

Reform UK won 24 out of 25 seats up for election and won the most votes across the borough. The incumbent Labour Party suffered heavy losses and won no seats at this election, but retained their majority by virtue of the number of seats they held in the two thirds of the council that was not up for election. The Labour leader before the election, David Molyneux, did not stand for re-election in 2026. Labour chose Nazia Rehman as its new group leader after the election, and she was formally appointed as the new leader of the council at the subsequent annual council meeting on 27 May 2026.

== Council composition ==
After 2024 election		Before 2026 election	
Party	Seats	Party	Seats
Labour	64	Labour	62
Ind. Network	4 (Note: Sit as part of the Community Independent Alliance group.)	Ind. Network	3
Reform	0	Reform	2
Conservative	1	Conservative	1
Independent	6 (Note: Bob Brierley, Steve Jones, Scarlett Myler, and Sylvia Wilkinson sit as part of the Independents Together group. Maureen O'Bern and Tony Whyte sit as part of the Community Independent Alliance group. Pat Draper is not part of a grouping.)	Independent	7

Changes 2024–2026:

- May 2024: John O'Brien (Labour) resigns – by-election held July 2024
- July 2024: Barbara Caren (Labour) wins by-election
- February 2025: Patricia Draper (Labour) leaves party to sit as an independent
- July 2025: George Davies (Labour) dies – by-election held October 2025
- October 2025: Lee Moffitt (Reform) gains by-election from Labour
- November 2025: Paul Watson (Independent Network) joins Reform

== Background ==
Wigan Metropolitan Borough Council was created in 1974. Labour have formed majority administrations for the entirety of its existence. The Conservatives formed the principal opposition until 1982, when they were overtaken by the SDP–Liberal Alliance. From 2003 to 2008 the Community Action Party were the second largest party, before being overtaken by the Conservatives. More recently, independents and the Independent Network have served as the principal opposition to Labour. Two independent groups exist; the Community Independent Alliance (consisting of the Independent Network and two independents) and Independents Together (consisting of four councillors elected as independents). The 2024 election saw Labour remain on 64 seats, losing one seat to an independent but gaining one from the Conservatives.

The 2023 election used a new set of ward boundaries. As such, this election was for the councillors elected with the second highest number of votes in 2023 for each of the 57 three-member wards. Labour was defending 20 seats, independents were defending 2, the Conservatives were defending 1, Reform UK was defending 1 and the Independent Network was defending 1.

== Summary ==
=== Election result ===
2026 Wigan Metropolitan Borough Council election
Party	This election				Full council			This election		
Party	Candidates	Seats	Net	Seats %	Other	Total	Total %	Votes	Votes %	+/−
Labour	{{{candidates}}}	0	▼20	0.0	42	42	56.0	23,760	25.1	–26.6
Reform	{{{candidates}}}	24	▲23	96.0	1	25	33.3	43,777	46.2	+43.0
Independent	{{{candidates}}}	0	▼2	0.0	5	5	6.7	3,288	3.5	–6.5
Ind. Network	{{{candidates}}}	1	Steady	4.0	2	3	4.0	2,850	3.0	–4.6
Green	{{{candidates}}}	0	Steady	0.0	0	0	0.0	10,602	11.2	+8.6
Conservative	{{{candidates}}}	0	▼1	0.0	0	0	0.0	7,862	8.3	–6.8
Liberal Democrats	{{{candidates}}}	0	Steady	0.0	0	0	0.0	2,679	2.8	±0.0
SDP	{{{candidates}}}	0	Steady	0.0	0	0	0.0	8	<0.1	N/A

== Incumbents ==
Ward	Incumbent councillor	Party	Re-standing
Abram	Eunice Smethurst	Labour	Yes
Ashton-in-Makerfield South	Jenny Bullen	Labour	No
Aspull, New Springs & Whelley	Ronald Conway	Labour	Yes
Astley	Paula Wakefield	Labour	No
Atherton North	Jamie Hodgkinson	Ind. Network	Yes
Atherton South & Lilford	Debra Wailes	Labour	No
Bryn with Ashton-in-Makerfield North	Sylvia Wilkinson	Independent	No
Douglas	Pat Draper	Independent	Yes
Golborne & Lowton West	Gena Merrett	Labour	Yes
Hindley	Jim Churton	Labour	Yes
Hindley Green	John Vickers	Labour	Yes
Ince	David Molyneux	Labour	No
Leigh Central & Higher Folds	Shelley Guest	Labour	No
Leigh South	Barbara Caren	Labour	Yes
Leigh West	Samantha Brown	Labour	Yes
Lowton East	Garry Lloyd	Labour	Yes
Orrell	Jim Nicholson	Labour	Yes
Pemberton	Paul Prescott	Labour	Yes
Shevington with Lower Ground & Moor	Michael Crosby	Labour	Yes
Standish with Langtree	Ray Wittingham	Conservative	No
Tydesley & Mosley Common	Jess Eastoe	Labour	Yes
Wigan Central	Lee Moffitt (Note: Elected at the 2025 Wigan Central by-election.)	Reform	Yes
Wigan West	David Wood	Labour	Yes
Winstanley	Marie Morgan	Labour	Yes
Worsley Mesnes	Helen O'Neill	Labour	Yes

== Ward results ==
Incumbent councillors standing for re-election are marked with an asterisk (*).

=== Abram ===
Abram
Party	Candidate	Votes	%	±%
Reform	David Bowker	1,958	56.1	N/A
Labour	Eunice Smethurst*	844	24.2	−32.1
Green	James Galloway	394	11.3	N/A
Conservative	Janet Walch	158	4.5	−3.4
Liberal Democrats	Graham Suddick	138	4.0	−0.7
Majority		1,114	31.9	N/A
Turnout		3,492	33.1	+10.2
Registered electors		~10,550		
Reform gain from Labour				

=== Ashton-in-Makerfield South ===
Ashton-in-Makerfield South
Party	Candidate	Votes	%	±%
Reform	Kathy Morrill-Ashford	1,572	46.4	N/A
Labour	Anca Condescu	1,100	32.5	−19.6
Green	Holly Abbott	432	12.7	N/A
Conservative	Paul Chapman	285	8.4	−2.4
Majority		472	13.9	N/A
Turnout		3,389	38.5	+10.9
Registered electors		~8,803		
Reform gain from Labour				

=== Aspull, New Springs & Whelley ===
Aspull, New Springs & Whelley
Party	Candidate	Votes	%	±%
Reform	Jo Meadows	2,050	49.6	N/A
Labour	Ron Conway*	1,348	32.6	−32.3
Green	Peter Kitts	399	9.6	−5.6
Conservative	Luke Marsden	203	4.9	−15.0
Liberal Democrats	Donald MacNamara	135	3.3	N/A
Majority		702	17.0	N/A
Turnout		4,135	44.3	+16.4
Registered electors		~9,334		
Reform gain from Labour				

=== Astley ===
Astley
Party	Candidate	Votes	%	±%
Reform	Eileen Strathearn	2,100	45.2	N/A
Labour	Adam Hollis	942	20.3	−32.3
Ind. Network	Sandra Robinson	703	15.1	−10.2
Green	Simeon Rowlands	504	10.9	N/A
Conservative	David Stirzaker	392	8.4	−13.7
Majority		1,158	25.0	N/A
Turnout		4,641	43.3	+13.8
Registered electors		~10,718		
Reform gain from Labour				

=== Atherton North ===
Atherton North
Party	Candidate	Votes	%	±%
Ind. Network	Jamie Hodgkinson*	1,635	47.5	+8.8
Reform	Nigel Taylor (Note: Suspended as a Reform UK candidate.)	1,010	29.3	N/A
Labour	Paul Blinkhorn	407	11.8	−25.6
Green	Ellie Kemp	270	7.8	N/A
Conservative	Marie Cooper	121	3.5	−1.1
Majority		625	18.2	+16.9
Turnout		3,442	33.7	+7.1
Registered electors		~10,214		
Ind. Network hold				

=== Atherton South & Lilford ===
Atherton South & Lilford
Party	Candidate	Votes	%	±%
Reform	Martin Farrimond	2,027	50.9	N/A
Labour	Richard Phelan	868	21.8	−26.5
Independent	Michael Livesey	457	11.5	N/A
Green	Cobi Hughes	398	10.0	N/A
Conservative	Ellis Rowlands	230	5.8	−6.7
Majority		1,159	29.1	N/A
Turnout		3,980	38.3	+11.6
Registered electors		~10,392		
Reform gain from Labour				

=== Bryn with Ashton-in-Makerfield North ===
Bryn with Ashton-in-Makerfield North
Party	Candidate	Votes	%	±%
Reform	Robert Kenyon	1,770	52.2	N/A
Labour	Louis Beckley	816	24.1	−10.1
Green	Thompson Michael	400	11.8	N/A
Conservative	Judith Atherton	229	6.8	+1.1
Liberal Democrats	Christopher Davies	177	5.2	N/A
Majority		954	28.1	N/A
Turnout		3,392	37.8	+10.4
Registered electors		~8,974		
Reform gain from Independent				

=== Douglas ===
Douglas
Party	Candidate	Votes	%	±%
Reform	Matthew Lambert	1,293	44.2	N/A
Labour	Alex Sharples	585	20.0	−49.7
Independent	Pat Draper*	515	17.6	N/A
Green	David Beddows	307	10.5	−4.9
Conservative	Margaret Atherton	124	4.2	−10.8
Liberal Democrats	John Burley	103	3.5	N/A
Majority		708	24.2	N/A
Turnout		2,927	30.7	+10.5
Registered electors		~9,534		
Reform gain from Independent				

=== Golborne & Lowton West ===
Golborne & Lowton West
Party	Candidate	Votes	%	±%
Reform	Susan Frame	1,478	43.2	N/A
Labour	Gena Merrett*	1,125	32.9	−30.5
Conservative	Edward Houlton	310	9.1	−6.5
Green	Kathryn Godfrey	281	8.2	N/A
Independent	Richard Scott	228	6.7	−10.2
Majority		353	10.3	N/A
Turnout		3,422	37.0	+11.6
Registered electors		~9,249		
Reform gain from Labour				

=== Hindley ===
Hindley
Party	Candidate	Votes	%	±%
Reform	Paul Manniex	1,832	52.3	+39.1
Labour	Jim Churton*	750	21.4	−21.0
Green	Matthew Baron	374	10.7	+6.6
Independent	Jordan Gaskell	282	8.1	−0.3
Conservative	Cyril Pendlebury	140	4.0	+0.3
Liberal Democrats	John Skipworth	125	3.6	+1.3
Majority		1,082	30.9	N/A
Turnout		3,503	35.3	+11.6
Registered electors		~9,924		
Reform gain from Labour		Swing	▲30.1	

=== Hindley Green ===
Hindley Green
Party	Candidate	Votes	%	±%
Reform	Liam Clarke	1,878	52.3	+36.8
Labour	John Vickers*	1,172	32.7	−17.0
Green	Nathanael Smith	258	7.2	N/A
Conservative	Marie Winstanley	174	4.8	−0.4
Liberal Democrats	Gary Skipworth	106	3.0	+0.9
Majority		706	19.6	N/A
Turnout		3,588	38.9	+12.5
Registered electors		~9,224		
Reform gain from Labour		Swing	▲26.9	

=== Ince ===
Ince
Party	Candidate	Votes	%	±%
Reform	Gemma Painter	1,809	58.3	N/A
Labour	Terence Halliwell	608	19.6	−24.9
Green	Gareth Nelson	365	11.8	N/A
Liberal Democrats	Vincent Holgate	135	4.3	N/A
Conservative	Yamini Gupta	115	3.7	−3.4
Independent	The Zok	73	2.4	+0.7
Majority		1,201	38.7	N/A
Turnout		3,105	32.9	+10.4
Registered electors		~9,438		
Reform gain from Labour				

=== Leigh Central & Higher Folds ===
Leigh Central & Higher Folds
Party	Candidate	Votes	%	±%
Reform	Tina Kennedy	1,696	48.3	N/A
Labour	Sarah Johnson	886	25.2	−27.0
Green	Ashley Trigg	527	15.0	+6.5
Conservative	Margaret Winstanley	216	6.2	−5.5
Independent	Hannah Sephton	185	5.3	N/A
Majority		810	23.1	N/A
Turnout		3,510	32.7	+11.1
Registered electors		~10,734		
Reform gain from Labour				

=== Leigh South ===
Leigh South
Party	Candidate	Votes	%	±%
Reform	Leon Peters	1,827	47.5	N/A
Labour	Barbara Caren*	968	25.1	−26.6
Green	Jonathon Hughes	333	8.7	+4.0
Conservative	Dominic Sutton	290	7.5	−9.9
Independent	Jayson Hargreaves	212	5.5	−14.0
Liberal Democrats	Christopher Noon	211	5.5	−1.2
SDP	Neil Gordon	8	0.2	N/A
Majority		859	22.4	N/A
Turnout		3,849	40.2	+11.9
Registered electors		~9,575		
Reform gain from Labour				

=== Leigh West ===
Leigh West
Party	Candidate	Votes	%	±%
Reform	David Evans	1,945	47.5	N/A
Labour	Samantha Brown*	958	25.1	−26.6
Green	Canaan Thomas	401	8.7	+4.0
Conservative	Gerard Houlton	251	7.5	−9.9
Liberal Democrats	Lorraine Gillon	200	5.5	−1.2
Majority		987	22.4	N/A
Turnout		3,755	33.6	+12.8
Registered electors		~11,176		
Reform gain from Labour				

=== Lowton East ===
Lowton East
Party	Candidate	Votes	%	±%
Reform	Simon Smith	1,817	35.8	N/A
Conservative	Kathleen Houlton	1,508	29.7	−16.1
Labour	Garry Lloyd*	1,238	24.4	−29.8
Green	Julie Shawcross	506	10.0	N/A
Majority		309	6.1	N/A
Turnout		5,069	44.8	+10.8
Registered electors		~11,315		
Reform gain from Labour				

=== Orrell ===
Orrell
Party	Candidate	Votes	%	±%
Reform	Paul Bannister	1,621	39.9	+26.1
Labour	Jim Nicholson*	983	24.2	−28.0
Conservative	Michael Winstanley	787	19.4	−10.6
Green	Julia Davenport	470	11.6	N/A
Liberal Democrats	Neil Stevenson	199	4.9	+0.9
Majority		638	15.7	N/A
Turnout		4,060	43.1	+11.7
Registered electors		~9,420		
Reform gain from Labour				

=== Pemberton ===
Pemberton
Party	Candidate	Votes	%	±%
Reform	Simon Silcock	1,623	54.2	N/A
Labour	Paul Prescott*	733	24.5	−35.0
Green	Olivia Farrimond	358	12.0	N/A
Conservative	Jean Peet	146	4.9	−3.7
Liberal Democrats	David Burley	133	4.4	−1.2
Majority		890	29.7	N/A
Turnout		2,993	31.1	+11.5
Registered electors		~9,624		
Reform gain from Labour				

=== Shevington with Lower Ground & Moor ===
Shevington with Lower Ground & Moor
Party	Candidate	Votes	%	±%
Reform	Lilian Rogers	1,916	43.1	N/A
Labour	Michael Crosby*	1,147	25.8	−25.6
Green	Caeryn Collins	633	14.2	N/A
Conservative	Marjorie Clayton	312	7.0	−9.2
Independent	Debbie Fairhurst	253	5.7	−16.5
Liberal Democrats	Brian Crombie-Fisher	186	4.2	−1.5
Majority		769	17.3	N/A
Turnout		4,447	45.2	+11.8
Registered electors		~9,838		
Reform gain from Labour				

=== Standish with Langtree ===
Standish with Langtree
Party	Candidate	Votes	%	±%
Reform	Michael Whalley	1,679	32.9	N/A
Labour	Margaret Gaffney	1,014	19.9	−23.1
Independent	Gareth Fairhurst	811	15.9	−18.7
Green	Hayley Pierce	757	14.8	N/A
Conservative	Neil Dunlop	732	14.4	−4.9
Liberal Democrats	Aimee Laverick	108	2.1	−1.0
Majority		665	13.0	N/A
Turnout		5,101	44.3	+12.7
Registered electors		~11,515		
Reform gain from Conservative				

=== Tydesley & Mosley Common ===
Tydesley & Mosley Common
Party	Candidate	Votes	%	±%
Reform	Adrian White	1,768	44.7	N/A
Labour	Jess Eastoe*	785	19.9	−17.2
Green	Paul Binns	560	14.2	N/A
Ind. Network	Anthony Waite	512	12.9	−39.5
Conservative	Susan Atherton	330	8.3	−2.2
Majority		981	24.8	N/A
Turnout		3,955	39.7	+13.6
Registered electors		~9,962		
Reform gain from Labour				

=== Wigan Central ===
Wigan Central
Party	Candidate	Votes	%	±%
Reform	Lee Moffitt*	1,771	44.1	N/A
Labour	Navas Beeravu	1,205	30.0	−18.2
Green	Jude Scrutton	516	12.9	+6.3
Conservative	Paul Martin	292	7.3	−7.2
Liberal Democrats	Andrew Holland	229	5.7	+2.2
Majority		566	14.1	N/A
Turnout		4,013	42.6	+12.7
Registered electors		~9,420		
Reform hold				

=== Wigan West ===
Wigan West
Party	Candidate	Votes	%	±%
Reform	Sam Ashton	1,746	47.3	N/A
Labour	Dave Wood*	1,037	28.1	−39.8
Green	Rosalind Hackett	527	14.3	N/A
Liberal Democrats	Stuart Thomas	210	5.7	−11.0
Conservative	Allan Atherton	173	4.7	−10.7
Majority		709	19.2	N/A
Turnout		3,693	37.2	+11.9
Registered electors		~9,927		
Reform gain from Labour				

=== Winstanley ===
Winstanley
Party	Candidate	Votes	%	±%
Reform	Paul Forbes	1,881	49.7	+29.9
Labour	Marie Morgan*	1,174	31.0	−26.0
Green	John Logan	312	8.2	+0.1
Conservative	William Parkinson	243	6.4	−3.7
Liberal Democrats	Robert Stevenson	176	4.6	−0.4
Majority		707	18.7	N/A
Turnout		3,786	42.4	+16.2
Registered electors		~8,929		
Reform gain from Labour				

=== Worsley Mesnes ===
Worsley Mesnes
Party	Candidate	Votes	%	±%
Reform	Keith Whalley	1,711	50.9	+27.3
Labour	Helen O'Neill*	847	25.2	−28.7
Green	Deborah Browne	320	9.5	N/A
Independent	Danny Cooke	272	8.1	−5.1
Liberal Democrats	Stuart Worthington	108	3.2	+0.6
Conservative	Ayodeji Odukoya	101	3.0	−3.8
Majority		864	25.7	N/A
Turnout		3,359	37.4	+13.0
Registered electors		~8,981		
Reform gain from Labour		Swing	▲28.0	

== Post-election changes ==
=== Hindley Green by-election ===
Hindley Green by-election: 12 November 2026
Party	Candidate	Votes	%	±%
Labour	John Vickers	1,201	49.5	▲16.8
Reform	Bonnie Clarke	887	36.6	▼15.8
Independent	Mark Prescott	124	5.1	N/A
Restore	Rebecca Shepherd	107	4.4	N/A
Conservative	Daniel Jackson	56	2.3	▼2.5
Green	Nat Smith	42	1.7	▼5.5
Liberal Democrats	David Burley	9	0.4	▼2.6
Majority		314	12.9	▼6.7
Turnout		2,426	26.3	▼12.6
Labour gain from Independent		Swing		
