= 2027 Wigan Metropolitan Borough Council election =

2027 English local government election

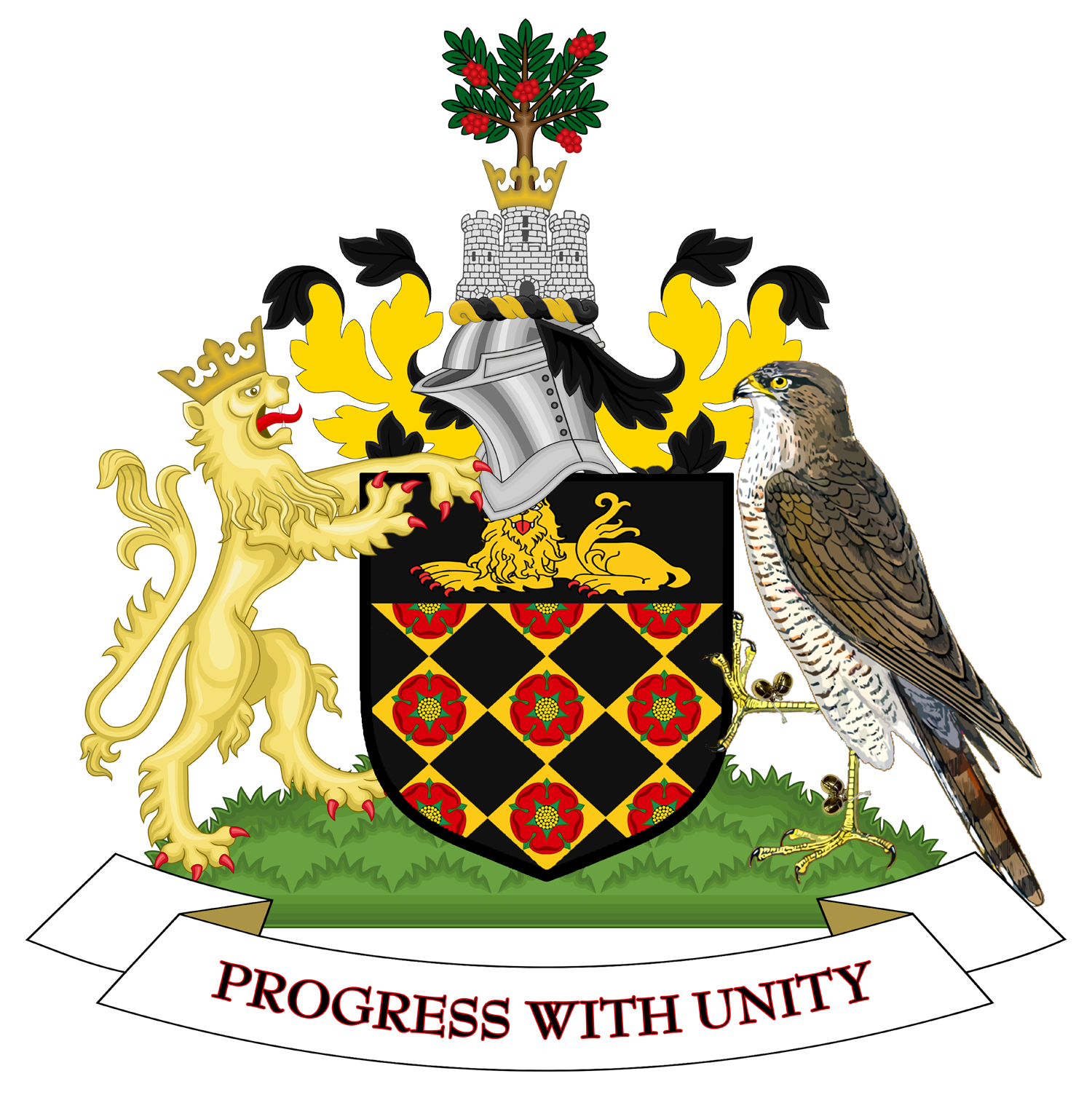
- 6 May 2027

25 out of 75 seats to Wigan Metropolitan Borough Council 38 seats needed for a majority
Leader	Nazia Rehman	Paul Watson	Stuart Gerrard
Party	Labour	Reform	Community Independent alliance
Leader's seat	Abram	Atherton North	Atherton North
Last election	42 seats,	24 seats,	8 seats
Current seats	43	25	7
Incumbent Leader
Nazia Rehman
Labour

The 2027 Wigan Metropolitan Borough Council election will take place on 6 May 2027 to elect one third of the members of Wigan Metropolitan Borough Council in England. The election will be held on the same day as other local elections.
