= Old Town Hall, Wigan =

Municipal building in Wigan, Greater Manchester, England

Old Town Hall
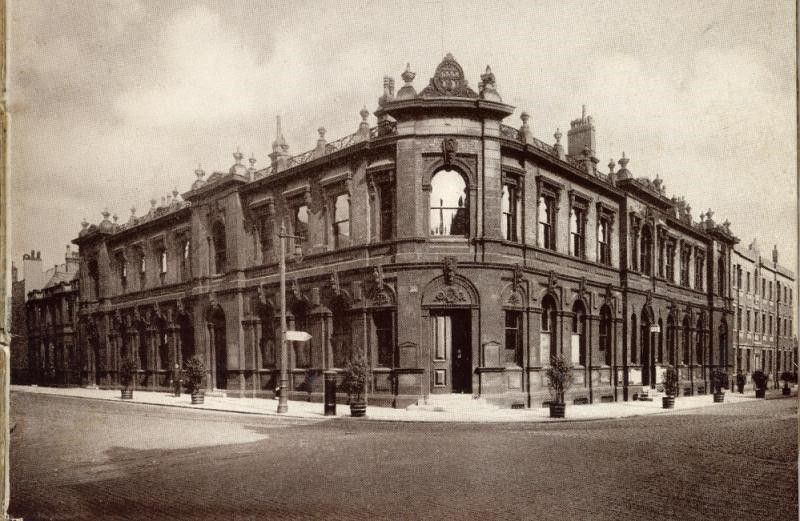
- Old Wigan Town Hall

- Shown in Greater Manchester
- 53.5440°N 2.6299°W
- Location: Wigan

History
- Built: 1867

Site notes
- Architect(s): Nuttall & Cook
- Architectural style: Italianate style

Listed Building – Grade II
- Designated: 12 November 1990
- Reference no.: 1384480

The Old Town Hall was a former municipal facility at the corner of King Street and Rodney Street in Wigan, England. The building, which was demolished in September 2013, had been designated a Grade II listed building in 1990.

== History ==
The first town hall in Wigan, located at the western side of the Market Place, was commissioned by the James Barry, 4th Earl of Barrymore and Sir Robert Bradshaigh, the town's representatives in parliament. It was designed in the neoclassical style with arcading on the ground floor to allow markets to be held and completed in 1720. The older building remained in use until its demolition in 1882.

The building now referred to as the "old town hall" was the second of three seats of local government in Wigan; it was built on a plot at the corner of King Street and Rodney Street in Wigan, between 1866 and 1867. Designed by local architects Nuttall & Cook, the two-storey Italianate style structure was built largely of brick in Flemish bond, except for its sandstone ashlar ground floor and some sandstone dressings; the roof was of slate. It cost £12,000 to build, the equivalent of about £1.48 million in 2024. (Note: United Kingdom Gross Domestic Product deflator figures follow the MeasuringWorth "consistent series" supplied in Thomas, Ryland; Williamson, Samuel H. (2026), "What Was the U.K. GDP Then?", MeasuringWorth) The design included large round-headed windows with pilasters between them on the ground floor and square-headed sashed windows with architraves on the first floor; there was a cast-iron parapet above that decorated with urns on pedestals. The new building was originally used as the borough courts until civic leaders move their offices into the building in 1882.

King George VI and Queen Elizabeth visited the town hall on 20 May 1938 just before the start of the Second World War. In order to meet the expanding accommodation needs of County Borough of Wigan, some departments moved into a new civic centre which was opened by the Leader of the council, Alderman Ernest Ball, on 22 April 1970.

The old town hall continued to be the headquarters of the council until the county borough was abolished by the Local Government Act 1972 in 1974. It then served as the headquarters of the Wigan Metropolitan Borough Council until 1990, when the council moved its staff to the new Town Hall, formerly the home of the Wigan Mining and Technical College.

The old Town Hall subsequently remained vacant, and fell into a state of disrepair. Part of the rear of the building was demolished, leaving the remainder insecure. A planning application to redevelop the site as office accommodation and 133 residential units was submitted in 2007. After this proposal did not proceed, the building was completely demolished in September 2013.

== See also ==
- Listed buildings in Wigan
