= Wigan Town Hall =

Municipal building in Wigan, Greater Manchester, England

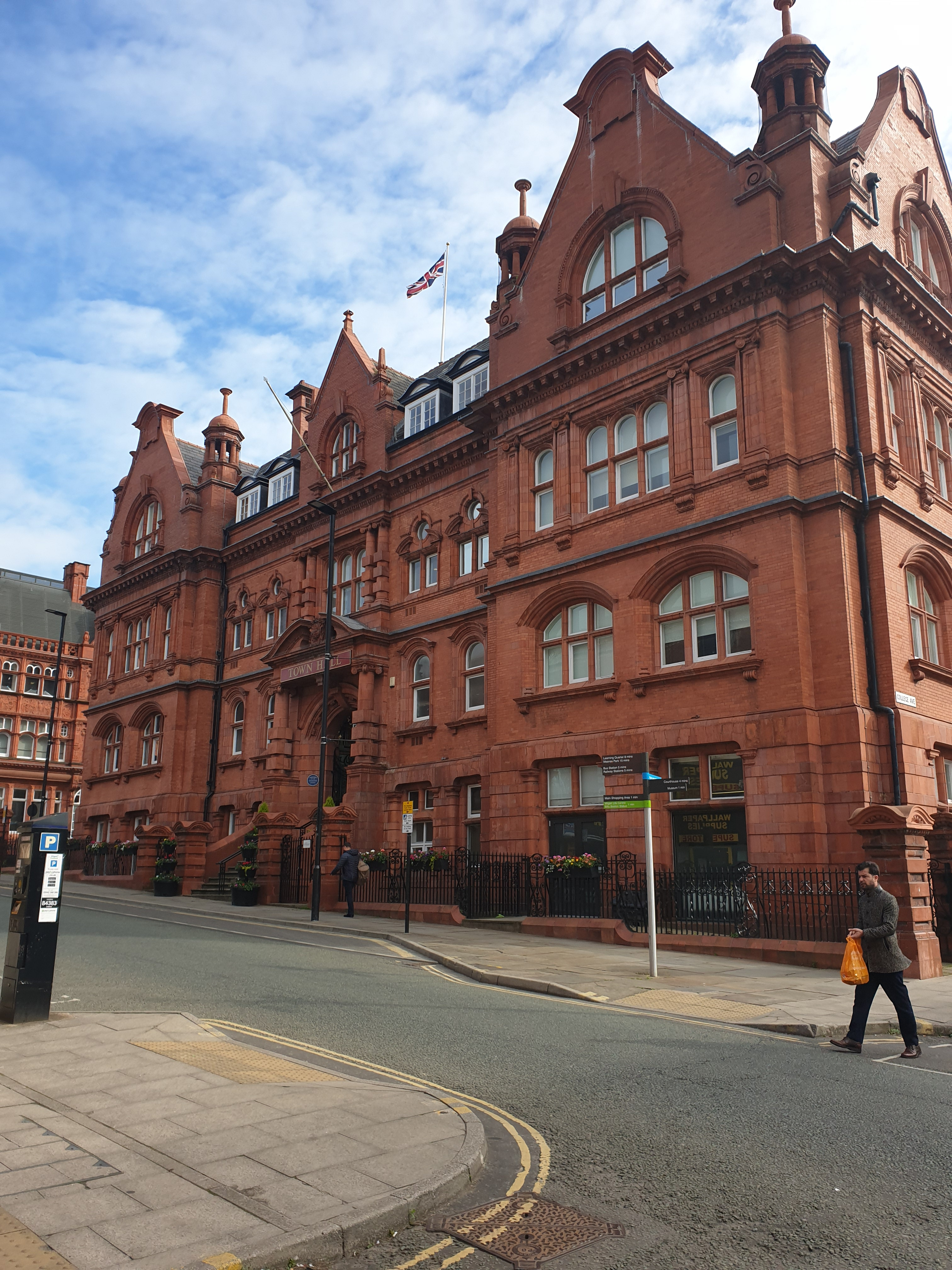
- Wigan Town Hall

- Shown in Greater Manchester
- 53.5451°N 2.6299°W
- Location: Wigan

History
- Built: 1903

Site notes
- Architect(s): Briggs and Wolstenholme
- Architectural style: Baroque style

Listed Building – Grade II
- Designated: 11 July 1983
- Reference no.: 1384483

The new Town Hall is a former technical college in Library Street, Wigan, England which was converted into a municipal facility in 1990. It is a Grade II listed building.

== History ==
The building, which was designed by Briggs and Wolstenholme in the Baroque style, was opened by the Countess of Crawford as the Wigan Mining and Technical College in 1903. The design included a porch with large Ionic order columns and frieze above with the words "Mining Technical College". (Note: In 1990 the words "Mining Technical College" were concealed by a sign with the words "Town Hall".) The design also included four turrets with cupolas at roof level. An extension was added in 1929. After expanding into new areas such as building and the arts, the college became known as Wigan College of Technology. The college needed larger premises to accommodate this expansion and secured new facilities in Walkden Avenue in 1990. This enabled the vacated building in Library Street to be converted into a municipal facility to replace the aging old Town Hall at the corner of King Street and Rodney Street. The newly-converted facility was officially opened as the new headquarters of the Wigan Metropolitan Borough Council by the Princess of Wales on 25 November 1991. She unveiled a commemorative plaque and then had lunch with civic leaders.

In late 2008, the red terracotta facade was carefully repaired to stop pieces from breaking away. Then, a more extensive restoration of the town hall, to a design by GT3 Architects and undertaken by ISG Construction at a cost of £7.2 million, was completed in 2016. The restoration work involved changes to the interior layout to create an open-plan environment: it also included removal of ceilings to reveal original cornices, conservation of the original flooring and repairs to decorative tiling. During the work the contractors discovered a hidden network of tunnels, thought to be part of a heating system, as well an ornate mosaic floor and an antique stained glass window.

Important works of art in the town hall include a painting by George Earl depicting Victorians departing by train from King's Cross Station on a journey to Scotland. One of the function rooms displays copies of ten Royal charters that the town has received since it was granted borough status in 1246.

== See also ==
- Listed buildings in Wigan
