= Golborne and Lowton West =

- Electoral ward
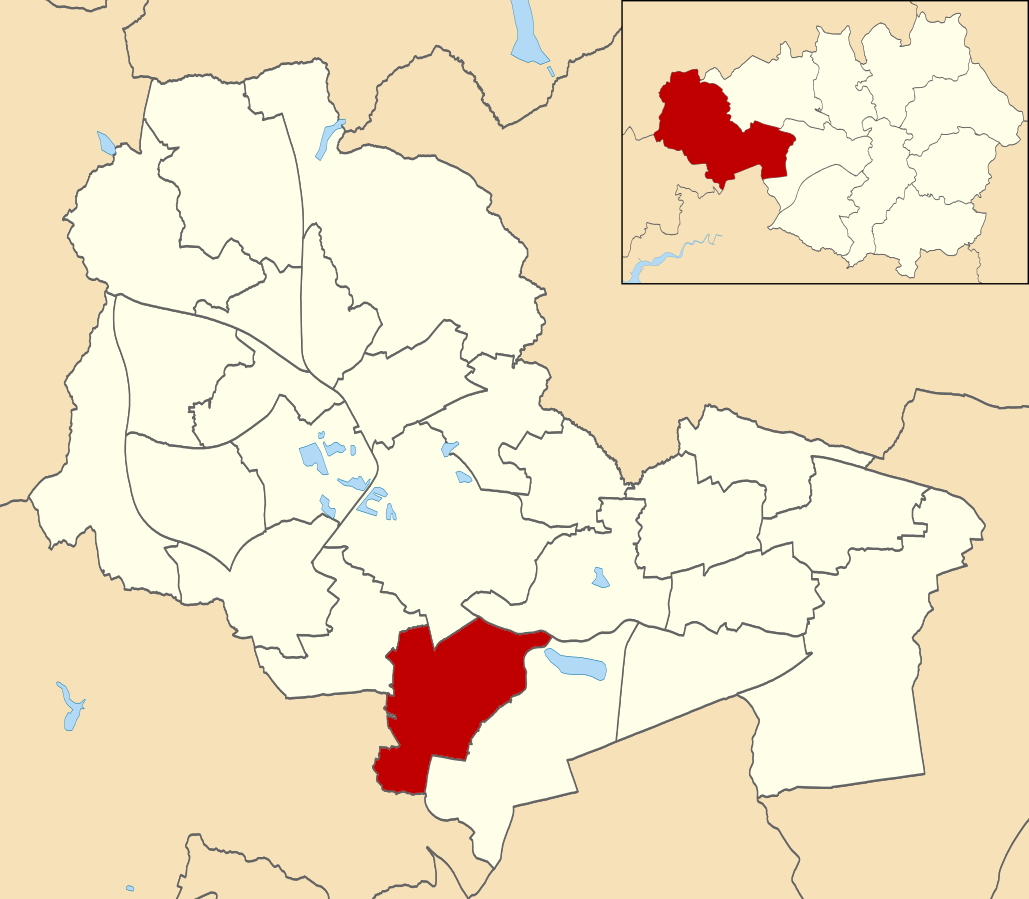
- Golborne and Lowton West ward within Wigan Metropolitan Borough Council

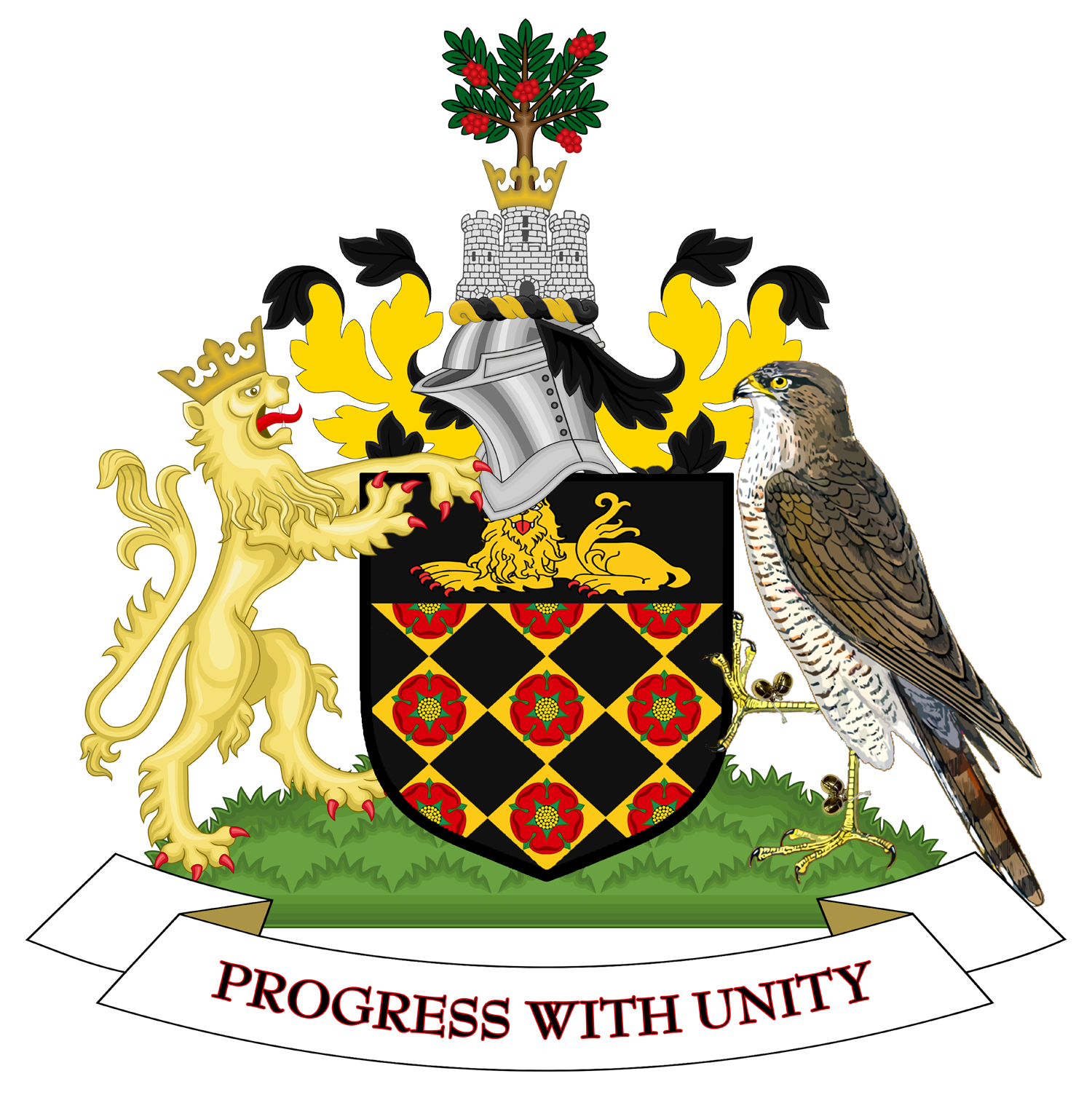
- Coat of arms
- Motto: Progress with Unity
- Interactive map of Golborne and Lowton West
- Coordinates: 53.4807°N 2.5920°W
- Country: United Kingdom
- Constituent country: England
- Region: North West England
- County: Greater Manchester
- Metropolitan borough: Wigan
- Created: May 2004
- Named after: Golborne and Lowton

Government
  - Type: Unicameral
  - Body: Wigan Metropolitan Borough Council
  - Mayor of Wigan: Sue Greensmith (Labour)
  - Councillor: Susan Gambles (Labour)
  - Councillor: Stuart Keane (Labour)
  - Councillor: Yvonne Klieve (Labour)

Population
  - Total: 11,965

Golborne and Lowton West is an electoral ward in Leigh, England. It forms part of Wigan Metropolitan Borough Council, as well as the parliamentary constituency of Leigh.

== Councillors ==
The ward is represented by three councillors: Susan Gambles (Lab), Stuart Keane (Lab), and Yvonne Klieve (Lab).
