= Worsley Mesnes (ward) =

- Electoral ward
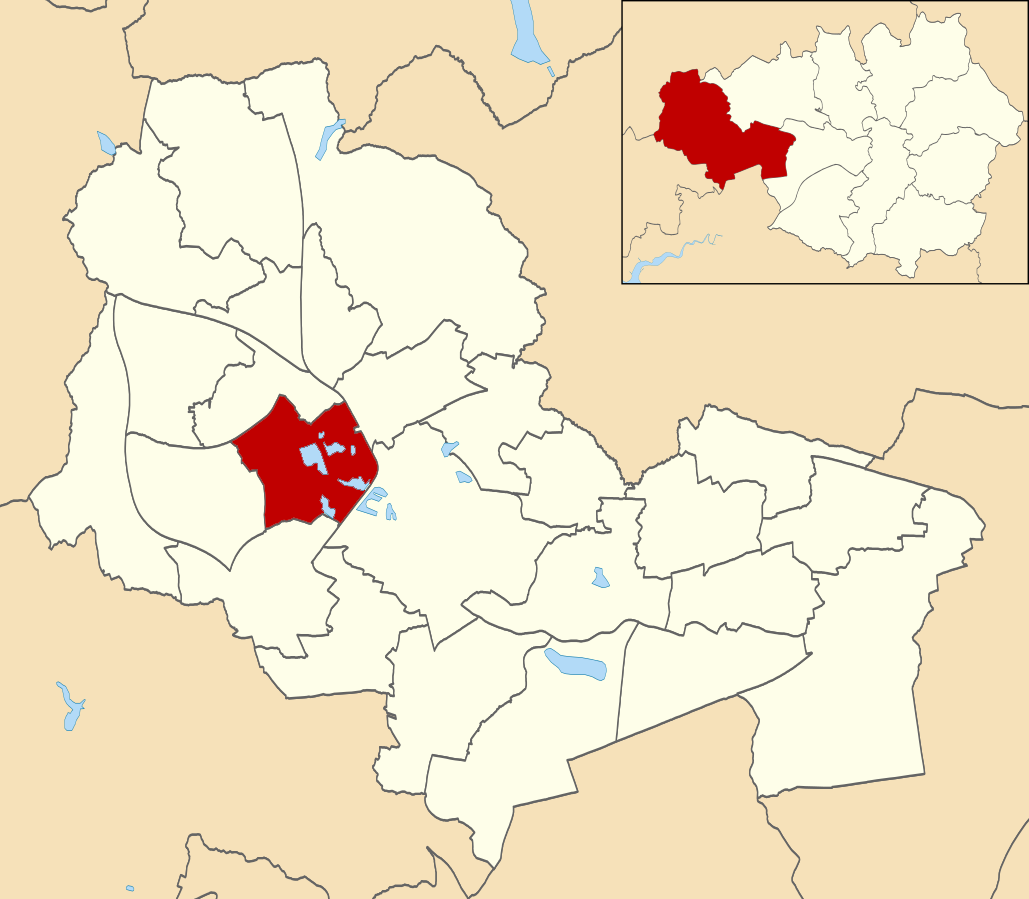
- Worsley Mesnes ward within Wigan Metropolitan Borough Council

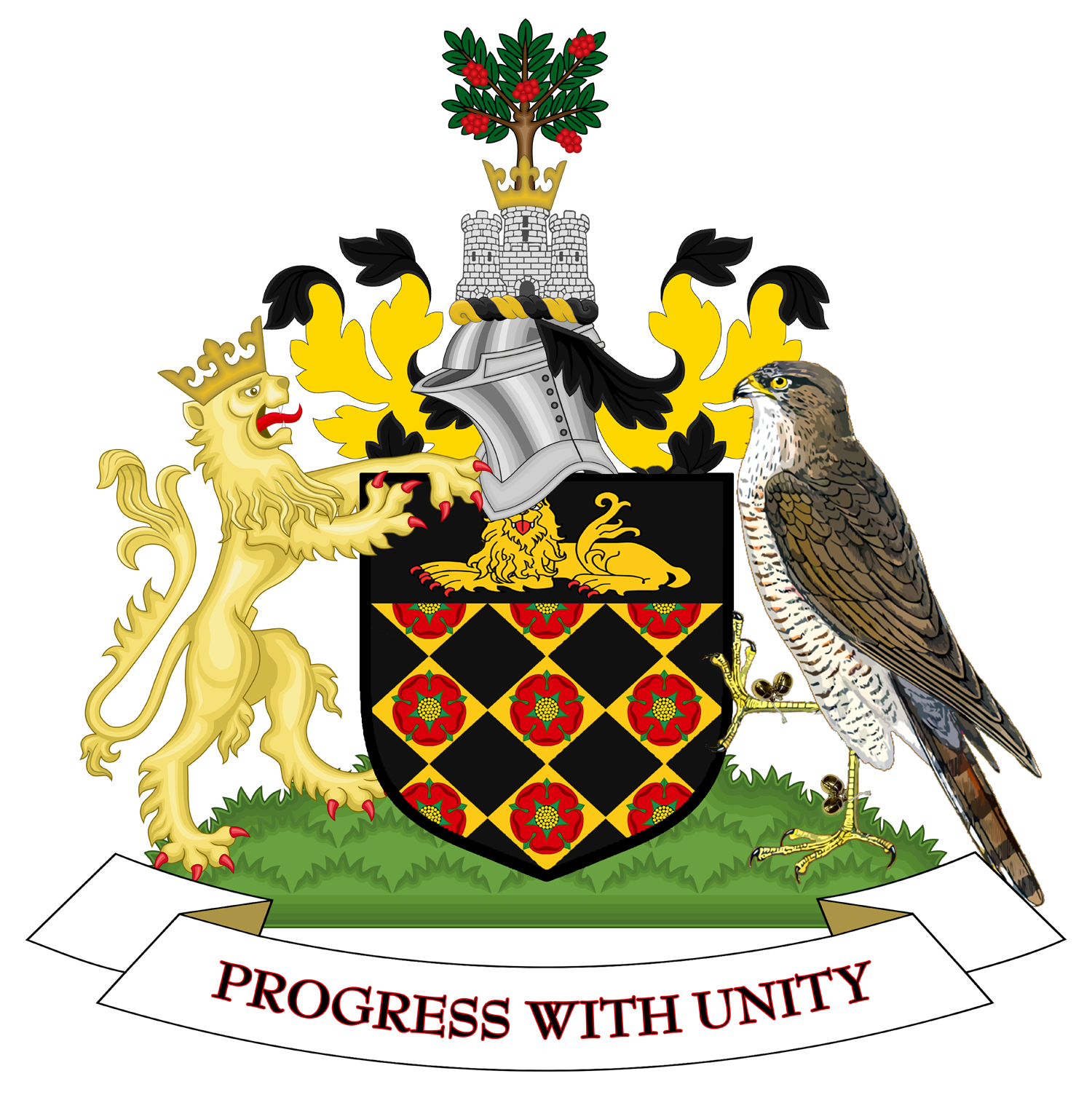
- Coat of arms
- Motto: Progress with Unity
- Country: United Kingdom
- Constituent country: England
- Region: North West England
- County: Greater Manchester
- Metropolitan borough: Wigan
- Created: May 2004
- Named for: Worsley Mesnes

Government
  - Type: Unicameral
  - Body: Wigan Metropolitan Borough Council
  - Mayor of Wigan: Sue Greensmith (Labour)
  - Councillor: Patricia Holland (Labour)
  - Councillor: David Hurst (Labour)
  - Councillor: William Rotherham (Labour)

Population
  - Total: 12,160

Worsley Mesnes is an electoral ward in Wigan, England. It forms part of Wigan Metropolitan Borough Council, as well as the parliamentary constituency of Makerfield.

== Councillors ==
The ward is represented by three councillors: Patricia Holland (Lab), David Hurst (Lab), and William Rotherham (Lab).
