= Wigan Council =

Local authority for Wigan, England

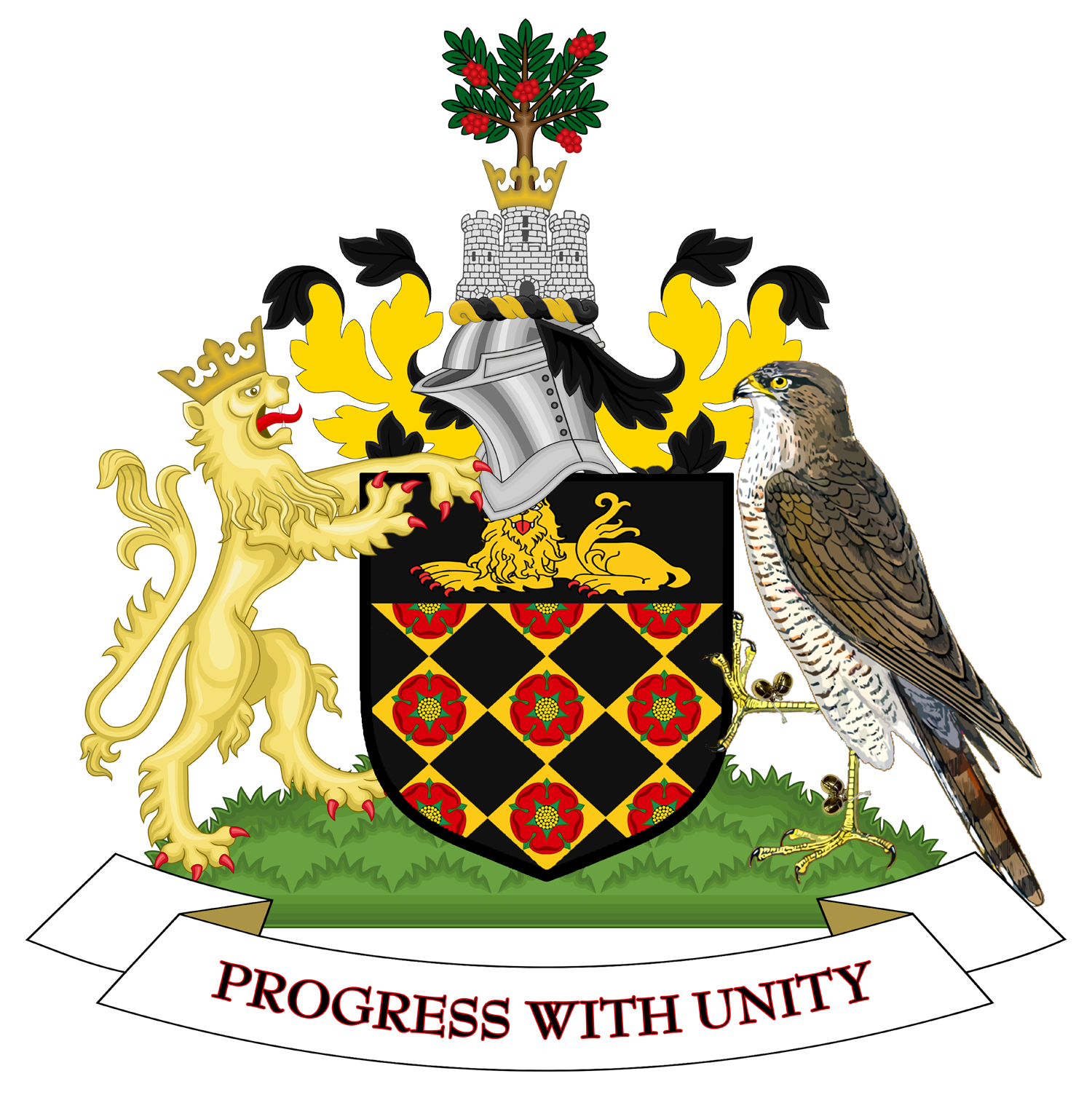
- Coat of arms

- Corporate logo

Type
- Type: Metropolitan borough council

Leadership
- Mayor: Anne Collins, Labour since 27 May 2026
- Leader: Nazia Rehman, Labour since 27 May 2026
- Chief Executive: Alison McKenzie-Folan since 2019

Structure
- Seats: 75 councillors
- Graph of the party split among 75 seats.
- Political groups: Administration (43) Labour (43) Other parties (32) Reform (25) Independent (7)
- Committees: List: Council; Cabinet; Audit, Governance and Standards Committee; Standards Ad Hoc Sub Committee; Licensing Committee; Licensing Sub; Planning Committee; Regulation Committee; Regulation Sub Committee; Fair Opportunities for All: Children and Young People Scrutiny Committee; Fair Opportunities for All: Health and Social Care Scrutiny Committee; Fair Opportunities for All: Place and Environment Scrutiny Committee; Progress with Unity Scrutiny Committee; Health and Wellbeing Board; Honorary Aldermen Nominations Committee; Housing Advisory Panel
- Joint committees: Greater Manchester Combined Authority; Greater Manchester Police, Fire and Crime Panel
- Length of term: 4 years / Third of council elected three years out of four

Elections
- Voting system: First-past-the-post
- Last election: 7 May 2026
- Next election: 6 May 2027

Motto
- Progress with Unity

Meeting place
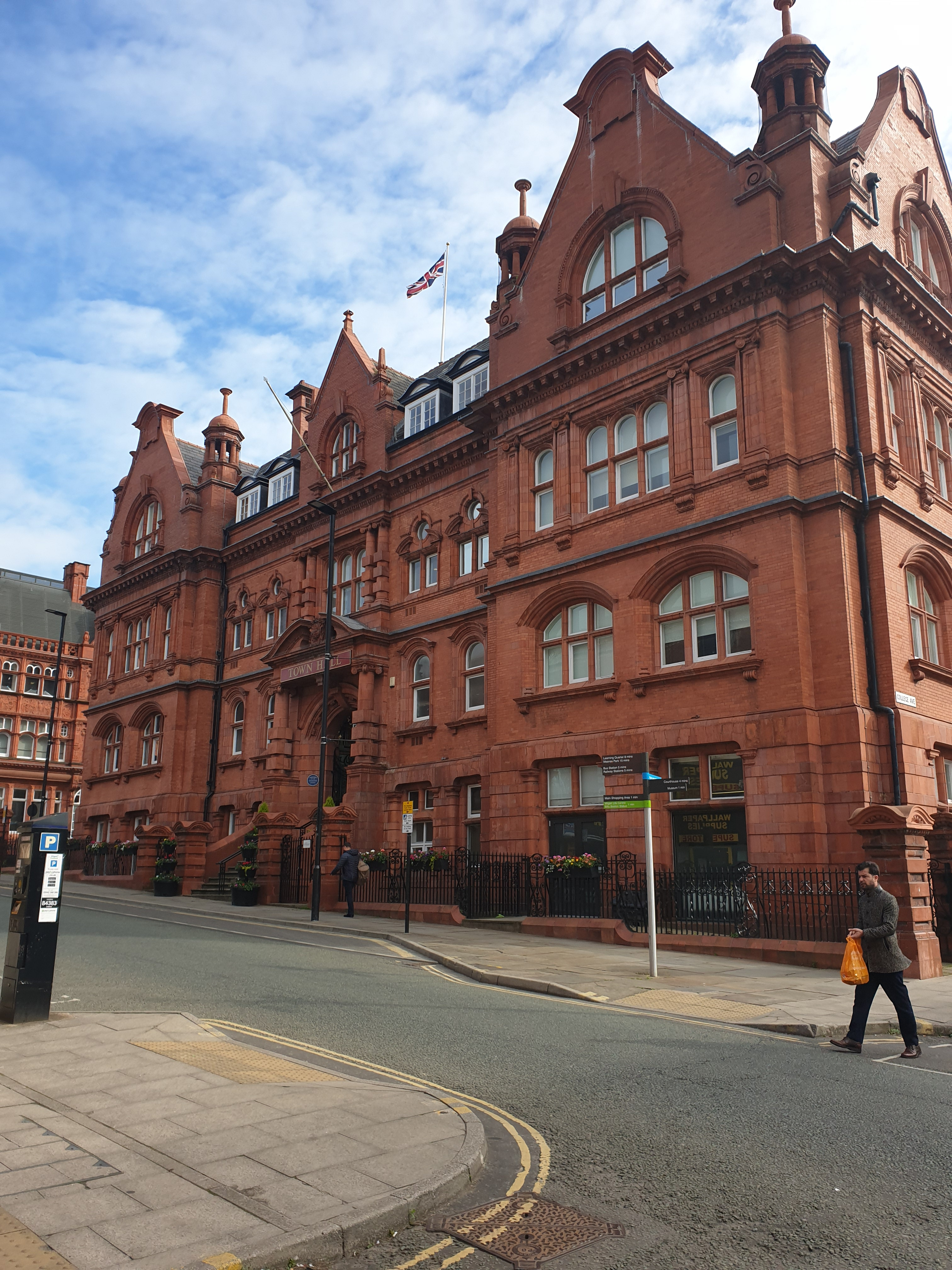
- Town Hall, Library Street, Wigan, WN1 1YN

Website
- wigan.gov.uk

Wigan Council, or Wigan Metropolitan Borough Council, is the local authority of the Metropolitan Borough of Wigan in Greater Manchester, England. It is a metropolitan borough council and provides the majority of local government services in the borough. The council has been a member of the Greater Manchester Combined Authority since 2011.

The council has been under Labour majority control since the metropolitan borough was created in 1974. It meets at Wigan Town Hall and has its main offices at the adjoining Wigan Life Centre.

== History ==
The town of Wigan was an ancient borough, having been granted a charter in 1246. From around 1350 the borough was led by a mayor. The borough was reformed to become a municipal borough under the Municipal Corporations Act 1835, which standardised how most boroughs operated across the country. It was then governed by a body formally called the 'mayor, aldermen and burgesses of the borough of Wigan', generally known as the corporation, town council or borough council.

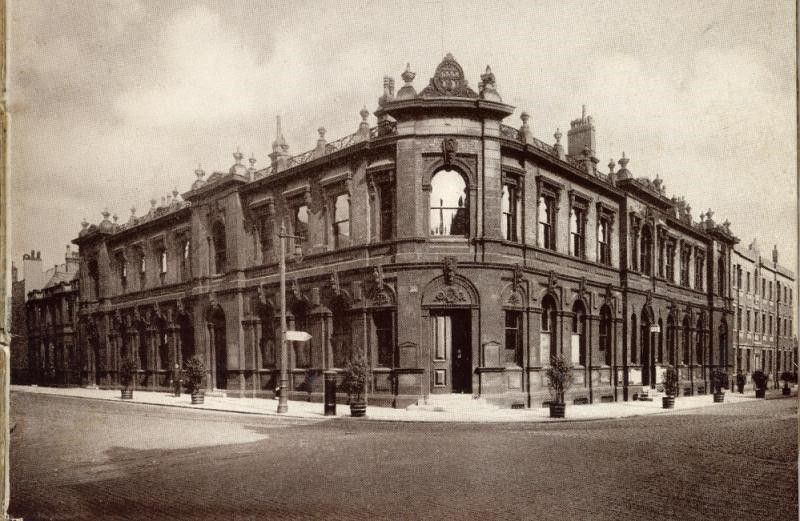
Old Town Hall, King Street: Built 1867, vacated 1990 and demolished 2013

When elected county councils were established in 1889, Wigan was considered large enough for its existing council to provide county-level services, and so it was made a county borough, independent from the new Lancashire County Council, whilst remaining part of the geographical county of Lancashire.

The larger Metropolitan Borough of Wigan and its council were created in 1974 under the Local Government Act 1972 as one of ten metropolitan districts within the new metropolitan county of Greater Manchester. The first election was held in 1973. For its first year the council acted as a shadow authority alongside the area's fourteen outgoing authorities, being the borough councils of Wigan and Leigh, the urban district councils of Abram, Ashton-in-Makerfield, Aspull, Atherton, Billinge and Winstanley, Golborne, Hindley, Ince-in-Makerfield, Orrell, Standish-with-Langtree, and Tyldesley, and the Wigan Rural District Council. The new metropolitan district and its council formally came into being on 1 April 1974, at which point the old districts and their councils were abolished.

The metropolitan district was awarded borough status from its creation, allowing the chair of the council to take the title of mayor, continuing Wigan's series of mayors dating back to the 14th century. The council styles itself Wigan Council rather than its full formal name of Wigan Metropolitan Borough Council.

From 1974 until 1986 the council was a lower-tier authority, with upper-tier functions provided by the Greater Manchester County Council. The county council was abolished in 1986 and its functions passed to Greater Manchester's ten borough councils, including Wigan, with some services provided through joint committees.

Since 2011 the council has been a member of the Greater Manchester Combined Authority, which has been led by the directly elected Mayor of Greater Manchester since 2017. The combined authority provides strategic leadership and co-ordination for certain functions across Greater Manchester, notably regarding transport and town planning, but Wigan Council continues to be responsible for most local government functions.

== Governance ==
Wigan Council provides metropolitan borough services. Some strategic functions in the area are provided by the Greater Manchester Combined Authority; the leader of Wigan Council sits on the combined authority as Wigan's representative. There are three civil parishes in the borough at Haigh, Shevington and Worthington which form an additional tier of local government for their areas; the rest of the borough is unparished.

=== Political control ===
The council has been under Labour majority control since the 1974 reforms.

Party	Period
Labour	1974–present

=== Leadership ===
The role of Mayor of Wigan is largely ceremonial. Political leadership is instead provided by the leader of the council. The leaders since 1974 have been:

Councillor	Party	From	To
Tom Hourigan	Labour	1 Apr 1974	Nov 1975
Bernard Coyle	Labour	Jan 1976	May 1991
Peter Smith	Labour	May 1991	May 2018
David Molyneux	Labour	23 May 2018	May 2026
Nazia Rehman	Labour	27 May 2026	Incumbent

=== Composition ===
Following the 2026 election and the recent Byelection the composition of the council was:

Party	Seats
Labour	43
Reform	25
Independent	7
Total	75

The Seven independent councillors (three of whom are supported by the Independent Network) sit together as the "Community Independent Alliance" group.

== Elections ==
Since the last boundary changes in 2023, the council has comprised 75 councillors representing 25 wards, with each ward electing three councillors. Elections are held three years out of every four, with a third of the council (one councillor for each ward) elected each time for a four-year term of office.

== Cabinet ==
The current composition of Wigan Council's Cabinet is as follows.

Party key	Labour

Post	Party	Councillor	Ward
Leader and Deputy Leader
Leader And Cabinet Member for Finance	Labour	Nazia Rehman	Abram
Deputy Leader and Cabinet Member for Adult Social Care	Labour	Keith Cunliffe	Leigh Central and Higher
Cabinet members
Cabinet Member for Planning, Environmental Services and Transport	Labour	Paul Terence Kenny	Winstanley
Cabinet Member for Children and Families	Labour	Laura Flynn	Aspull, New Springs & Whelley
Cabinet Member for Economic Development and Regeneration	Labour	Dane Anderton	Leigh West
Cabinet Member for Housing and Welfare	Labour	Susan Gambles	Golborne and Lowton West
Cabinet Member for Communities and Neighbourhoods	Labour	Chris Ready	Aspull, New Springs & Whelley
Cabinet Member for Police, Crime and Civil Contingencies.	Labour	Kevin Anderson	Leigh South
Lead Members
Lead Member for Town Centres	Labour	Yvonne Klieve	Lowton West
Lead Member for Armed Forces	Labour	Martyn Smethurst	Abram
Lead Member for Housing and Communities	Labour	Lawrence Hunt	Wigan Central
Lead Member for Residents and Environment	Labour	Lee Mcstein	Atherton South and Lilford
Lead Member for Women, Girls, Domestic Abuse and Equalities	Labour	Eileen Rigby	Pemberton
Lead Member for Digital, Resources and Comms.	Labour	Paul Molynuex	Worsley Mesnes
Lead Member for Heritage and Culture	Labour	Sheila Ramsdale	Wigan West

== Wards and councillors ==
The councillors as at November 2026 were:

Ward	Party	Councillor	Term of office
Abram	Reform	David Bowker	2026-30
Abram	Labour Co-op	Nazia Rehman	2024-28
Abram	Labour Co-op	Martyn Smethurst	2023-27
Ashton-in-Makerfield South	Reform	Kathy Morrill-Ashford	2026-30
Ashton-in-Makerfield South	Labour	Andrew Bullen	2024-28
Ashton-in-Makerfield South	Labour	Danny Fletcher	2023-27
Aspull, New Springs and Whelley	Reform	Jo Meadows	2026-30
Aspull, New Springs and Whelley	Labour	Laura Flynn	2024-28
Aspull, New Springs and Whelley	Labour	Christopher Ready	2023-27
Astley	Reform	Eileen Strathearn	2026-30
Astley	Labour	Barry John Taylor	2024-28
Astley	Labour	Christine Lillian Roberts	2023-27
Atherton North	Independent Network	Jamie Hodgkinson	2026-30
Atherton North	Reform	Paul Watson	2024-28
Atherton North	Independent Network	Stuart Andrew Gerrard	2023-27
Atherton South and Lilford	Reform	Martin Farrimond	2026-30
Atherton South and Lilford	Labour	Lee McStein	2024-28
Atherton South and Lilford	Labour	John Harding	2023-27
Bryn with Ashton-in-Makerfield North	Reform	Robert Kenyon	2026-30
Bryn with Ashton-in-Makerfield North	Independent	Scarlett Myler	2024-28
Bryn with Ashton-in-Makerfield North	Independent	Steve Jones	2023-27
Douglas	Reform	Matthew Lambert	2026-30
Douglas	Labour	Matt Dawber	2024-28
Douglas	Labour	Mary Callaghan	2023-27
Golborne and Lowton West	Reform	Susan Frame	2026-30
Golborne and Lowton West	Labour	Susan Gambles	2024-28
Golborne and Lowton West	Labour	Yvonne Klieve	2023-27
Hindley	Reform	Paul Manniex	2026-30
Hindley	Labour	James Talbot	2024-28
Hindley	Labour	Paul Blay	2023-27
Hindley Green	Reform	Liam Clarke	2026-30
Hindley Green	Labour	James Palmer	2024-28
Hindley Green	Labour	John Vickers	2026-27
Ince	Reform	Gemma Painter	2026-30
Ince	Independent	Tony Whyte	2024-28
Ince	Independent	Maureen O'Bern	2023-27
Leigh Central and Higher Folds	Reform	Tina Kennedy	2026-30
Leigh Central and Higher Folds	Labour	Fred Walker	2024-28
Leigh Central and Higher Folds	Labour	Keith Cunliffe	2023-27
Leigh South	Reform	Leon Peters	2026-30
Leigh South	Labour Co-op	Charles Rigby	2024-28
Leigh South	Labour Co-op	Kevin Anderson	2023-27
Leigh West	Reform	David Evans	2026-30
Leigh West	Labour	Sue Greensmith	2024-28
Leigh West	Labour	Dane Anderton	2023-27
Lowton East	Reform	Simon Smith	2026-30
Lowton East	Labour	Mike Smith	2024-28
Lowton East	Labour	Jenny Gregory	2023-27
Orrell	Reform	Paul Bannister	2026-30
Orrell	Labour	Anne Collins	2024-28
Orrell	Labour	Mark Tebbutt	2023-27
Pemberton	Reform	Simon Silcock	2026-30
Pemberton	Labour	Eileen Winifred Rigby	2024-28
Pemberton	Labour	Jeanette Prescott	2023-27
Shevington with Lower Ground and Moor	Reform	Lilian Rogers	2026-30
Shevington with Lower Ground and Moor	Labour	Vicky Galligan	2024-28
Shevington with Lower Ground and Moor	Labour	Paul Anthony Collins	2023-27
Standish with Langtree	Reform	Michael Whalley	2026-30
Standish with Langtree	Labour	Terry Mugan	2024-28
Standish with Langtree	Labour	Debbie Parkinson	2023-27
Tyldesley and Mosley Common	Reform	Adrian White	2026-30
Tyldesley and Mosley Common	Independent Network	James Fish	2024-28
Tyldesley and Mosley Common	Labour	Joanne Marshall	2023-27
Wigan Central	Reform	Lee Moffitt	2026-30
Wigan Central	Labour	Michael McLoughlin	2024-28
Wigan Central	Labour	Lawrence Hunt	2023-27
Wigan West	Reform	Sam Ashton	2026-30
Wigan West	Labour	Sheila Ramsdale	2024-28
Wigan West	Labour	Phyllis Cullen	2023-27
Winstanley	Reform	Paul Forbes	2026-30
Winstanley	Labour	Clive William Morgan	2024-28
Winstanley	Labour Co-op	Paul Terence Kenny	2023-27
Worsley Mesnes	Reform	Keith Whalley	2026-30
Worsley Mesnes	Labour	Paul Molyneux	2024-28
Worsley Mesnes	Labour	David Hurst	2023-27

== Premises ==
The council meets at Wigan Town Hall on Library Street, which had been built in 1903 as the Wigan Mining and Technical College. After the college moved to new premises, the building was converted into a town hall in 1990 to replace the Old Town Hall on King Street.

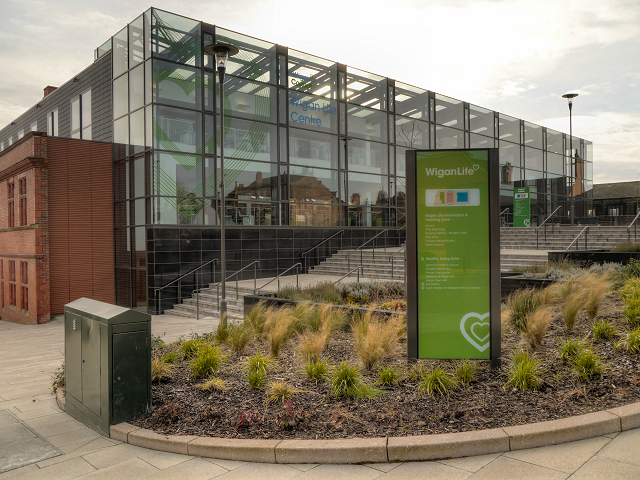
Wigan Life Centre, The Wiend, Wigan, WN1 1NH: Council's main offices

The council's main offices are at the Wigan Life Centre on The Wiend, a modern building completed in 2012 behind the retained façade of the former Municipal Buildings facing Hewlett Street and Library Street. The building also incorporates the town's library.

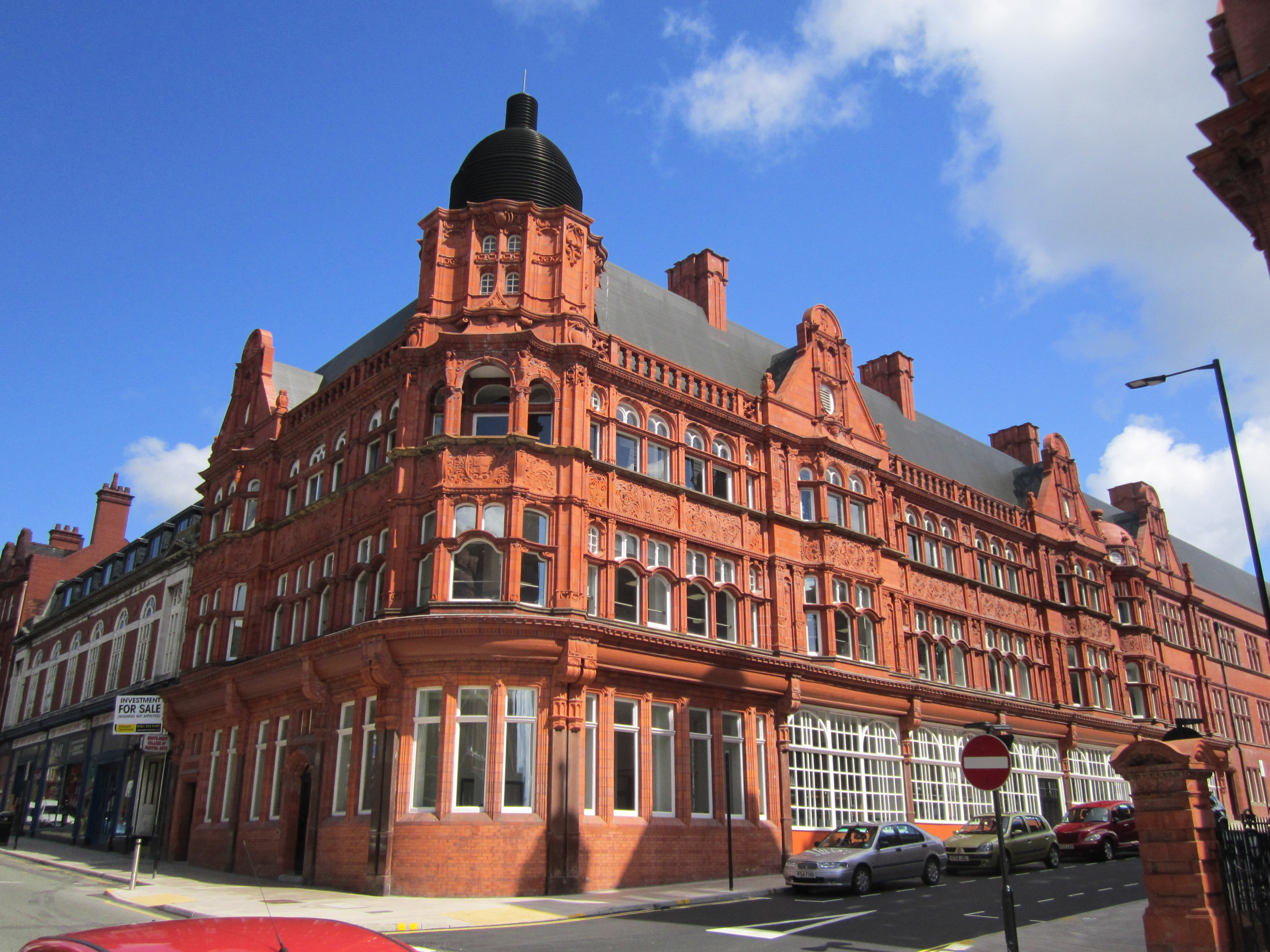
Municipal Buildings, Hewlett Street: Retained façade of 1900 building, with Wigan Life Centre behind

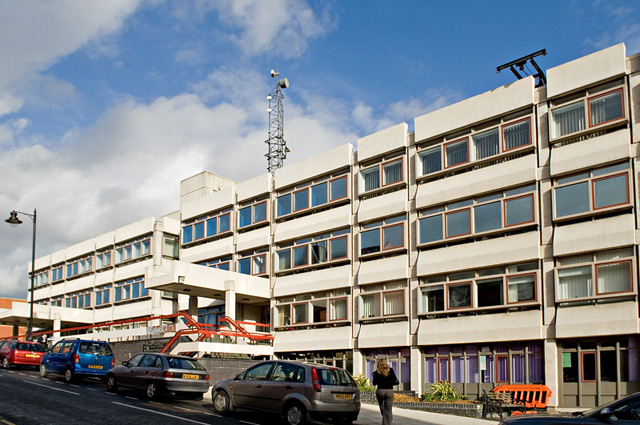
Wigan Civic Centre, Millgate: Council's main offices 1970–2018

The old Wigan Borough Council had held its meetings at the Old Town Hall on King Street, which had been built as a courthouse in 1867 and had become the council's headquarters in 1882. By the 1950s the council had moved its main offices to the Municipal Buildings, being a converted row of shops and offices at the corner of Hewlett Street and Library Street, which had been built in 1900. Meetings continued to be held at the Old Town Hall until the new Town Hall opened in 1990. The offices were supplemented by the construction of the Civic Centre on Millgate in 1970. After the council consolidated its offices at the Wigan Life Centre and Town Hall, the Civic Centre closed in 2018.
