= David Molyneux (politician) =

British politician

David Molyneux MBE
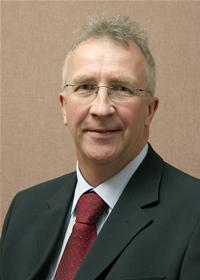

Honorary Freemen of the Borough
- Incumbent
- Assumed office 23 September 2026

Leader of Wigan Metropolitan Borough Council
- In office 23 May 2018 – 18 May 2026
- Preceded by: Peter Smith
- Succeeded by: Nazia Rehman

Member of the Greater Manchester Combined Authority
- In office May 2018 – 18 May 2026

Member of Wigan Metropolitan Borough Council for Ince
- In office 25 January 1982 – 7 May 2026

Personal details
- Born: David Trevor Molyneux
- Party: Labour

David Trevor Molyneux MBE is a British Labour politician and former leader of Wigan Metropolitan Borough Council in Greater Manchester. He was also a member of the Greater Manchester Combined Authority and was the combined authority's portfolio lead for Resources and Investment. Molyneux stood down as a councillor before the May 2026 local elections.

== Political Career ==
First elected to the council in 1982, Molyneux represented the ward of Ince. He was elected as leader of the council in 2018 following Peter Smith's departure from the role after 27 years in post. He retired from the post and as a councillor in May 2026.

== Honours ==
Molyneux was appointed Member of the Order of the British Empire (MBE) in the 2022 Birthday Honours for services to local government and the community in Wigan.

On the 23rd of September Wigan Borough Voted to give David Molyneux for 44 Years of Service to the People of Wigan Honorary Freemen of the Borough.

Political offices
Preceded by Peter Smith	Leader of Wigan Metropolitan Borough Council; 2018–2026	Succeeded by Nazia Rehman
