= Leigh South =

- Electoral ward
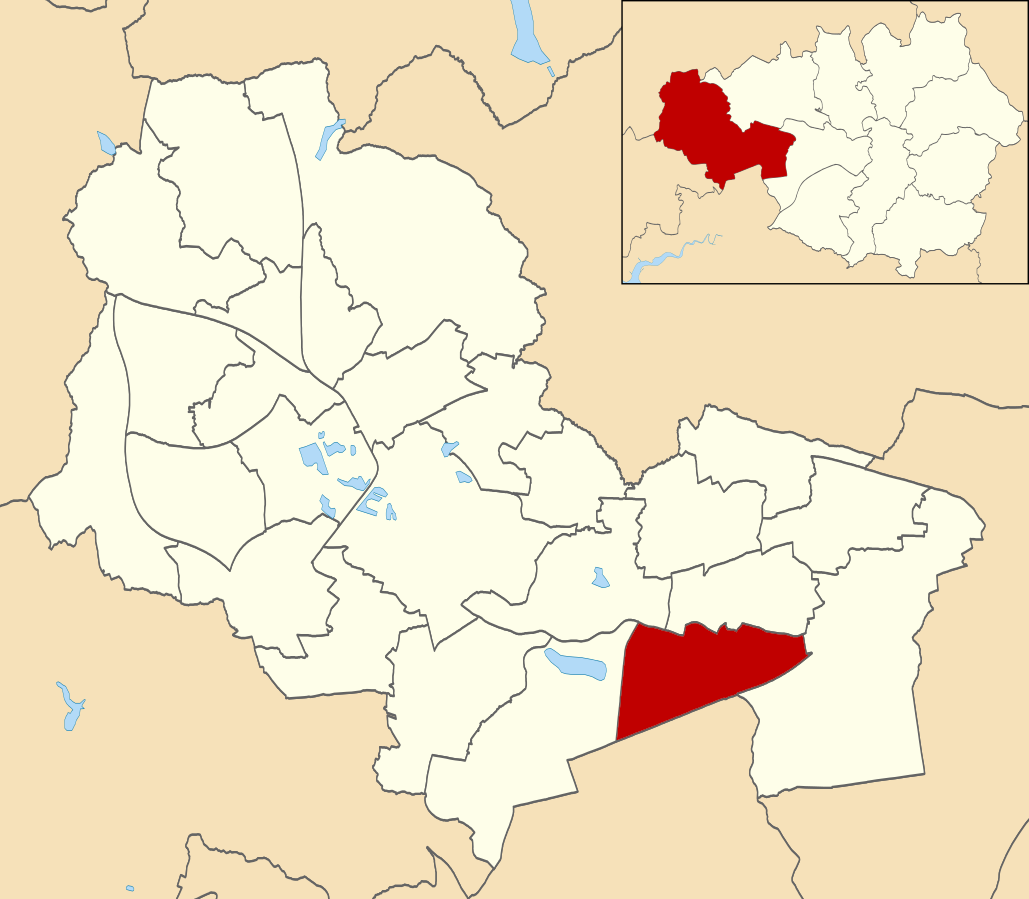
- Leigh South ward within Wigan Metropolitan Borough Council

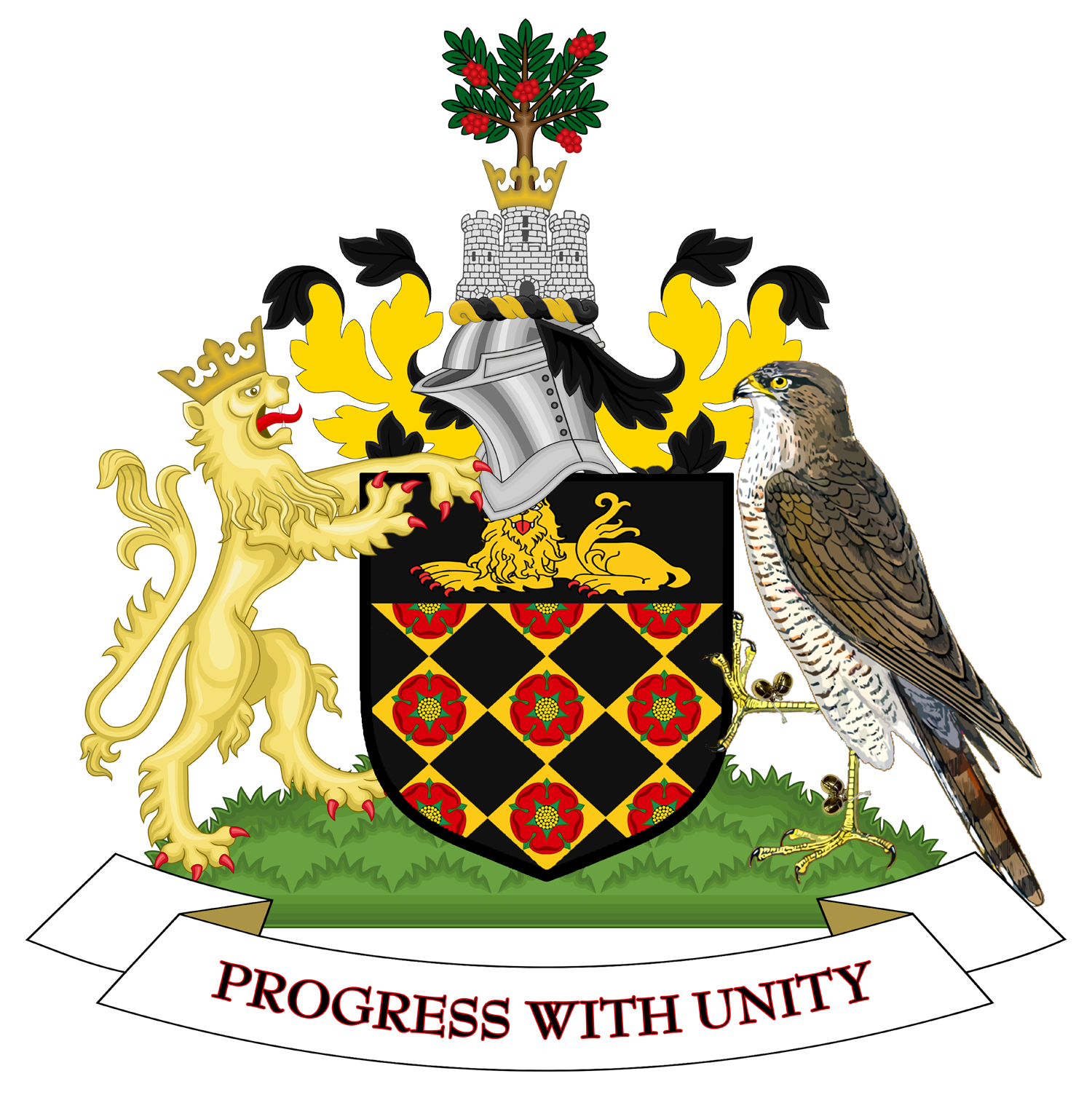
- Coat of arms
- Motto: Progress with Unity
- Interactive map of Leigh South
- Coordinates: 53.4858°N 2.5097°W
- Country: United Kingdom
- Constituent country: England
- Region: North West England
- County: Greater Manchester
- Metropolitan borough: Wigan
- Created: May 2004

Government
  - Type: Unicameral
  - Body: Wigan Metropolitan Borough Council
  - Mayor of Wigan: Sue Greensmith (Labour)
  - Councillor: Kevin Anderson (Labour)
  - Councillor: John O'Brien (Labour)
  - Councillor: Charles Rigby (Labour)

Population
  - Total: 14,379

Leigh South is an electoral ward in Leigh, England. It forms part of Wigan Metropolitan Borough Council, as well as the parliamentary constituency of Leigh.

== Councillors ==
The ward is represented by three councillors: Kevin Anderson (Lab), John O'Brien (Lab), and Charles Rigby (Lab).
