= Hindley (ward) =

- Electoral ward
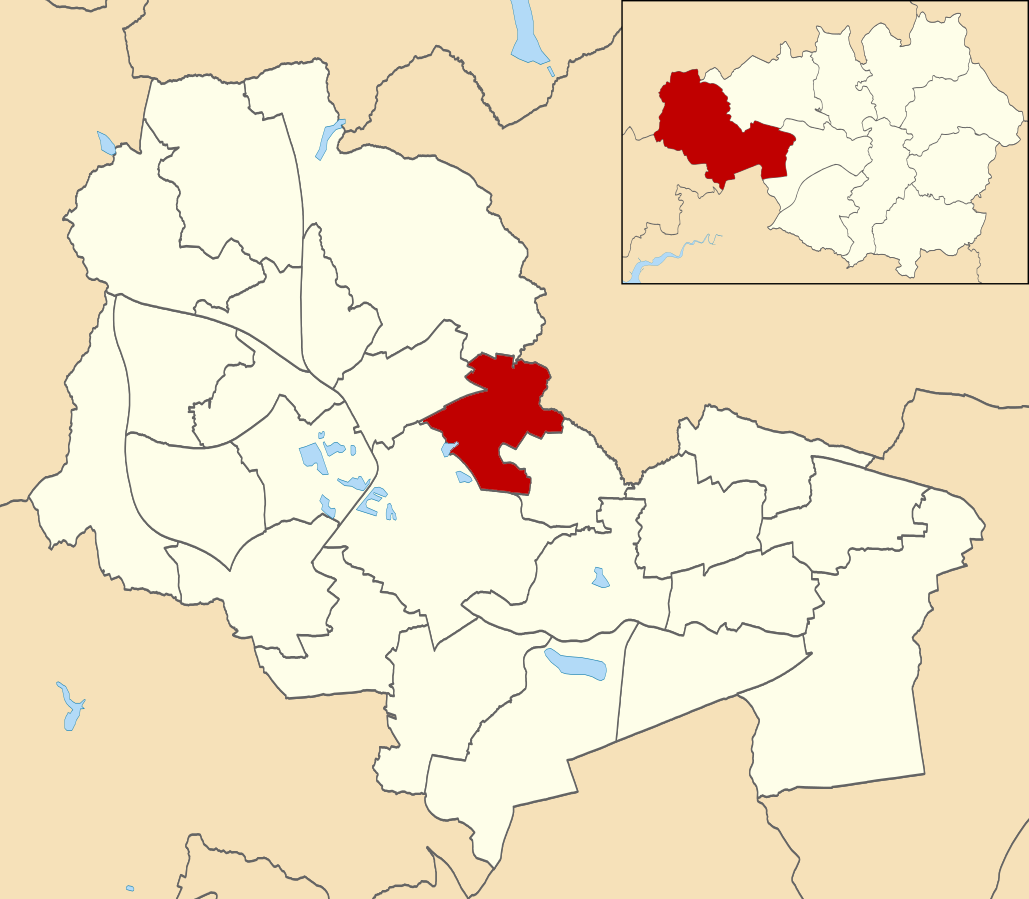
- Hindley ward within Wigan Metropolitan Borough Council

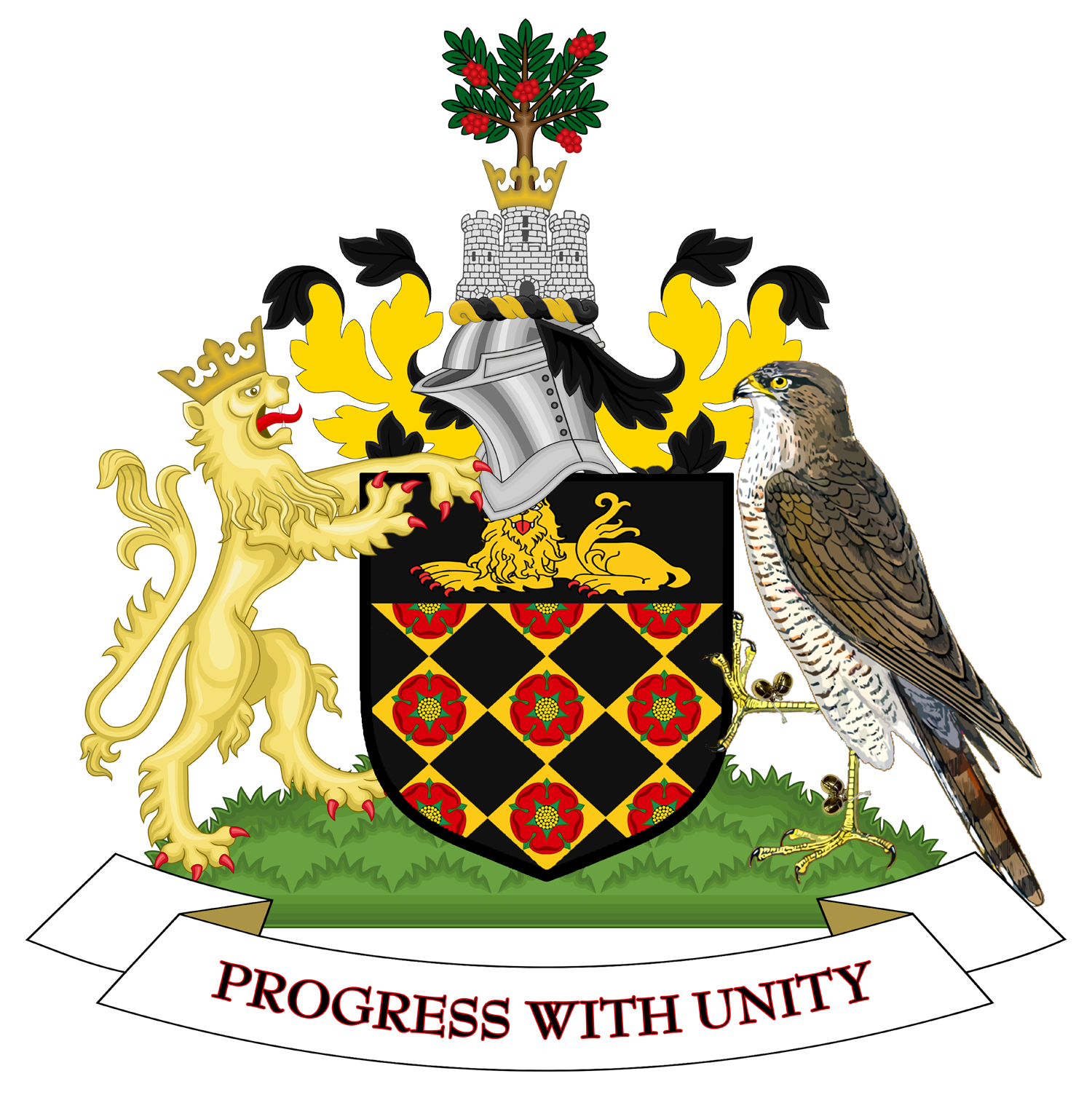
- Coat of arms
- Motto: Progress with Unity
- Country: United Kingdom
- Constituent country: England
- Region: North West England
- County: Greater Manchester
- Metropolitan borough: Wigan
- Created: May 2004
- Named after: Hindley

Government
  - Type: Unicameral
  - Body: Wigan Metropolitan Borough Council
  - Mayor of Wigan: Sue Greensmith (Labour)
  - Councillor: Paul Blay (Labour)
  - Councillor: James Churton (Labour)
  - Councillor: James Talbot (Labour)

Population
  - Total: 13,530

Hindley is an electoral ward in Wigan, England. It forms part of Wigan Metropolitan Borough Council, as well as the parliamentary constituency of Makerfield.

== Councillors ==
The ward is represented by three councillors: Paul Blay (Lab), James Churton (Lab), and James Talbot (Lab).
