= Atherton (ward) =

- Electoral ward
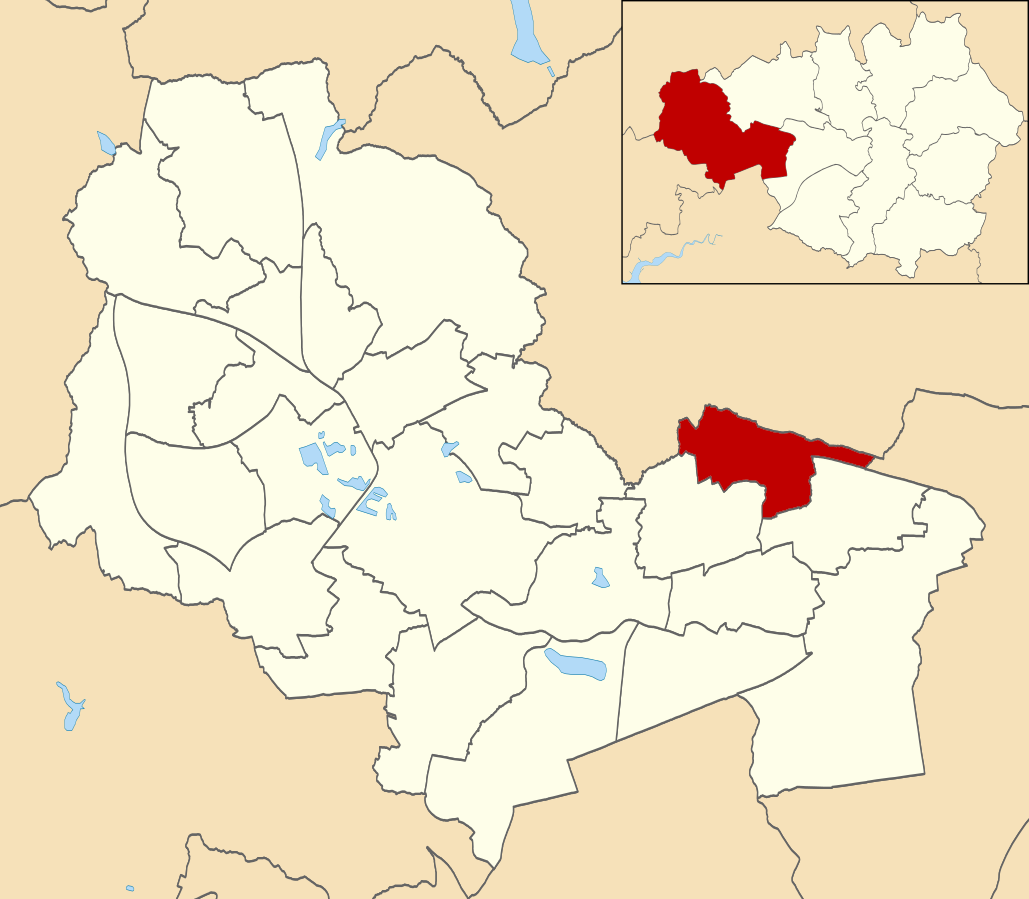
- Atherton ward within Wigan Metropolitan Borough Council

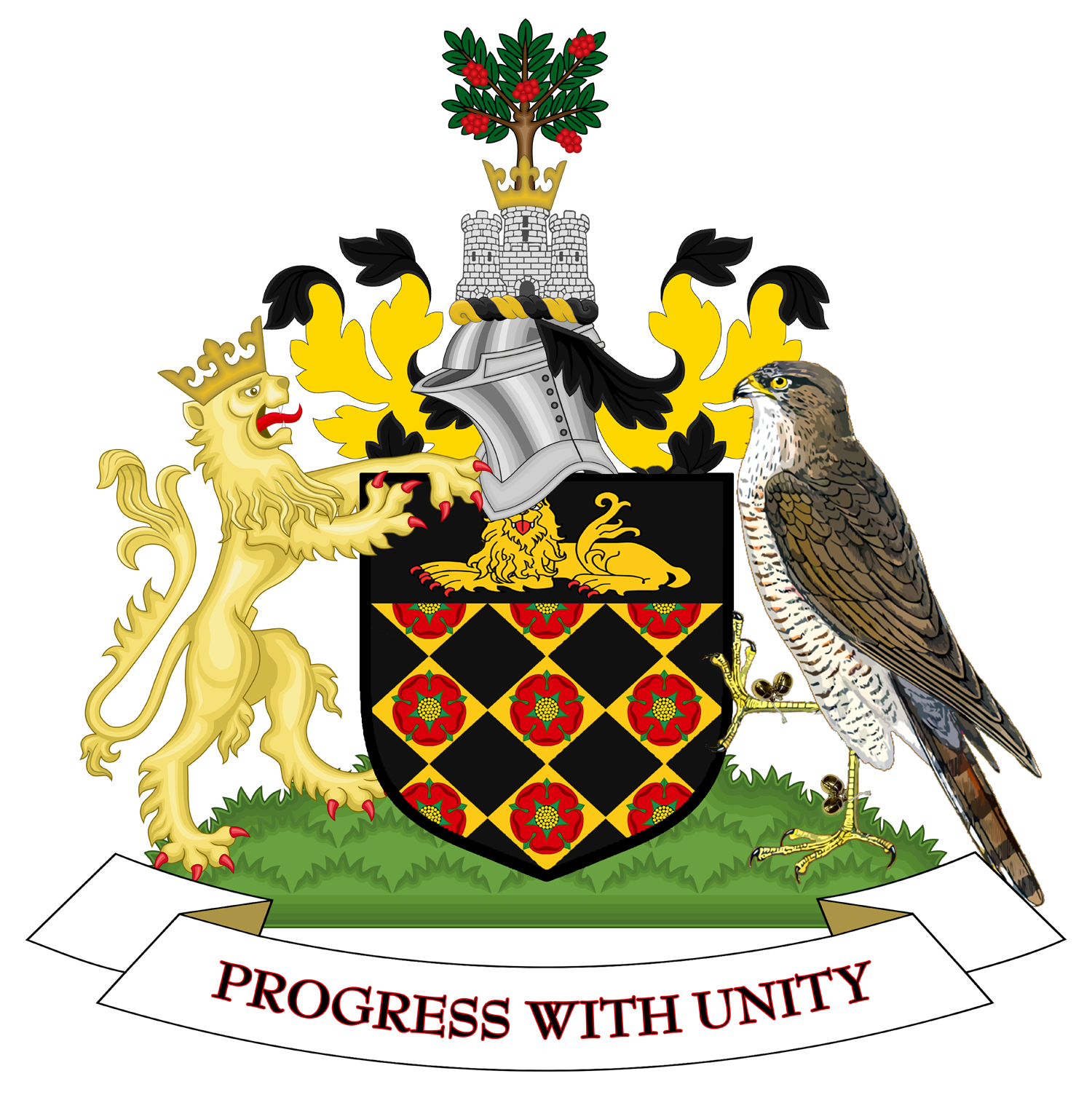
- Coat of arms
- Motto: Progress with Unity
- Country: United Kingdom
- Constituent country: England
- Region: North West England
- County: Greater Manchester
- Metropolitan borough: Wigan
- Created: May 2004
- Named after: Atherton

Government
  - Type: Unicameral
  - Body: Wigan Metropolitan Borough Council
  - Mayor of Wigan: Sue Greensmith (Labour)
  - Councillor: James Paul Watson (Independent)
  - Councillor: Stuart Gerrard (Independent)
  - Councillor: Jamie Hodgkinson (Independent)

Population
  - Total: 15,023

Atherton is an electoral ward in the Metropolitan Borough of Wigan, Greater Manchester, England. It forms part of Wigan Metropolitan Borough Council, as well as the parliamentary constituency of Bolton West.

== Councillors ==
The ward is represented by three councillors: James Paul Watson (Ind), Stuart Gerrard (Ind), and Jamie Hodgkinson (Ind).
