= Nazia Rehman =

British politician

Cllr Nazia Rehman

Leader of Wigan Metropolitan Borough Council
- Incumbent
- Assumed office 18 May 2026
- Preceded by: David Molyneux

Member of the Greater Manchester Combined Authority
- Incumbent
- Assumed office May 2026
- Preceded by: David Molyneux

Member of Wigan Metropolitan Borough Council for Abram (ward)
- Incumbent
- Assumed office 5 May 2016

Leader of the Labour Group in Wigan Metropolitan Borough Council
- Incumbent
- Assumed office 18 May 2026
- Preceded by: David Molyneux

Personal details
- Party: Labour
- Occupation: Chartered Accountant

Nazia Rehman is a British politician from Wigan, Greater Manchester, England. She has been a member of the Wigan Metropolitan Borough Council since 2016 as a representative of Abram Ward. Rehman was elected leader of the Wigan Metropolitan Borough Council as a member of the Labour group in 2026.
