= Shevington with Lower Ground and Moor =

- Electoral ward
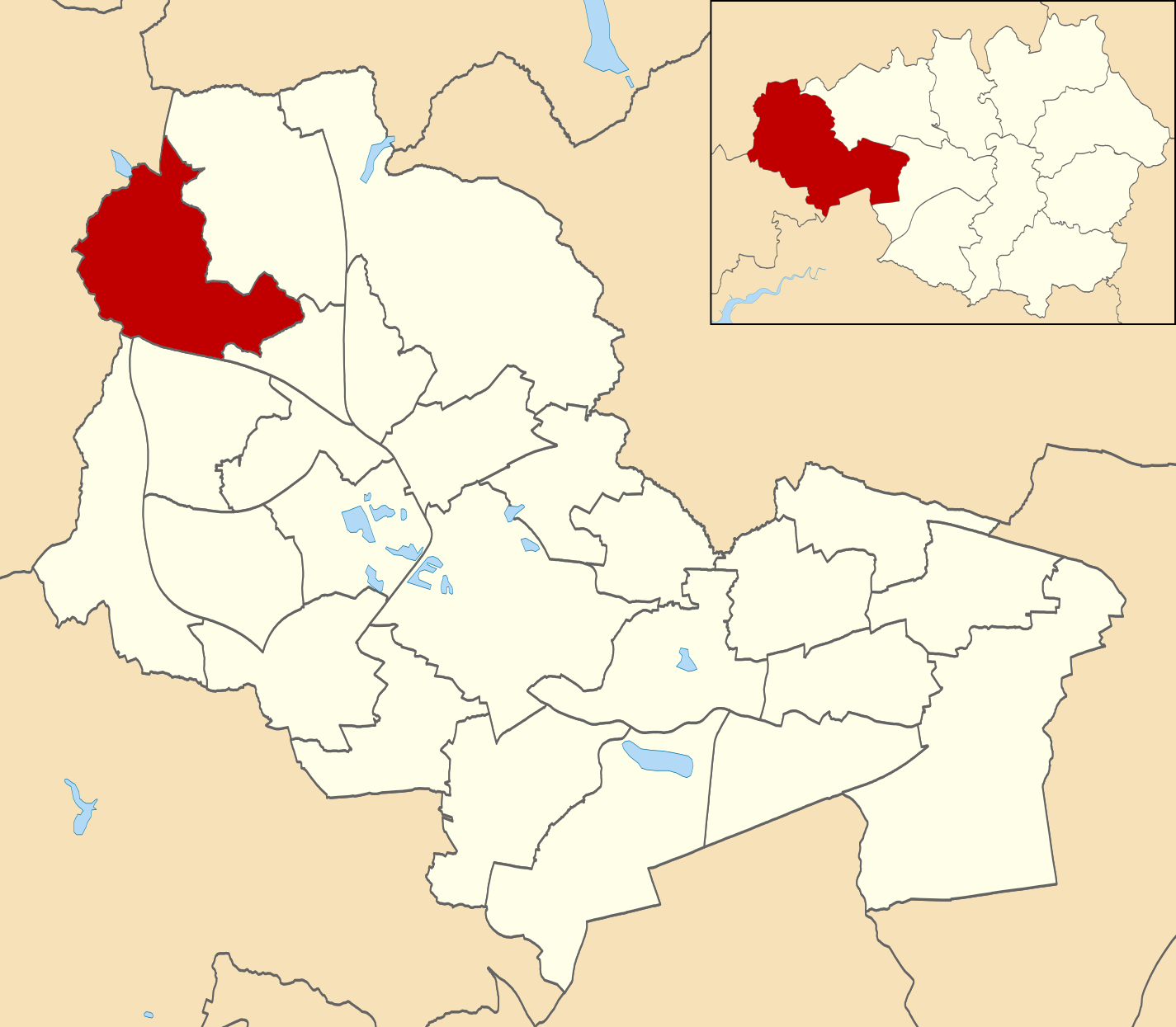
- Shevington with Lower Ground and Moor ward within Wigan Metropolitan Borough Council

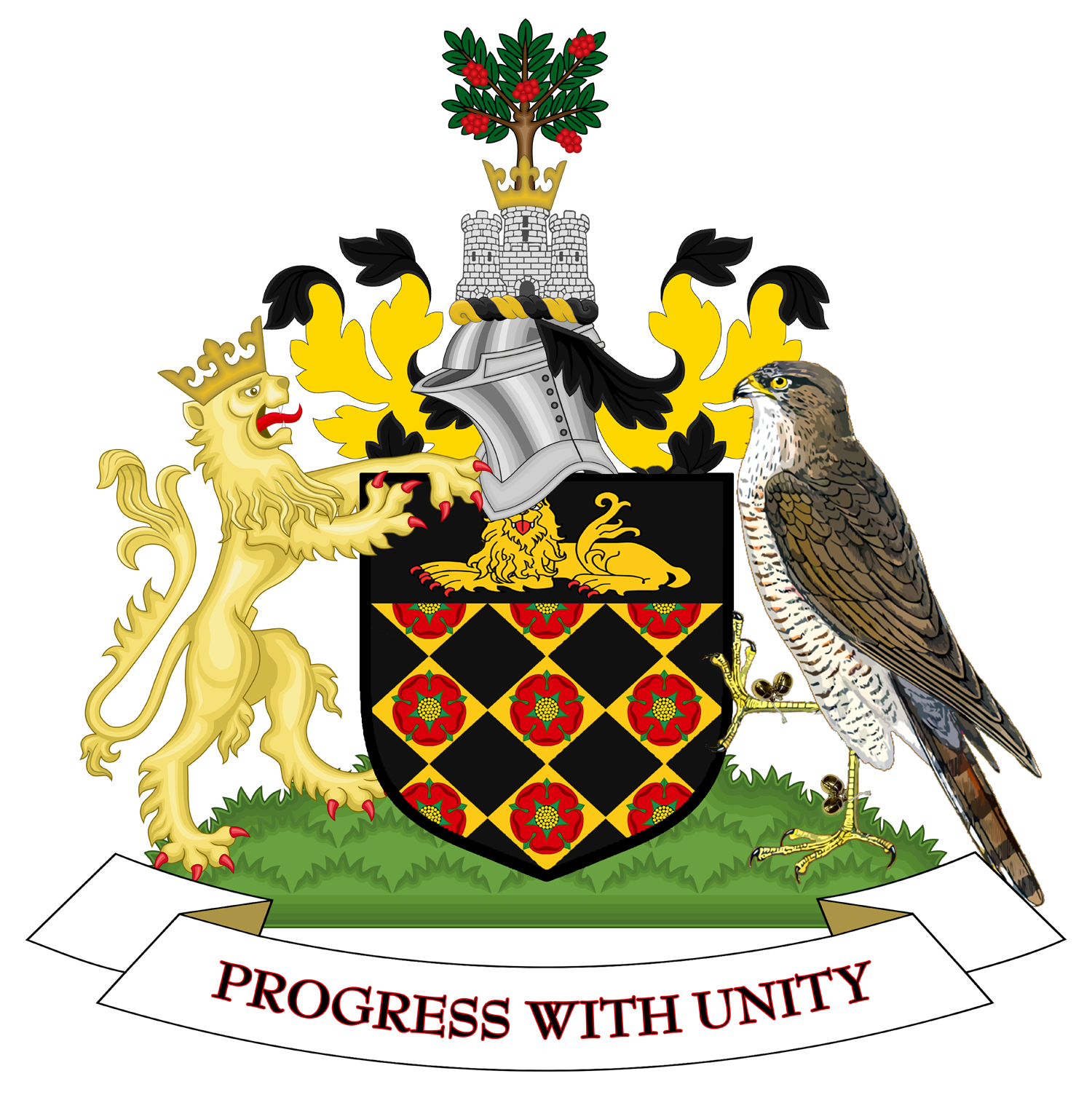
- Coat of arms
- Motto: Progress with Unity
- Country: United Kingdom
- Constituent country: England
- Region: North West England
- County: Greater Manchester
- Metropolitan borough: Wigan
- Created: May 2004
- Named for: Shevington and Standish Lower Ground and Shevington Moor

Government
  - Type: Unicameral
  - Body: Wigan Metropolitan Borough Council
  - Mayor of Wigan: Debbie Parkinson (Labour)
  - Councillor: Vicky Galligan (Labour)
  - Councillor: Paul Collins (Labour)
  - Councillor: Mike Crosby (Labour)

Population
  - Total: 11,440

Shevington with Lower Ground and Moor is an electoral ward in Wigan, England. It forms part of Wigan Metropolitan Borough Council, as well as the parliamentary constituency of Wigan.

== Councillors ==
The ward is represented by three councillors: Vicky Galligan (Lab), Paul Collins (Lab) and Lilian Rogers (Ref).

Election	Councillor	Councillor	Councillor
2004	Mike Crosby (Lab)	D. Brown (Lab)	John O'Neill (Lab)
2006	A. Bland (Con)	D. Brown (Lab)	John O'Neill (Lab)
2007	A. Bland (Con)	Debbie Fairhurst (Con)	John O'Neill (Lab)
2008	A. Bland (Con)	Debbie Fairhurst (Con)	Paul Liptrot (Con)
2010	Mike Crosby (Lab)	Debbie Fairhurst (Con)	Paul Liptrot (Con)
2011	Mike Crosby (Lab)	Paul Collins (Lab)	Paul Liptrot (Con)
2012	Mike Crosby (Lab)	Paul Collins (Lab)	Damian Edwardson (Lab)
2014	Mike Crosby (Lab)	Paul Collins (Lab)	Damian Edwardson (Lab)
2015	Mike Crosby (Lab)	Paul Collins (Lab)	Damian Edwardson (Lab)
2016	Mike Crosby (Lab)	Paul Collins (Lab)	Damian Edwardson (Lab)
By-election, 14 December 2017	Mike Crosby (Lab)	Paul Collins (Lab)	Marlaine Whitham (Lab)
2018	Janet Brown (Ind)	Paul Collins (Lab)	Marlaine Whitham (Lab)
2019	Janet Brown (Ind)	Paul Collins (Lab)	Marlaine Whitham (Lab)
2021	Janet Brown (Ind)	Paul Collins (Lab)	Mike Crosby (Lab)
2022	Vicky Galligan (Lab)	Paul Collins (Lab)	Mike Crosby (Lab)
2023	Vicky Galligan (Lab)	Paul Collins (Lab)	Mike Crosby (Lab)
2024	Vicky Galligan (Lab)	Paul Collins (Lab)	Mike Crosby (Lab)
2026	Vicky Galligan (Lab)	Paul Collins (Lab)	Lilian Rogers (Ref)

indicates seat up for re-election. indicates seat won in by-election.
