= Standish with Langtree (ward) =

- Electoral ward
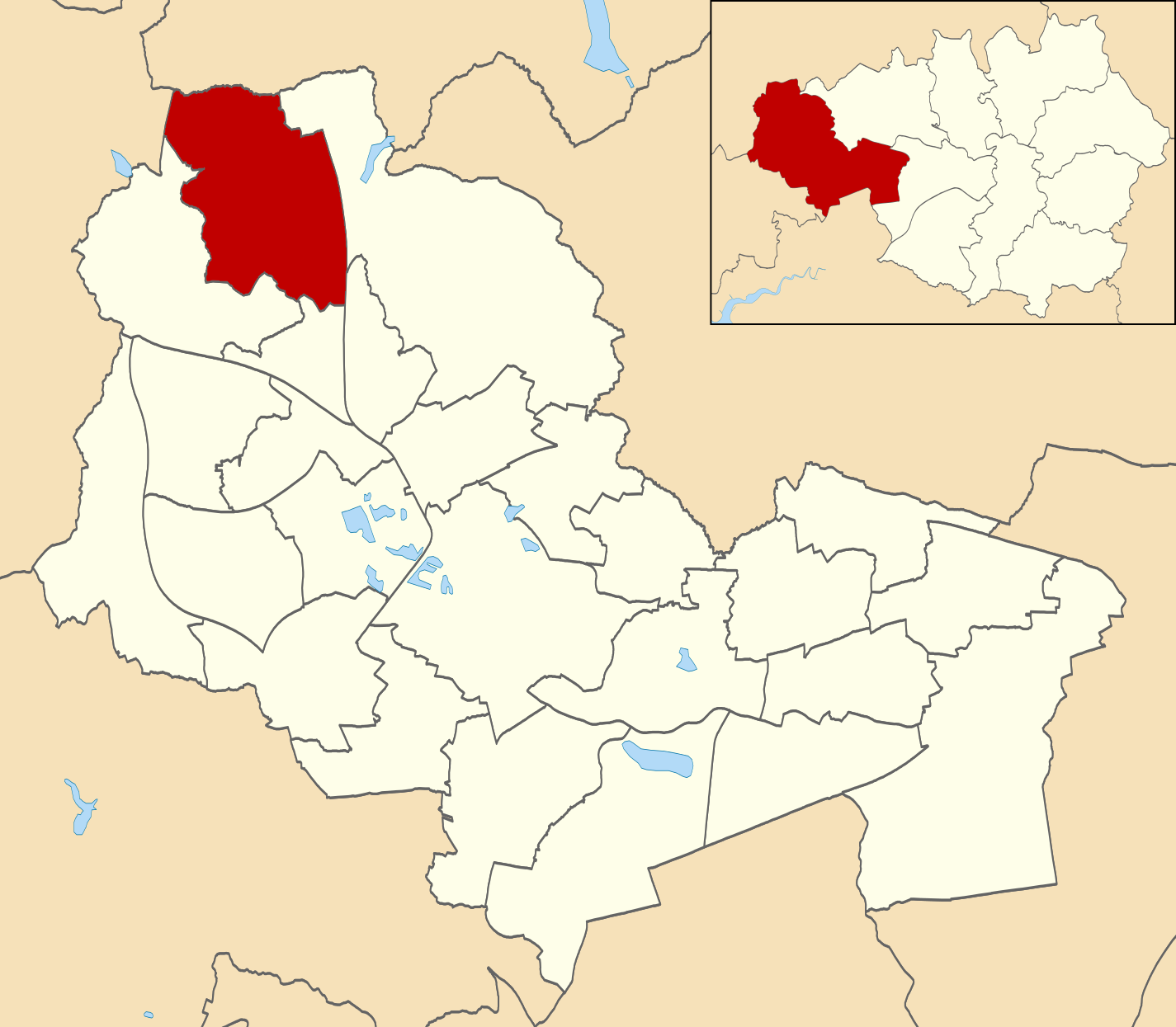
- Standish with Langtree ward within Wigan Metropolitan Borough Council

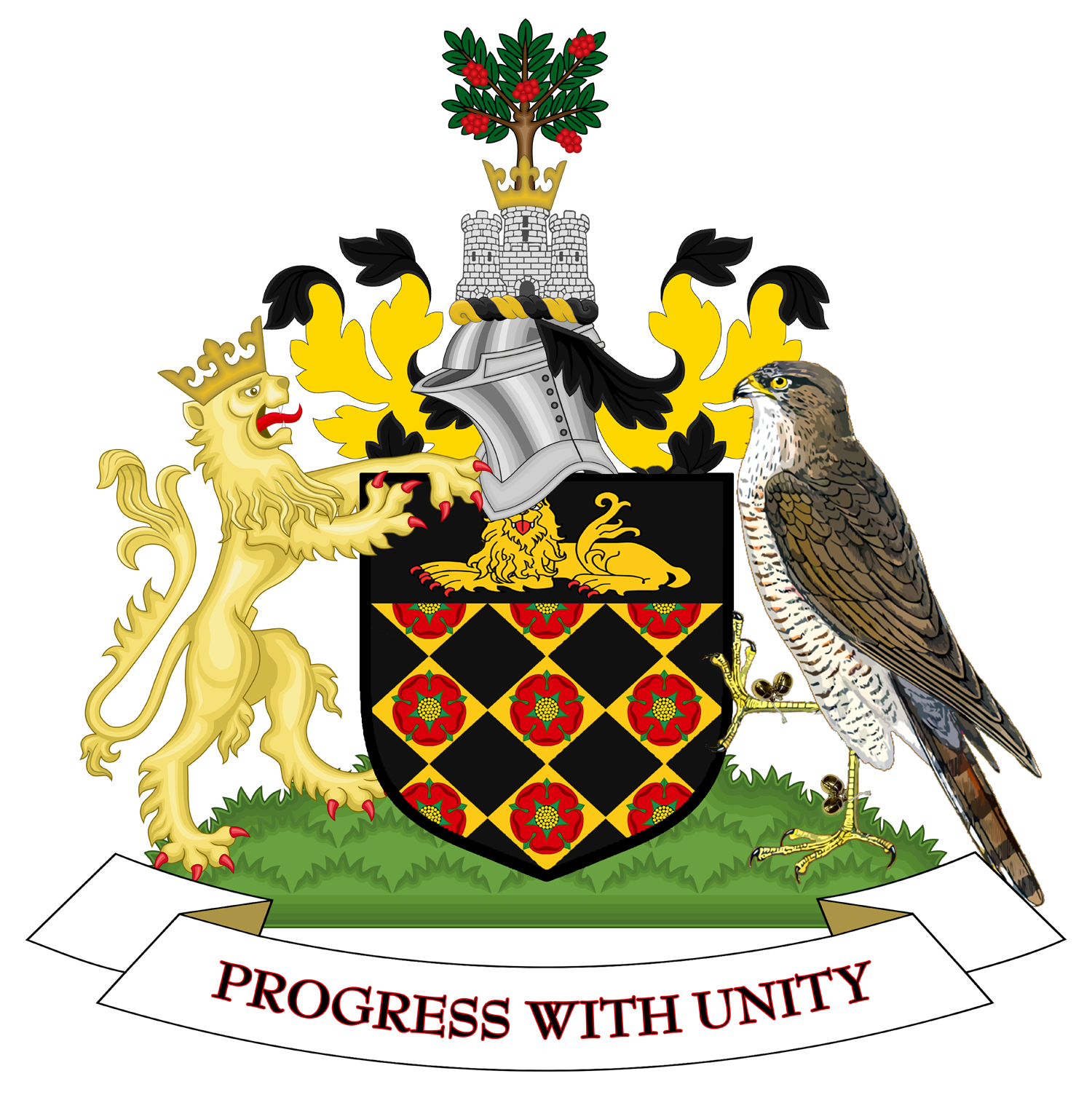
- Coat of arms
- Motto: Progress with Unity
- Country: United Kingdom
- Constituent country: England
- Region: North West England
- County: Greater Manchester
- Metropolitan borough: Wigan
- Created: May 2004
- Named for: Standish-with-Langtree

Government
  - Type: Unicameral
  - Body: Wigan Metropolitan Borough Council
  - Mayor of Wigan: Debbie Parkinson (Labour)
  - Councillor: Terry Mugan (Labour)
  - Councillor: Debbie Parkinson (Labour)
  - Councillor: Raymond Whittingham (Conservative)

Population
  - Total: 12,043

Standish with Langtree is an electoral ward in Wigan, England. It forms part of Wigan Metropolitan Borough Council, as well as the parliamentary constituency of Wigan.

== Councillors ==
The ward is represented by three councillors: Terry mugan (Lab), Debbie Parkinson (Lab), and Raymond Whittingham (Con).

Election	Councillor	Councillor	Councillor
2004	J. Downer (Con)	George Fairhurst (Con)	George Davies (Lab)
2006	Neil Whittingham (Con)	George Fairhurst (Con)	George Davies (Lab)
2007	Neil Whittingham (Con)	George Fairhurst (Con)	George Davies (Lab)
2008	Neil Whittingham (Con)	George Fairhurst (Con)	Judith Atherton (Con)
2010	Emma McGurrin (Lab)	George Fairhurst (Con)	Judith Atherton (Con)
2011	Emma McGurrin (Lab)	George Fairhurst (Ind)	Judith Atherton (Con)
2012	Emma McGurrin (Lab)	George Fairhurst (Ind)	Gareth Fairhurst (Ind)
2014	Debbie Fairhurst (Ind)	George Fairhurst (Ind)	Gareth Fairhurst (Ind)
2015	Debbie Fairhurst (Ind)	George Fairhurst (Ind)	Gareth Fairhurst (Ind)
2016	Debbie Fairhurst (Ind)	George Fairhurst (Ind)	Raymond Whittingham (Con)
2018	Adam Marsh (Con)	George Fairhurst (Ind)	Raymond Whittingham (Con)
2019	Adam Marsh (Con)	Debbie Parkinson (Lab)	Raymond Whittingham (Con)
2022	Judith Atherton (Con)	Debbie Parkinson (Lab)	Raymond Whittingham (Con)
2023	Terry Mugan (Lab)	Debbie Parkinson (Lab)	Raymond Whittingham (Con)
2024	Terry Mugan (Lab)	Debbie Parkinson (Lab)	Raymond Whittingham (Con)

indicates seat up for re-election.
