= 2003 Wigan Metropolitan Borough Council election =

2003 UK local government election

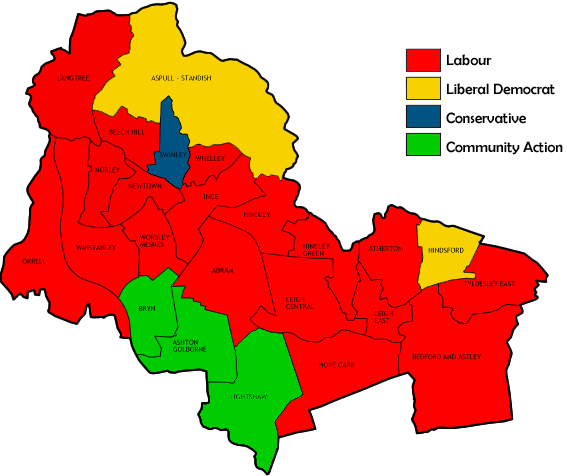
Map of the results of the 2003 Wigan council election.

Elections to Wigan Borough Council were held on 1 May 2003 with one-third of the council was up for election. Prior to the election, there had been two vacancies in Leigh Central, with Labour winning a by-election in June and the seat being fought in this election filled unopposed by Barbara Jarvis.

The election boasted a record number of candidates for an election of thirds, with 90 spread across all 24 wards. Whilst the Conservative's fielded a strong showing of all but three wards and the Lib Dems improved to fight half the wards, the bulk of the increase came from Community Action and the Socialist Alliance more than doubling their last year's totals, with the Socialist Alliance now contesting all but four wards and Community Action just under half. Labour reliably put up candidates for all wards, and the BNP a second candidate in Orrell.

Labour's share fell to under half of the votes for only the second time in the council's history, with the only other time being their low-point in 1975, with one of their lowest votes achieved. The main beneficiaries were the rapidly advancing Community Action Party, and to a lesser extent the Lib Dems, helping them to narrowly retain their third place in vote share behind the second place, and largely unchanged, Conservatives. The Socialist Alliance made little headway despite their near-full slate, and significantly fell back in their most competitive wards.

Labour lost five seats on the night, with each of three main competitors picking up seats. Community Action accounted for three, gaining further representation in Bryn and Lightshaw and also making another breakthrough in the formerly uninterrupted Labour territory of Ashton-Golborne. The Lib Dems picked up a seat in the historically competitive Aspull-Standish ward for the first time in over a decade, as well as comfortably defending their seat in Hindsford. The Tories strengthened their footing on the council with another gain in Swinley, a ward which had reliably elected Conservatives throughout the eighties, but had progressively been routed in the early nineties. This left Labour's majority at 58, the lowest in just under twenty years.

Overall turnout dropped from last year's partly recovered figure of just over a quarter of the electorate, to 22.7%.

== Election result ==
Wigan local election result 2003
Party	Seats	Gains	Losses	Net gain/loss	Seats %	Votes %	Votes	+/−
Labour	18	0	5	-5	75.0	49.6	26,761	-7.3
Community Action	3	3	0	+3	12.5	13.8	7,458	+4.6
Liberal Democrats	2	1	0	+1	8.3	14.0	7,568	+2.4
Conservative	1	1	0	+1	4.2	17.0	9,174	-0.3
Socialist Alliance	0	0	0	0	0.0	3.6	1,921	+1.1
BNP	0	0	0	0	0.0	1.7	944	+0.7

This result had the following consequences for the total number of seats on the council after the elections:

Party	Previous council	New council
Labour	65	60
Community Action	2	5
Liberal Democrat	3	4
Conservative	2	3
Socialist Alliance	0	0
BNP	0	0
Total	72	72
Working majority	58	48

== Ward results ==
Abram
Party	Candidate	Votes	%	±%
Labour	Carl Sweeney	1,261	56.7	−8.5
BNP	Dennis Shambley	576	25.9	+3.1
Community Action	Ronald Barnes	218	9.8	+9.8
Conservative	Marion Green	164	7.4	−4.3
Rejected ballots		5	0.2	-0.1
Majority		685	30.8	−11.6
Turnout		2,219	25.0	−3.1
Labour hold		Swing	-5.8	

Ashton-Golborne
Party	Candidate	Votes	%	±%
Community Action	Kevin Williams	1,256	46.8	+4.7
Labour	Patricia Holland	1,060	39.5	−4.8
Conservative	Marie Winstanley	276	10.3	+0.2
Socialist Alliance	Marian Markham	89	3.3	−0.1
Rejected ballots		3	0.1	+0.0
Majority		196	7.3	+5.2
Turnout		2,684	24.1	−2.7
Community Action gain from Labour		Swing	+4.7	

Aspull-Standish
Party	Candidate	Votes	%	±%
Liberal Democrats	Trevor Beswick	1,354	39.8	+9.3
Labour	George Davies	1,296	38.1	−6.2
Conservative	Barry Woolley	687	20.2	−2.0
Socialist Alliance	Judith Ford	61	1.8	−1.1
Rejected ballots		3	0.1	+0.0
Majority		58	1.7	−12.1
Turnout		3,401	28.8	−1.7
Liberal Democrats gain from Labour		Swing	+7.7	

Atherton
Party	Candidate	Votes	%	±%
Labour	Reginald Holmes	989	53.6	−1.2
Liberal Democrats	John Stackhouse	659	35.7	+2.2
Conservative	Ann Davies	193	10.5	+4.2
Rejected ballots		4	0.2	+0.2
Majority		330	17.9	−3.4
Turnout		1,845	21.3	−7.3
Labour hold		Swing	-1.7	

Bedford-Astley
Party	Candidate	Votes	%	±%
Labour	John Lea	881	53.5	N/A
Conservative	David Morris	393	23.9	N/A
Liberal Democrats	Glynnis Hogg	305	18.5	N/A
Socialist Alliance	Barbara Hennessy	61	3.7	N/A
Rejected ballots		6	0.4	N/A
Majority		488	29.6	N/A
Turnout		1,646	19.9	N/A
Labour hold		Swing	N/A	

Beech Hill
Party	Candidate	Votes	%	±%
Labour	Andrew Collins	1,010	55.3	−2.5
Liberal Democrats	Nigel Wickes	467	25.6	−6.0
Conservative	Barry Alder	233	12.8	+12.8
Socialist Alliance	Graham MacFarlane	111	6.1	+6.1
Rejected ballots		5	0.3	-0.1
Majority		543	29.7	+3.5
Turnout		1,826	20.1	−7.0
Labour hold		Swing	+1.7	

Bryn
Party	Candidate	Votes	%	±%
Community Action	Gary Wilkes	1,320	47.7	−0.3
Labour	Robin Atkinson	1,222	44.1	−0.9
Conservative	Stuart Foy	161	5.8	−1.1
Socialist Alliance	Paul Lewis	61	2.2	+2.2
Rejected ballots		4	0.1	+0.0
Majority		98	3.5	+0.5
Turnout		2,768	28.0	−1.4
Community Action gain from Labour		Swing	+0.3	

Hindley
Party	Candidate	Votes	%	±%
Labour	Jack Topping	1,278	66.3	−7.4
Conservative	Andre Walker	331	17.2	−8.1
Liberal Democrats	Tarek Gaber	190	9.9	+9.9
Socialist Alliance	Mark Tebbutt	117	6.1	+6.1
Rejected ballots		12	0.6	-0.5
Majority		947	49.1	+0.7
Turnout		1,928	18.2	−3.1
Labour hold		Swing	+0.3	

Hindley Green
Party	Candidate	Votes	%	±%
Labour	Peter Turner	1,039	57.9	−13.8
Conservative	Rosina Oxley	343	19.1	−8.0
Liberal Democrats	Solveiq Gaber	273	15.2	+15.2
Socialist Alliance	Claire Doherty	135	7.5	+7.5
Rejected ballots		5	0.3	-1.0
Majority		696	38.8	−5.8
Turnout		1,795	16.3	−3.3
Labour hold		Swing	-2.9	

Hindsford
Party	Candidate	Votes	%	±%
Liberal Democrats	Robert Bleakley	1,685	61.1	+5.7
Labour	Philip Loudon	943	34.2	+1.3
Conservative	Dorothy Angell	131	4.7	+0.7
Rejected ballots		0	0.0	-0.1
Majority		742	26.9	+4.4
Turnout		2,759	25.4	−3.1
Labour hold		Swing	+2.2	

Hope Carr
Party	Candidate	Votes	%	±%
Labour	John O'Brien	1,196	47.6	−4.5
Community Action	Janice Solinas	648	25.8	+6.7
Conservative	Andrew Oxley	564	22.5	−2.3
Socialist Alliance	Keith Fry	91	3.6	+0.0
Rejected ballots		11	0.4	+0.1
Majority		548	21.8	−5.5
Turnout		2,510	24.4	−3.7
Labour hold		Swing	-5.6	

Ince
Party	Candidate	Votes	%	±%
Labour	David Molyneux	1,085	73.7	−2.7
Conservative	Robert Rees	139	9.4	−1.5
Socialist Alliance	Michael Doherty	125	8.5	−3.9
Community Action	Ian Franzen	120	8.1	+8.1
Rejected ballots		4	0.3	-0.1
Majority		946	64.2	+0.3
Turnout		1,473	19.2	−2.0
Labour hold		Swing	-0.6	

Langtree
Party	Candidate	Votes	%	±%
Labour	Michael Crosby	1,211	42.5	−9.4
Conservative	Gareth Fairhurst	1,062	37.3	+7.7
Liberal Democrats	Freda Graham	476	16.7	−1.5
Socialist Alliance	John Pointon	91	3.2	+3.2
Rejected ballots		11	0.4	+0.1
Majority		149	5.2	−17.1
Turnout		2,851	24.5	−4.1
Labour hold		Swing	-8.5	

Leigh Central
Party	Candidate	Votes	%	±%
Labour	Barbara Jarvis	1,030	65.8	−5.7
Conservative	Alan Lowe	281	18.0	+1.4
Community Action	Daniel Burrows	170	10.9	−0.8
Socialist Alliance	Robert Stephenson	79	5.0	+5.0
Rejected ballots		5	0.3	+0.0
Majority		749	47.9	−7.0
Turnout		1,565	18.6	−2.9
Labour hold		Swing	-3.5	

Leigh East
Party	Candidate	Votes	%	±%
Labour	Keith Cunliffe	1,144	62.5	−14.5
Conservative	Derek Davies	368	20.1	−2.1
Community Action	James Forkgen	232	12.7	+12.7
Socialist Alliance	William Markham	79	4.3	+4.3
Rejected ballots		8	0.4	-0.4
Majority		776	42.4	−12.3
Turnout		1,831	16.9	−2.1
Labour hold		Swing	-6.2	

Lightshaw
Party	Candidate	Votes	%	±%
Community Action	Peter Solinas	1,540	45.4	+0.9
Labour	Alan Melling	1,221	36.0	−5.7
Conservative	James Grundy	568	16.7	+3.1
Socialist Alliance	Marie Winnard	58	1.7	+1.7
Rejected ballots		5	0.1	+0.0
Majority		319	9.4	+6.5
Turnout		3,392	27.9	−7.1
Community Action gain from Labour		Swing	+3.3	

Newtown
Party	Candidate	Votes	%	±%
Labour	Joy Birch	981	66.1	−10.8
Liberal Democrats	Martin Sutton	348	23.5	+23.5
Socialist Alliance	Barry Conway	146	9.8	−11.4
Rejected ballots		9	0.6	-1.2
Majority		633	42.7	−13.0
Turnout		1,484	17.5	−1.2
Labour hold		Swing	-17.1	

Norley
Party	Candidate	Votes	%	±%
Labour	Stephen Parker	815	59.2	−24.3
Community Action	Margaret Crank	508	36.9	+36.9
Socialist Alliance	Samuel Blakeman	51	3.7	−12.3
Rejected ballots		3	0.2	-0.3
Majority		307	22.3	−45.2
Turnout		1,377	20.5	+2.6
Labour hold		Swing	-30.6	

Orrell
Party	Candidate	Votes	%	±%
Labour	Ronald Capstick	1,380	46.7	−5.5
Conservative	Richard Clayton	1,074	36.4	−10.9
BNP	Richard Moreton	368	12.5	+12.5
Socialist Alliance	Robert Fairhurst	125	4.2	+4.2
Rejected ballots		6	0.2	-0.3
Majority		306	10.4	+5.4
Turnout		2,953	31.5	+1.2
Labour hold		Swing	+2.7	

Swinley
Party	Candidate	Votes	%	±%
Conservative	Henry Cadman	1,265	47.8	+7.5
Labour	John Ball	913	34.5	−2.3
Liberal Democrats	Alan Robinson	351	13.3	+0.9
Socialist Alliance	Frances Berka	111	4.2	+2.0
Rejected ballots		6	0.2	+0.1
Majority		352	13.3	+9.7
Turnout		2,646	30.7	−3.7
Conservative gain from Labour		Swing	+4.9	

Tyldesley East
Party	Candidate	Votes	%	±%
Labour	Stephen Hellier	1,237	50.8	−13.2
Liberal Democrats	Richard Derricutt	1,186	48.7	+13.5
Rejected ballots		12	0.5	-0.3
Majority		51	2.1	−26.7
Turnout		2,435	20.2	−0.7
Labour hold		Swing	-13.3	

Whelley
Party	Candidate	Votes	%	±%
Labour	John Earl	1,208	65.4	−5.4
Liberal Democrats	Jean Beswick	274	14.8	−6.9
Conservative	Joan Pietre	239	12.9	+12.9
Socialist Alliance	Janet Phillips	117	6.3	−0.7
Rejected ballots		10	0.5	+0.0
Majority		934	50.5	+1.5
Turnout		1,848	22.7	−1.4
Labour hold		Swing	+0.7	

Winstanley
Party	Candidate	Votes	%	±%
Labour	Philip Kelly	1,259	44.5	−20.1
Community Action	Stanley Barnes	961	34.0	+34.0
Conservative	Jonathan Cartwright	486	17.2	−17.5
Socialist Alliance	John Bolton	114	4.0	+4.0
Rejected ballots		9	0.3	-0.5
Majority		298	10.5	−19.4
Turnout		2,829	21.7	+1.7
Labour hold		Swing	-27.0	

Worsley Mesnes
Party	Candidate	Votes	%	±%
Labour	Joseph Baldwin	1,102	57.8	−16.8
Community Action	William Barnes	485	25.4	+25.4
Conservative	Thomas Sutton	216	11.3	−3.9
Socialist Alliance	Jacqueline Pointon	99	5.2	−4.7
Rejected ballots		6	0.3	+0.0
Majority		617	32.3	−27.0
Turnout		1,908	20.0	−0.2
Labour hold		Swing	-21.1	
