= Jonathan Cartwright =

Jonathan Cartwright may refer to:

- Jonathan Cartwright, character in The Ambassador's Daughter (1956 film)
- Jonathan Cartwright, political candidate in Wigan Council election, 2008
- Jonathan Cartwright (Arrowverse), character in the Arrowverse franchise
