= 2002 Wigan Metropolitan Borough Council election =

2002 UK local government election

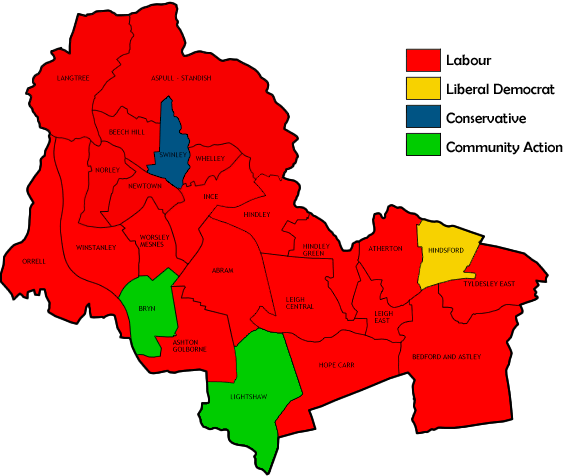
Map of the results of the 2002 Wigan council election.

Elections to Wigan Council were held on 2 May 2002, with one-third of the council to be re-elected. There had been a number of by-elections in the gap year, with a Labour gain from the Liberal Democrats in Hindsford, effectively cancelling out an earlier loss to them in Atherton. A Labour hold in Hope Carr in-between left both parties unchanged going into the election.

Candidates contesting rose slightly on the prior election's, with the Socialist Alliance's debut eclipsing the Liberal Democrat offering, with 9 candidates to 8, and the newly formed Community Action Party fielding their first handful, as well as a sole BNP contender in Abram. This counteracted the traditional opposition parties - the Conservatives and the Liberal Democrats - fielding slightly less this year and one fewer Independent contester than the last election.

The worrying string of poor turnout seen in recent elections was partially reversed, as turnout rose by a quarter upon the 2000s figure of 19.5%, to 25.2%. The Conservatives and the Independents fell back from their impressive performances in 2000, to the benefit of the newcomers, with Community Action immediately gaining two seats in the previously unblemished Labour strongholds of Bryn and Lightshaw. Labour successfully defended Orrell from another Tory gain, but suffered a loss in the former Conservative bastion of Swinley, with the Conservatives holding representation in Orrell and Swinley for the first time in just shy of twenty years. Elsewhere, the Lib Dems comfortably captured another seat in Hindsford. These gains reverted Labour's majority to a more normative 58, ending their five-year peak.

== Election result ==
Wigan local election result 2002
Party	Seats	Gains	Losses	Net gain/loss	Seats %	Votes %	Votes	+/−
Labour	20	0	4	-4	83.3	56.7	32,772	-0.2%
Community Action	2	2	0	+2	8.3	9.2	5,307	+9.2%
Conservative	1	1	0	+1	4.2	17.2	9,936	-7.9%
Liberal Democrats	1	1	0	+1	4.2	11.6	6,681	-0.3%
Socialist Alliance	0	0	0	0	0.0	2.5	1,428	+2.5%
Independent	0	0	0	0	0.0	1.5	859	-2.9%
BNP	0	0	0	0	0.0	1.0	571	+1.0%

This result had the following consequences for the total number of seats on the council after the elections:

Party	Previous council	New council
Labour	69	65
Liberal Democrat	2	3
Community Action	0	2
Conservative	1	2
Socialist Alliance	0	0
Independent	0	0
BNP	0	0
Total	72	72
Working majority	66	58

== Ward results ==
Abram
Party	Candidate	Votes	%	±%
Labour	Eunice Smethurst	1,631	65.2	−3.6
BNP	Dennis Shambley	571	22.8	+22.8
Conservative	Alicia Eccles	292	11.7	−19.5
Rejected ballots		7	0.3	
Majority		1,060	42.4	+4.7
Turnout		2,501	28.1	+15.7
Labour hold		Swing	-13.2	

Ashton-Golborne
Party	Candidate	Votes	%	±%
Labour	Andrew Bullen	1,313	44.3	−20.1
Community Action	Stanley Barnes	1,250	42.1	+42.1
Conservative	Jonathan Cartwright	300	10.1	−25.5
Socialist Alliance	Marian Markham	100	3.4	+3.4
Rejected ballots		4	0.1	
Majority		63	2.1	−26.7
Turnout		2,967	26.9	+11.1
Labour hold		Swing	-31.1	

Aspull-Standish
Party	Candidate	Votes	%	±%
Labour	John Hilton	1,584	44.3	−5.8
Liberal Democrats	Trevor Beswick	1,091	30.5	+10.8
Conservative	Barry Wolley	792	22.2	−4.6
Socialist Alliance	Janet Philips	105	2.9	+2.9
Rejected ballots		2	0.1	
Majority		493	13.8	−9.6
Turnout		3,574	30.5	+9.1
Labour hold		Swing	-8.3	

Atherton
Party	Candidate	Votes	%	±%
Labour	Susan Loudon	1,353	54.8	−8.6
Liberal Democrats	Patricia Myler	827	33.5	+12.7
Conservative	Ann Davies	155	6.3	−9.5
Independent	David Shallcross	132	5.3	+5.3
Rejected ballots		1	0.0	
Majority		526	21.3	−21.3
Turnout		2,468	28.6	+8.3
Labour hold		Swing	-10.6	

Bedford-Astley
Party	Candidate	Votes	%	±%
Labour	Frederick Walker	Unopposed	N/A	N/A
Labour hold		Swing	N/A	

Beech Hill
Party	Candidate	Votes	%	±%
Labour	Garry Rankin	1,416	57.8	+2.7
Liberal Democrats	Malcolm Hudson	774	31.6	−7.8
Independent	William Hurst	252	10.3	+10.3
Rejected ballots		9	0.4	
Majority		642	26.2	+10.4
Turnout		2,451	27.1	+1.0
Labour hold		Swing	+5.2	

Bryn
Party	Candidate	Votes	%	±%
Community Action	John Hodgkinson	1,397	48.0	+48.0
Labour	Alan Melling	1,311	45.0	−24.4
Conservative	Marion Green	200	6.9	−23.7
Rejected ballots		3	0.1	
Majority		86	2.9	−36.0
Turnout		2,911	29.4	+12.2
Community Action gain from Labour		Swing	+36.2	

Hindley
Party	Candidate	Votes	%	±%
Labour	Stuart Shaw	1,656	73.7	+24.1
Conservative	Andre Walker	567	25.2	+13.4
Rejected ballots		25	1.1	
Majority		1,089	48.4	+37.5
Turnout		2,248	21.3	+3.8
Labour hold		Swing	+5.3	

Hindley Green
Party	Candidate	Votes	%	±%
Labour	Stanley Simmons	1,535	71.7	+23.2
Conservative	Rosina Oxley	580	27.1	+8.1
Rejected ballots		27	1.3	
Majority		955	44.6	+28.7
Turnout		2,142	19.6	+3.6
Labour hold		Swing	+7.5	

Hindsford
Party	Candidate	Votes	%	±%
Liberal Democrats	Neil Hogg	1,724	55.4	+8.9
Labour	Philip Loudon	1,024	32.9	−11.3
Independent	Stephen Hall	234	7.5	+3.2
Conservative	William Graham	125	4.0	−0.9
Rejected ballots		4	0.1	
Majority		700	22.5	+20.3
Turnout		3,111	28.5	+4.8
Liberal Democrats gain from Labour		Swing	+10.1	

Hope Carr
Party	Candidate	Votes	%	±%
Labour	Kevin Anderson	1,498	52.1	+13.0
Conservative	Andrew Oxley	713	24.8	−3.0
Community Action	Peter Solinas	549	19.1	+19.1
Socialist Alliance	Keith Fry	104	3.6	+3.6
Rejected ballots		11	0.4	
Majority		785	27.3	+16.0
Turnout		2,875	28.1	+4.3
Labour hold		Swing	+8.0	

Ince
Party	Candidate	Votes	%	±%
Labour	Joan Hurst	1,231	76.3	+1.2
Socialist Alliance	Michael Doherty	200	12.4	+12.4
Conservative	Robert Rees	176	10.9	−3.4
Rejected ballots		6	0.4	
Majority		1,031	63.9	+3.1
Turnout		1,613	21.2	+6.2
Labour hold		Swing	-5.6	

Langtree
Party	Candidate	Votes	%	±%
Labour	John O'Neill	1,733	51.9	+4.0
Conservative	Gareth Fairhurst	988	29.6	−3.9
Liberal Democrats	Freda Graham	607	18.2	−0.4
Rejected ballots		11	0.3	
Majority		745	22.3	+7.9
Turnout		3,339	28.7	+8.5
Labour hold		Swing	+3.9	

Leigh Central
Party	Candidate	Votes	%	±%
Labour	Peter Smith	1,298	71.5	+1.3
Conservative	Timothy Matthews	301	16.6	−13.2
Community Action	Daniel Burrows	212	11.7	+11.7
Rejected ballots		5	0.3	
Majority		997	54.9	+14.5
Turnout		1,816	21.5	+6.8
Labour hold		Swing	+7.2	

Leigh East
Party	Candidate	Votes	%	±%
Labour	Anne Turnock	1,571	76.9	+22.2
Conservative	Derek Davies	454	22.2	+2.9
Rejected ballots		17	0.8	
Majority		1,117	54.7	+25.9
Turnout		2,042	19.0	+4.0
Labour hold		Swing	+9.6	

Lightshaw
Party	Candidate	Votes	%	±%
Community Action	Peter Franzen	1,899	44.5	+44.5
Labour	Tom Sherratt	1,776	41.7	−18.6
Conservative	James Grundy	581	13.6	−26.1
Rejected ballots		8	0.2	
Majority		123	2.9	−17.6
Turnout		4,264	34.9	+13.4
Community Action gain from Labour		Swing	+31.5	

Newtown
Party	Candidate	Votes	%	±%
Labour	Christine Hitchen	1,204	76.9	+8.0
Socialist Alliance	Barry Conway	332	21.2	+21.2
Rejected ballots		29	1.9	
Majority		872	55.7	+9.5
Turnout		1,565	18.8	+5.8
Labour hold		Swing	-6.6	

Norley
Party	Candidate	Votes	%	±%
Labour	Jeanette Prescott	1,017	83.5	N/A
Socialist Alliance	William Markham	195	16.0	N/A
Rejected ballots		6	0.5	
Majority		822	67.5	N/A
Turnout		1,218	17.9	N/A
Labour hold		Swing	N/A	

Orrell
Party	Candidate	Votes	%	±%
Labour	Ernest Swift	1,478	52.2	+3.9
Conservative	Stuart Foy	1,336	47.2	−4.4
Rejected ballots		15	0.5	
Majority		142	5.0	+1.8
Turnout		2,829	30.4	+9.1
Labour hold		Swing	+4.1	

Swinley
Party	Candidate	Votes	%	±%
Conservative	James Davies	1,189	40.3	−1.0
Labour	Susan Turner	1,084	36.8	−8.4
Liberal Democrats	Alan Robinson	365	12.4	+0.3
Independent	Stephen Halsall	241	8.2	+6.7
Socialist Alliance	Frances Thomas	65	2.2	+2.2
Rejected ballots		5	0.2	
Majority		105	3.6	−0.2
Turnout		2,949	34.4	+7.9
Conservative gain from Labour		Swing	+3.7	

Tyldesley East
Party	Candidate	Votes	%	±%
Labour	Brian Wilson	1,574	64.0	+7.1
Liberal Democrats	Richard Derricutt	866	35.2	+2.3
Rejected ballots		19	0.8	
Majority		708	28.8	+4.8
Turnout		2,459	20.9	+5.5
Labour hold		Swing	+2.4	

Whelley
Party	Candidate	Votes	%	±%
Labour	James Roberts	1,391	70.8	−4.4
Liberal Democrats	Jean Beswick	427	21.7	+21.7
Socialist Alliance	Judith Ford	138	7.0	+7.0
Rejected ballots		10	0.5	
Majority		964	49.0	−1.2
Turnout		1,966	24.2	−1.7
Labour hold		Swing	-13.0	

Winstanley
Party	Candidate	Votes	%	±%
Labour	William Evans	1,667	64.6	−0.7
Conservative	Richard Clayton	895	34.7	+0.0
Rejected ballots		20	0.8	
Majority		772	29.9	−0.7
Turnout		2,582	20.0	−5.5
Labour hold		Swing	-0.3	

Worsley Mesnes
Party	Candidate	Votes	%	±%
Labour	William Rotherham	1,427	74.6	+5.0
Conservative	Thomas Sutton	292	15.3	−15.1
Socialist Alliance	Jacqueline Pointon	189	9.9	+9.9
Rejected ballots		6	0.3	
Majority		1,135	59.3	+20.1
Turnout		1,914	20.1	+7.1
Labour hold		Swing	+10.0	

== By-elections between 2002 and 2003 ==
Leigh Central By-Election 26 September 2002
Party	Candidate	Votes	%	±%
Labour	Myra Whiteside	904	62.6	−8.9
Community Action	Peter Solinas	392	27.1	+15.4
Conservative	Tim Matthews	149	10.3	−6.3
Majority		512	35.5	−19.4
Turnout		1,445	17.1	−4.4
Labour hold		Swing	-12.1	
