= Standish-with-Langtree =

Former local government area in North West England

Coordinates: 53°36′N 2°42′W

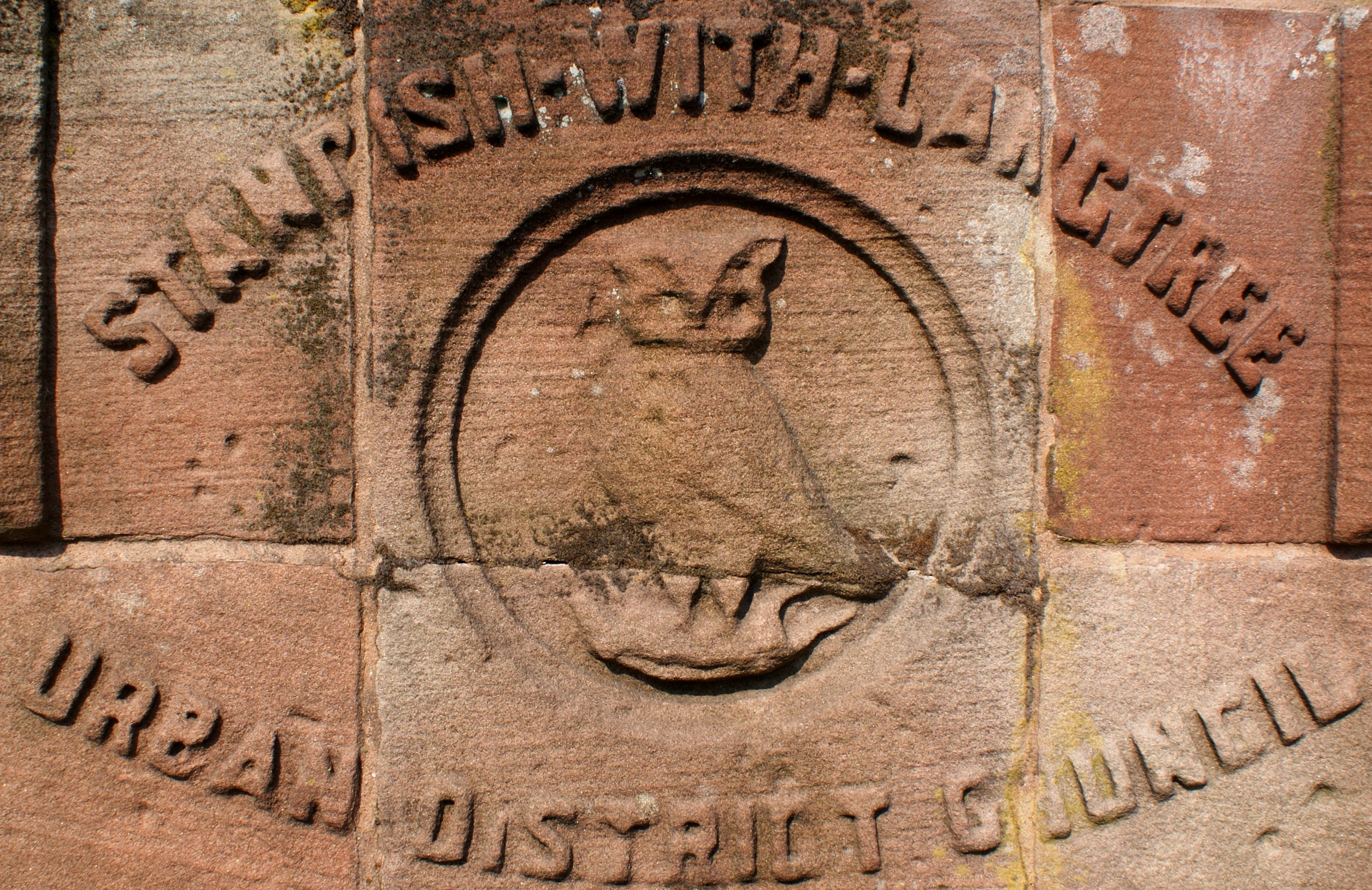
- Between 1894 and 1974, Standish-with-Langtree formed an urban district

- Location within Greater Manchester
- Population: 12,182 (ward, 2011 census)
- Metropolitan borough: Wigan
- Metropolitan county: Greater Manchester
- Region: North West
- Country: England
- Sovereign state: United Kingdom
- Police: Greater Manchester
- Fire: Greater Manchester
- Ambulance: North West

Standish-with-Langtree was, and to a limited extent remains, a local government district centred on Standish, Lancashire, in North West England. Historically it was an ancient township in the hundred of West Derby and county of Lancashire. This unit was abolished in 1974 following the Local Government Act 1972, the same act which established Greater Manchester.

== History ==
The township of Standish-with-Langtree was historically one of the ten administrative subdivisions of the ecclesiastical parish of Standish. In 1861, the population of the whole parish was 10,410 with Standish-with-Langtree having 3,054 people.

The township became a local board of health area in 1872 following the Local Government Act 1858. It became an urban district of the administrative county of Lancashire, after the Local Government Act 1894 and is now an unparished area.

In 1974 under Local Government Act 1972 the urban district was absorbed into Wigan Metropolitan Borough Council. No successor parish was formed so it became unparished.

== Today ==
The area is now represented by the Standish with Langtree ward, an electoral division of Wigan Metropolitan Borough. The population of the Ward, taken at the 2011 census was 12,182.
