= 2004 Wigan Metropolitan Borough Council election =

2004 UK local government election

Map of the results of the 2004 Wigan council election. Labour in red, Community Action Party in green, Liberal Democrats in yellow and Conservatives in blue.

Elections to Wigan Metropolitan Borough Council were held on 10 June 2004. The whole council was up for election with boundary changes since the last election in 2003 increasing the number of councillors by three. The Labour Party kept overall control of the council.

== Election result ==
Wigan local election result 2004
Party	Seats	Gains	Losses	Net gain/loss	Seats %	Votes %	Votes	+/−
Labour	42	0	0	0	56.0	41.6	35,360	-8.1
Community Action	18	0	0	0	24.0	24.4	20,761	+10.5
Liberal Democrats	8	0	0	0	10.7	10.4	8,805	-3.7
Conservative	7	0	0	0	9.3	17.3	14,686	+0.3
BNP	0	0	0	0	0.0	2.2	1,831	+0.4
Independent	0	0	0	0	0.0	1.7	1,457	+1.7
Green	0	0	0	0	0.0	1.4	1,180	+1.4

This result had the following consequences for the total number of seats on the Council after the elections:

Party	Previous council	New council
Labour	60	42
Community Action	5	18
Liberal Democrat	4	8
Conservative	3	7
BNP	0	0
Independent	0	0
Green	0	0
Total	72	75
Working majority	48	9

== Ward results ==
Abram
Party	Candidate	Votes	%	±%
Labour	Audrey Bennett	1,809	58.1	N/A
Labour	Eunice Smethurst	1,686		
Labour	Carl Sweeney	1,629		
BNP	Dennis Shambley	647	20.8	N/A
Conservative	Marion Green	625	20.1	N/A
Rejected ballots		31	1.0	N/A
Majority		982	37.3	N/A
Turnout		3,112	31.7	N/A
Labour win (new seat)				
Labour win (new seat)				
Labour win (new seat)				

Ashton
Party	Candidate	Votes	%	±%
Community Action	Paul Tushingham	2,366	57.8	N/A
Community Action	Walter Carney	2,302		
Community Action	Claire Daington	2,229		
Labour	Nigel Ash	1,302	31.8	N/A
Labour	Barry Hampson	1,029		
Labour	Frederick Lever	1,012		
Conservative	Marie Winstanley	402	9.8	N/A
Rejected ballots		22	0.5	N/A
Majority		927	26.0	N/A
Turnout		4,092	44.6	N/A
Community Action win (new seat)				
Community Action win (new seat)				
Community Action win (new seat)				

Aspull, New Springs, Whelley
Party	Candidate	Votes	%	±%
Labour	John Hilton	1,758	52.2	N/A
Labour	Christopher Ready	1,744		
Liberal Democrats	Jean Beswick	1,528	45.3	N/A
Labour	James Roberts	1,519		
Liberal Democrats	Alan Robinson	1,134		
Liberal Democrats	Christopher Thomas	1,030		
Rejected ballots		84	2.5	N/A
Majority		9	6.8	N/A
Turnout		3,370	34.6	N/A
Labour win (new seat)				
Labour win (new seat)				
Liberal Democrats win (new seat)				

Astley Mosley Common
Party	Candidate	Votes	%	±%
Labour	Brian Wilson	1,501	39.8	N/A
Liberal Democrats	Glynnis Hogg	1,367	36.2	N/A
Liberal Democrats	Joseph Haley	1,259		
Liberal Democrats	John Stackhouse	1,173		
Labour	John Lea	1,122		
Labour	Alan Stephenson	1,095		
Green	Ian Davies	870	23.0	N/A
Rejected ballots		37	1.0	N/A
Majority		137	3.5	N/A
Turnout		3,775	39.6	N/A
Labour win (new seat)				
Liberal Democrats win (new seat)				
Liberal Democrats win (new seat)				

Atherleigh
Party	Candidate	Votes	%	±%
Labour	Susan Loudon	1,219	48.4	N/A
Labour	Mark Aldred	1,214		
Labour	Anne Turnock	1,207		
Community Action	Francis Myler	683	27.1	N/A
Community Action	Patricia Myler	680		
Conservative	Ann Davies	584	23.2	N/A
Community Action	Gladys Wilkes	442		
Rejected ballots		33	1.3	N/A
Majority		524	21.3	N/A
Turnout		2,519	33.7	N/A
Labour win (new seat)				
Labour win (new seat)				
Labour win (new seat)				

Atherton
Party	Candidate	Votes	%	±%
Liberal Democrats	Robert Splaine	1,705	42.9	N/A
Liberal Democrats	David Higginbottom	1,525		
Labour	Karen Aldred	1,487	37.5	N/A
Liberal Democrats	Andrew Moore	1,414		
Labour	Philip Loudon	1,320		
Labour	Reginald Holmes	1,292		
Conservative	Malcolm Parr	449	11.3	N/A
Green	Nicholas Redmond	310	7.8	N/A
Rejected ballots		19	0.5	N/A
Majority		73	5.5	N/A
Turnout		3,970	36.3	N/A
Liberal Democrats win (new seat)				
Liberal Democrats win (new seat)				
Labour win (new seat)				

Bryn
Party	Candidate	Votes	%	±%
Community Action	John Hodgkinson	2,370	60.2	N/A
Community Action	Gary Wilkes	2,297		
Community Action	Brian Merry	2,239		
Labour	Mildred Millington	1,233	31.3	N/A
Labour	Alan Melling	1,183		
Labour	William Evans	986		
Conservative	William Winstanley	323	8.2	N/A
Rejected ballots		11	0.3	N/A
Majority		1,006	28.9	N/A
Turnout		3,937	42.3	N/A
Community Action win (new seat)				
Community Action win (new seat)				
Community Action win (new seat)				

Douglas
Party	Candidate	Votes	%	±%
Labour	Joy Birch	1,427	51.3	N/A
Labour	Christine Hitchen	1,347		
Labour	Margaret Coghlin	1,318		
Community Action	Lucy Beale	1,296	46.6	N/A
Community Action	Robert Beale	1,287		
Community Action	Janette Thomas	1,223		
Rejected ballots		61	2.2	N/A
Majority		131	4.7	N/A
Turnout		2,784	30.2	N/A
Labour win (new seat)				
Labour win (new seat)				
Labour win (new seat)				

Golborne and Lowton West
Party	Candidate	Votes	%	±%
Community Action	Peter Franzen	1,639	49.4	N/A
Community Action	Kevin Williams	1,414		
Community Action	Peter Solinas	1,413		
Labour	David Kelly	1,298	39.1	N/A
Labour	Martin King	1,258		
Labour	Gerard Bretherton	1,216		
Conservative	Rosina Oxley	355	10.7	N/A
Rejected ballots		24	0.7	N/A
Majority		115	10.3	N/A
Turnout		3,316	38.3	N/A
Community Action win (new seat)				
Community Action win (new seat)				
Community Action win (new seat)				

Hindley
Party	Candidate	Votes	%	±%
Labour	Alfred Robinson	1,578	39.1	N/A
Community Action	James Ellis	1,153	28.6	N/A
Community Action	Dorothy Grace	1,134		
Labour	John Holland	1,041		
Labour	Stephen Murphy	1,024		
Independent	David Culshaw	874	21.7	N/A
Community Action	Edward Houlton	614		
Conservative	Dorothy Angell	403	10.0	N/A
Rejected ballots		25	0.6	N/A
Majority		93	10.5	N/A
Turnout		4,033	45.1	N/A
Labour win (new seat)				
Community Action win (new seat)				
Community Action win (new seat)				

Hindley Green
Party	Candidate	Votes	%	±%
Labour	William Simmons	1,272	35.0	N/A
Community Action	Robert Brierley	1,264	34.8	N/A
Community Action	Barry Fagan	1,231		
Labour	Gordon Jackson	898		
Labour	John Phillips	895		
Community Action	Adele Wilkes	750		
Independent	John Vickers	583	16.0	N/A
Conservative	Andre Walker	489	13.5	N/A
Rejected ballots		25	0.7	N/A
Majority		333	0.2	N/A
Turnout		3,633	42.0	N/A
Labour win (new seat)				
Community Action win (new seat)				
Community Action win (new seat)				

Ince
Party	Candidate	Votes	%	±%
Labour	David Molyneux	1,494	66.5	N/A
Labour	Joan Hurst	1,368		
Labour	James Moodie	1,132		
Community Action	Constantine Winstanley	694	30.9	N/A
Community Action	Robert Hall	667		
Community Action	David Hall	651		
Rejected ballots		59	2.6	N/A
Majority		438	35.6	N/A
Turnout		2,247	26.3	N/A
Labour win (new seat)				
Labour win (new seat)				
Labour win (new seat)				

Leigh East
Party	Candidate	Votes	%	±%
Labour	Keith Cunliffe	1,407	46.5	N/A
Labour	Brian Jarvis	1,299		
Labour	Frederick Walker	1,081		
Community Action	Stuart Winstanley	943	31.2	N/A
Community Action	Peter O'Connell	843		
Conservative	Derek Davies	644	21.3	N/A
Community Action	Natalie Franzen	595		
Rejected ballots		30	1.0	N/A
Majority		138	15.3	N/A
Turnout		3,024	34.1	N/A
Labour win (new seat)				
Labour win (new seat)				
Labour win (new seat)				

Leigh South
Party	Candidate	Votes	%	±%
Labour	Keith Anderson	1,547	40.6	N/A
Labour	John O'Brien	1,465		
Labour	Charles Rigby	1,429		
Community Action	Stephen Ellison	1,175	30.9	N/A
Community Action	Janice Solinas	1,094		
Community Action	Irene Franzen	1,041		
Conservative	Andrew Oxley	1,030	27.1	N/A
Rejected ballots		54	1.4	N/A
Majority		254	9.8	N/A
Turnout		3,806	37.2	N/A
Labour win (new seat)				
Labour win (new seat)				
Labour win (new seat)				

Leigh West
Party	Candidate	Votes	%	±%
Labour	Barbara Jarvis	1,708	58.1	N/A
Labour	Myra Whiteside	1,624		
Labour	Peter Smith	1,506		
Community Action	Daniel Burrows	669	22.7	N/A
Community Action	Yvonne Lavelle	549		
BNP	Richard Close	513	17.4	N/A
Community Action	Ian Franzen	508		
Rejected ballots		51	1.7	N/A
Majority		837	35.3	N/A
Turnout		2,941	27.7	N/A
Labour win (new seat)				
Labour win (new seat)				
Labour win (new seat)				

Lowton East
Party	Candidate	Votes	%	±%
Community Action	Ian Franzen	1,793	44.6	N/A
Community Action	Jonathan Miller	1,730		
Community Action	James Lavelle	1,516		
Labour	Lynne Liptrot	1,289	32.0	N/A
Labour	Eric Waterworth	1,179		
Labour	Christine Cottam	1,062		
Conservative	James Grundy	879	21.8	N/A
Conservative	Jeanette Leigh	792		
Conservative	Alan Lowe	647		
Rejected ballots		63	1.6	N/A
Majority		227	12.5	N/A
Turnout		4,024	40.9	N/A
Community Action win (new seat)				
Community Action win (new seat)				
Community Action win (new seat)				

Orrell
Party	Candidate	Votes	%	±%
Conservative	Richard Clayton	1,747	39.4	N/A
Conservative	Michael Winstanley	1,520		
Labour	Ernest Swift	1,402	31.6	N/A
Labour	Michael Barnes	1,381		
Labour	Rodney Stockwell	1,313		
Conservative	Hazel Shields	1,285		
BNP	Charles Mather	671	15.1	N/A
Community Action	Alan Freeman	595	13.4	N/A
Community Action	Tracy Lavelle	420		
Community Action	Sean Ashdown	395		
Rejected ballots		19	0.4	N/A
Majority		117	7.8	N/A
Turnout		4,434	49.5	N/A
Conservative win (new seat)				
Conservative win (new seat)				
Labour win (new seat)				

Pemberton
Party	Candidate	Votes	%	±%
Labour	Jeanette Prescott	1,419	46.7	N/A
Labour	Barbara Bourne	1,381		
Labour	Paul Prescott	1,314		
Community Action	Margaret Crank	1,140	37.5	N/A
Community Action	William Burrows	1,096		
Community Action	John Hulme	1,025		
Conservative	Jonathan Cartwright	439	14.5	N/A
Rejected ballots		38	1.3	N/A
Majority		174	9.2	N/A
Turnout		3,036	31.1	N/A
Labour win (new seat)				
Labour win (new seat)				
Labour win (new seat)				

Shevington with Lower Ground
Party	Candidate	Votes	%	±%
Labour	John O'Neill	1,843	45.3	N/A
Labour	David Brown	1,468		
Labour	Michael Crosby	1,461		
Conservative	Elizabeth Beasleigh	1,456	35.8	N/A
Conservative	Deborah Fairhurst	1,288		
Conservative	Barry Alder	1,191		
Liberal Democrats	Martin Sutton	739	18.2	N/A
Liberal Democrats	Freda Graham	664		
Liberal Democrats	Solveiq Gaber	607		
Rejected ballots		31	0.8	N/A
Majority		5	9.5	N/A
Turnout		4,069	44.0	N/A
Labour win (new seat)				
Labour win (new seat)				
Labour win (new seat)				

Standish with Langtree
Party	Candidate	Votes	%	±%
Labour	George Davies	1,383	34.7	N/A
Conservative	George Fairhurst	1,325	33.2	N/A
Conservative	Jessica Downer	1,278		
Liberal Democrats	Raymond Murphy	1,254	31.4	N/A
Liberal Democrats	Trevor Beswick	1,202		
Labour	Thomas Morris	1,197		
Conservative	Barry Woolley	1,185		
Liberal Democrats	Maureen Garner	1,066		
Labour	Michael McLoughlin	953		
Rejected ballots		29	0.7	N/A
Majority		24	1.5	N/A
Turnout		3,991	42.5	N/A
Labour win (new seat)				
Conservative win (new seat)				
Conservative win (new seat)				

Tyldesley
Party	Candidate	Votes	%	±%
Liberal Democrats	Neil Hogg	2,212	54.7	N/A
Liberal Democrats	Keith McManus	1,976		
Liberal Democrats	Richard Derricutt	1,768		
Labour	Stephen Hellier	1,350	33.4	N/A
Labour	David Boydell	1,212		
Labour	Richard Evans	1,027		
Conservative	Deborah Woodcock	457	11.3	N/A
Rejected ballots		23	0.6	N/A
Majority		418	21.3	N/A
Turnout		4,042	40.1	N/A
Liberal Democrats win (new seat)				
Liberal Democrats win (new seat)				
Liberal Democrats win (new seat)				

Wigan Central
Party	Candidate	Votes	%	±%
Conservative	Henry Cadman	2,130	54.1	N/A
Conservative	James Davies	2,089		
Conservative	Gareth Fairhurst	1,961		
Labour	Richard Walsh	1,694	43.0	N/A
Labour	Susan Turner	1,668		
Labour	John Ball	1,502		
Rejected ballots		116	2.9	N/A
Majority		267	11.1	N/A
Turnout		3,940	43.2	N/A
Conservative win (new seat)				
Conservative win (new seat)				
Conservative win (new seat)				

Wigan West
Party	Candidate	Votes	%	±%
Labour	Terence Halliwell	Uncontested	N/A	N/A
Labour	Joe Shaw	Uncontested	N/A	N/A
Labour	David Willis	Uncontested	N/A	N/A
Labour win (new seat)				
Labour win (new seat)				
Labour win (new seat)				

Winstanley
Party	Candidate	Votes	%	±%
Community Action	Stanley Barnes	1,810	48.3	N/A
Labour	Rona Winkworth	1,393	37.2	N/A
Community Action	William Wilkes	1,330		
Community Action	Ronald Barnes	1,299		
Labour	Philip Kelly	1,000		
Labour	Robin Atkinson	993		
Conservative	Matthew Sephton	525	14.0	N/A
Rejected ballots		16	0.4	N/A
Majority		330	11.1	N/A
Turnout		3,744	42.6	N/A
Community Action win (new seat)				
Labour win (new seat)				
Community Action win (new seat)				

Worsley Mesnes
Party	Candidate	Votes	%	±%
Labour	Joseph Baldwin	1,547	48.9	N/A
Labour	William Rotherham	1,540		
Labour	Wilfred Brogan	1,498		
Community Action	Susan Barnes	1,171	37.0	N/A
Community Action	William Barnes	1,115		
Community Action	Stephen Wilkes	966		
Conservative	Thomas Sutton	424	13.4	N/A
Rejected ballots		24	0.8	N/A
Majority		327	11.9	N/A
Turnout		3,166	36.0	N/A
Labour win (new seat)				
Labour win (new seat)				
Labour win (new seat)				

== By-elections between 2004 and 2006 ==
Douglas By-Election 16 June 2005
Party	Candidate	Votes	%	±%
Labour	Michael Dewhurst	916	48.5	−2.8
Community Action	Robert Beale	788	41.8	−4.8
Conservative	Jean Peet	101	5.4	+5.4
BNP	Dennis Shambley	47	2.5	+2.5
UKIP	Gregory Atherton	35	1.9	+1.9
Majority		128	6.7	+2.0
Turnout		1,887	20.4	−9.8
Labour hold		Swing	+1.0	
