= 2010 Wigan Metropolitan Borough Council election =

2010 UK local government election

Map of the results of the 2010 Wigan council election. Labour in red and Liberal Democrats in yellow.

Elections to Wigan Council were held on 6 May 2010. One-third of the council was up for election.

== Election result ==
Wigan local election result 2010
Party	Seats	Gains	Losses	Net gain/loss	Seats %	Votes %	Votes	+/−
Labour	24	10	0	+10	96.0	45.5	63,404	+8.2%
Liberal Democrats	1	0	1	-1	4.0	8.9	12,447	+0.3%
Conservative	0	0	2	-2	0.0	18.7	26,036	-7.3%
Community Action	0	0	2	-2	0.0	8.0	11,129	-5.9%
Independent	0	0	3	-3	0.0	7.3	10,254	-1.6%
BNP	0	0	0	0	0.0	6.5	9,116	+3.2%
Ind. Conservative	0	0	2	-2	0.0	3.1	4,351	+3.1%
UKIP	0	0	0	0	0.0	1.3	1,797	-0.0%
England First	0	0	0	0	0.0	0.1	134	+0.1%

This result had the following consequences for the total number of seats on the council after the elections:

Party	Previous council	New council
Labour	41	51
Conservative	10	8
Independent	10	7
Community Action	6	4
Liberal Democrat	4	3
Wigan Independent Conservative	4	2
BNP	0	0
UKIP	0	0
England First	0	0
Total	75	75
Working majority	7	27

== Ward results ==
=== Abram ===
Abram
Party	Candidate	Votes	%	±%
Labour	Carl Sweeney	2,849	52.7	+4.9
Independent	Sandra Atherton	893	16.5	+16.5
Conservative	Marie Winstanley	668	12.4	−2.7
BNP	Dennis Shambley	659	12.2	+12.2
Community Action	John Shale	316	5.8	−30.9
Rejected ballots		20	0.4	-0.1
Majority		1,956	36.2	+25.2
Turnout		5,405	51.8	+26.7
Labour hold		Swing	-5.8	

=== Ashton ===
Ashton
Party	Candidate	Votes	%	±%
Labour	Dennis Ash	2,208	38.7	+5.1
Community Action	Joanne Bradley	1,980	34.7	−18.6
Independent	Frank Merry	574	10.1	+10.1
Conservative	Malcolm Childs	571	10.0	+2.5
BNP	Barry Longstaffe	352	6.2	+0.8
Rejected ballots		20	0.4	+0.1
Majority		228	4.0	−15.8
Turnout		5,705	63.1	+26.2
Labour hold		Swing	+11.8	

=== Aspull, New Springs, Whelley ===
Aspull, New Springs, Whelley
Party	Candidate	Votes	%	±%
Labour	Ronald Conway	3,133	49.6	+6.6
Liberal Democrats	Trevor Beswick	1,470	23.3	−14.1
Conservative	Jane Surples	1,175	18.6	−0.5
BNP	Andrew Jones	430	6.8	+6.8
Ind. Conservative	Ian Bland	90	1.4	+1.4
Rejected ballots		20	0.3	-0.2
Majority		1,663	26.3	+20.7
Turnout		6,318	64.1	+29.7
Labour gain from Liberal Democrats		Swing	+10.3	

=== Astley Mosley Common ===
Astley Mosley Common
Party	Candidate	Votes	%	±%
Labour	Barry Taylor	2,339	39.5	+4.2
Liberal Democrats	Gavin Clements	1,894	32.0	+10.0
Conservative	Nasri Barghothi	1,635	27.6	−14.4
Rejected ballots		47	0.8	+0.2
Majority		445	7.5	+0.8
Turnout		5,915	63.1	+32.2
Labour gain from Independent		Swing	-2.9	

=== Atherleigh ===
Atherleigh
Party	Candidate	Votes	%	±%
Labour	Pamela Stewart	2,038	43.3	−15.4
Conservative	Derek Davies	871	18.5	−21.9
Liberal Democrats	Lisa Clements	711	15.1	+15.1
Independent	Neil Wade	447	9.5	+9.5
BNP	Gary Chadwick	386	8.2	+8.2
Community Action	Julie Finch	254	5.4	+5.4
Rejected ballots		0	0.0	-0.9
Majority		1,167	24.8	+6.5
Turnout		4,707	56.0	+29.6
Labour hold		Swing	+3.2	

=== Atherton ===
Atherton
Party	Candidate	Votes	%	±%
Labour	Karen Aldred	2,758	45.2	+19.3
Conservative	Vivienne Lee	961	15.7	+2.9
Independent	Jamie Hodgkinson	852	14.0	−15.5
Liberal Democrats	Gareth Clements	850	13.9	−10.9
Community Action	Stephen Hall	655	10.7	+10.7
Rejected ballots		30	0.5	+0.1
Majority		1,797	29.4	+25.8
Turnout		6,106	57.0	+25.6
Labour hold		Swing	+8.2	

=== Bryn ===
Bryn
Party	Candidate	Votes	%	±%
Labour	Margaret Rampling	2,274	40.2	+16.7
Independent	Brian Merry	1,697	30.0	−19.2
Community Action	Kevin Williams	609	10.8	−1.3
BNP	Ken Haslam	531	9.4	+0.7
Conservative	Joseph Sheedy	525	9.3	+3.0
Rejected ballots		25	0.4	+0.0
Majority		577	10.2	−15.6
Turnout		5,661	62.4	+26.3
Labour gain from Independent		Swing	+17.9	

=== Douglas ===
Douglas
Party	Candidate	Votes	%	±%
Labour	Shirley Dewhurst	2,742	58.7	+7.3
Conservative	Margaret Atherton	659	14.1	−1.3
BNP	Ian Lloyd	461	9.9	+9.9
Community Action	Jayne Bryan	396	8.5	−24.2
Independent	Anthony Unsworth	380	8.1	+8.1
Rejected ballots		34	0.7	+0.2
Majority		2,083	44.6	+25.9
Turnout		4,672	48.9	+24.4
Labour hold		Swing	+4.3	

=== Golborne Lowton West ===
Golborne Lowton West
Party	Candidate	Votes	%	±%
Labour	Gerard Bretherton	2,554	49.9	+8.9
Community Action	Peter Franzen	1,431	28.0	−10.4
Conservative	Kathleen Houlton	775	15.2	+5.4
BNP	Steven McEllenborough	329	6.4	+0.3
Rejected ballots		26	0.5	+0.3
Majority		1,123	22.0	+19.4
Turnout		5,115	58.0	+25.1
Labour hold		Swing	+9.6	

=== Hindley ===
Hindley
Party	Candidate	Votes	%	±%
Labour	James Talbot	2,558	49.2	+24.7
Independent	David Culshaw	1,346	25.9	−39.6
Conservative	David Ollerton	610	11.7	+2.0
BNP	Stephen Bradbury	501	9.6	+9.6
Community Action	Peter Solinas	152	2.9	+2.9
Rejected ballots		28	0.5	+0.3
Majority		1,212	23.3	−17.7
Turnout		5,195	52.7	+23.6
Labour hold		Swing	+32.1	

=== Hindley Green ===
Hindley Green
Party	Candidate	Votes	%	±%
Labour	David Stitt	1,658	31.5	+5.0
Independent	Francis Carmichael	1,476	28.0	−16.7
Community Action	Barry Fagan	1,087	20.6	+6.4
Conservative	Margaret Winstanley	593	11.3	−3.0
BNP	Darren Mark Taylor	427	8.1	+8.1
Rejected ballots		28	0.5	+0.1
Majority		182	3.5	−14.7
Turnout		5,269	61.7	+32.9
Labour gain from Community Action		Swing	+10.8	

=== Ince ===
Ince
Party	Candidate	Votes	%	±%
Labour	James Moodie	2,559	60.8	+0.3
BNP	James Harrison	570	13.5	+13.5
Conservative	Raymond Whittingham	402	9.6	−4.6
Community Action	Robert Hall	300	7.1	−17.4
Independent	Brian Kenrick	224	5.3	+5.3
England First	Robert Hague	134	3.2	+3.2
Rejected ballots		18	0.4	-0.3
Majority		1,989	47.3	+11.3
Turnout		4,207	48.3	+25.3
Labour hold		Swing	-6.6	

=== Leigh East ===
Leigh East
Party	Candidate	Votes	%	±%
Labour	Frederick Walker	2,422	48.2	+4.3
Liberal Democrats	Gordon Jackson	1,373	27.3	+0.9
Conservative	Richard Short	1,183	23.5	−5.5
Rejected ballots		51	1.0	+0.3
Majority		1,049	20.9	+6.1
Turnout		5,029	55.9	+31.0
Labour hold		Swing	+1.7	

=== Leigh South ===
Leigh South
Party	Candidate	Votes	%	±%
Labour	Charles Rigby	2,571	40.8	−0.4
Conservative	Stanley Walker	1,196	19.0	−11.1
Liberal Democrats	Chris Blackburn	1,002	15.9	+15.9
Community Action	Clive Charles	583	9.3	−5.0
BNP	Adam Lloyd	516	8.2	−5.9
Independent	Philip Symonds	279	4.4	+4.4
Ind. Conservative	Elaine Brown	125	2.0	+2.0
Rejected ballots		24	0.4	+0.1
Majority		1,375	21.8	+10.6
Turnout		6,296	61.6	+29.0
Labour hold		Swing	+5.3	

=== Leigh West ===
Leigh West
Party	Candidate	Votes	%	±%
Labour	Peter Smith	2,509	46.5	−17.8
Liberal Democrats	Richard Derricutt	828	15.3	+15.3
BNP	Martin Grainey	693	12.8	+12.8
Conservative	John Oxley	557	10.3	−23.7
Independent	David Hull	280	5.2	+5.2
Independent	Brian Turrell	255	4.7	+4.7
UKIP	Mary Lavelle	247	4.6	+4.6
Rejected ballots		28	0.5	-1.1
Majority		1,681	31.1	+0.8
Turnout		5,397	51.3	+28.5
Labour hold		Swing	-16.5	

=== Lowton East ===
Lowton East
Party	Candidate	Votes	%	±%
Labour	James Cowley	2,403	38.0	+17.4
Conservative	Ed Houlton	2,315	36.6	−17.0
Community Action	Ian Franzen	1,591	25.1	−0.5
Rejected ballots		18	0.3	+0.1
Majority		88	1.4	−26.6
Turnout		6,327	65.6	+27.7
Labour gain from Community Action		Swing	+17.2	

=== Orrell ===
Orrell
Party	Candidate	Votes	%	±%
Labour	David Arrowsmith	2,877	46.1	+18.1
Conservative	Stuart Foy	2,317	37.2	−9.3
BNP	Charles Foy	697	11.2	−4.7
Ind. Conservative	Paula Thompson	286	4.6	+4.6
Rejected ballots		58	0.9	+0.6
Majority		560	9.0	−9.5
Turnout		6,235	67.5	+29.7
Labour gain from Conservative		Swing	+13.7	

=== Pemberton ===
Pemberton
Party	Candidate	Votes	%	±%
Labour	Paul Prescott	3,219	65.5	+9.8
Conservative	Jonathan Cartwright	617	12.6	−1.5
BNP	Christopher Hilton	596	12.1	−1.3
Community Action	Michael Leyland	451	9.2	−7.1
Rejected ballots		32	0.7	+0.1
Majority		2,602	52.9	+13.5
Turnout		4,915	50.1	+24.2
Labour hold		Swing	+5.6	

=== Shevington with Lower Ground ===
Shevington with Lower Ground
Party	Candidate	Votes	%	±%
Labour	Michael Crosby	2,180	34.3	+3.6
Conservative	Anthony Hind	1,404	22.1	−26.3
Ind. Conservative	Angela Bland	1,210	19.1	+19.1
Liberal Democrats	Daniel Clarke	995	15.7	+7.7
UKIP	John Atherton	534	8.4	+0.5
Rejected ballots		28	0.4	+0.4
Majority		776	12.2	−5.5
Turnout		6,351	68.3	+34.2
Labour gain from Ind. Conservative		Swing	+14.9	

=== Standish with Langtree ===
Standish with Langtree
Party	Candidate	Votes	%	±%
Labour	Emma McGurrin	2,097	32.1	+1.2
Conservative	Steven Surples	1,894	29.0	−21.8
Ind. Conservative	Neil Dunlop	1,021	15.6	+15.6
Liberal Democrats	Alan Robinson	1,009	15.4	+9.1
UKIP	Alan Freeman	280	4.3	−4.1
BNP	Graham Lawrence	228	3.5	+3.5
Rejected ballots		13	0.2	+0.1
Majority		203	3.1	−16.8
Turnout		6,542	68.4	+32.8
Labour gain from Conservative		Swing	+11.5	

=== Tyldesley ===
Tyldesley
Party	Candidate	Votes	%	±%
Liberal Democrats	Paul Valentine	2,315	39.5	−26.2
Labour	Anita Thorpe	1,875	32.0	+10.0
Conservative	Hilary Hayden	930	15.9	+4.6
BNP	David Peacock	450	7.7	+7.7
Independent	Joseph Haley	272	4.6	+4.6
Rejected ballots		13	0.2	-0.8
Majority		440	7.5	−36.2
Turnout		5,855	58.3	+30.5
Liberal Democrats hold		Swing	-18.1	

=== Wigan Central ===
Wigan Central
Party	Candidate	Votes	%	±%
Labour	George Davies	2,477	41.9	+11.6
Conservative	Robert Gibson	1,522	25.7	−24.5
Ind. Conservative	Gareth Fairhurst	1,090	18.4	+18.4
UKIP	Keith Jones	475	8.0	−4.1
BNP	Anthony Farrell	306	5.2	+5.2
Rejected ballots		47	0.8	+0.3
Majority		955	16.1	−3.9
Turnout		5,917	64.8	+30.5
Labour gain from Ind. Conservative		Swing	+18.0	

=== Wigan West ===
Wigan West
Party	Candidate	Votes	%	±%
Labour	Phyllis Cullen	3,437	61.4	+17.7
Conservative	Christopher McGowan	970	17.3	−1.6
BNP	Susan Mather	608	10.9	−3.6
Ind. Conservative	Andrew Lomax	529	9.5	+9.5
Rejected ballots		50	0.9	+0.7
Majority		2,467	44.1	+19.3
Turnout		5,594	57.5	+32.4
Labour hold		Swing	+9.6	

=== Winstanley ===
Winstanley
Party	Candidate	Votes	%	±%
Labour	Clive Morgan	2,465	43.4	+10.1
Independent	William Wilkes	1,279	22.5	+22.5
Conservative	Victoria Ashurst	852	15.0	−4.4
Community Action	Ronald Barnes	433	7.6	−39.3
BNP	Adrian Jones	376	6.6	+6.6
UKIP	Arnold Foster	261	4.6	+4.6
Rejected ballots		14	0.2	-0.1
Majority		1,186	20.9	+7.2
Turnout		5,680	64.8	+35.0
Labour gain from Independent		Swing	-6.2	

=== Worsley Mesnes ===
Worsley Mesnes
Party	Candidate	Votes	%	±%
Labour	Lynne Holland	3,202	64.5	+9.4
Community Action	Arthur Fairhurst	891	17.9	−10.6
Conservative	Marion Green	834	16.8	+1.1
Rejected ballots		38	0.8	+0.1
Majority		2,311	46.5	+20.0
Turnout		4,965	56.2	+29.9
Labour hold		Swing	+10.0	

== By-elections between 2010 and 2011 ==
Wigan Central By-Election 3 March 2011
Party	Candidate	Votes	%	±%
Labour	Lawrence Hunt	1,165	48.6	+6.7
Conservative	Robin Gibson	652	27.2	+1.5
Ind. Conservative	Gareth Fairhurst	393	16.4	−2.0
UKIP	Keith Davies	189	7.9	−0.1
Majority		513	21.4	+5.3
Turnout		2,399	25.6	−39.2
Labour gain from Conservative		Swing	+2.6	
