= 2007 Wigan Metropolitan Borough Council election =

Map of the results of the 2007 Wigan council election. Labour in red, Conservatives in blue, Community Action Party in green, Liberal Democrats in yellow and independent in grey.

Elections to Wigan Council were held on 3 May 2007 with one third of the seats up for election.

== Election result ==
Wigan local election result 2007
Party	Seats	Gains	Losses	Net gain/loss	Seats %	Votes %	Votes	+/−
Labour	16	4	1	+3	64.0	43.2	30,854	+0.4%
Conservative	4	1	0	+1	16.0	21.0	15,023	-0.7%
Community Action	3	1	2	-1	12.0	15.8	11,265	-1.0%
Liberal Democrats	1	0	2	-2	4.0	10.1	7,211	-1.7%
Independent	1	0	0	0	4.0	3.2	2,267	+2.0%
BNP	0	0	0	0	0	3.6	2,572	+0.8%
Community Performance First	0	0	1	-1	0	1.2	837	+1.2%
Green	0	0	0	0	0	1.2	835	+0.3%
UKIP	0	0	0	0	0	0.5	337	-1.1%

This result had the following consequences for the total number of seats on the council after the elections:

Party	Previous council	New council
Labour	43	46
Community Action	12	11
Conservative	9	10
Liberal Democrat	8	6
Independent	2	2
BNP	0	0
Green	0	0
Community Performance First	1	0
UKIP	0	0
Total	75	75
Working majority	11	17

== Ward results ==
Abram
Party	Candidate	Votes	%	±%
Labour	Eunice Smethurst	1,403	55.0	+2.9
Community Action	John Shale	587	22.2	+1.0
BNP	Dennis Shambley	309	12.1	−4.4
Conservative	Marion Green	264	10.4	+0.8
Rejected ballots		6	0.2	-0.3
Majority		836	32.8	+1.9
Turnout		2,549	24.8	−0.2
Labour hold		Swing	+0.9	

Ashton
Party	Candidate	Votes	%	±%
Community Action	Walter Carney	1,423	45.4	+2.2
Labour	Ann Rampling	1,258	40.1	−5.2
Conservative	Marie Winstanley	256	8.2	−3.3
BNP	Violet Haslam	195	6.2	+6.2
Rejected ballots		5	0.2	+0.2
Majority		165	5.3	+3.1
Turnout		3,137	34.4	+4.1
Community Action hold		Swing	+3.7	

Aspull, New Springs, Whelley
Party	Candidate	Votes	%	±%
Labour	Chris Ready	1,888	53.1	+12.8
Liberal Democrats	Alan Robinson	1,017	28.6	−15.2
Conservative	Jim Waterworth	463	13.0	−2.8
Green	Norma Stout	174	4.9	+4.9
Rejected ballots		13	0.4	+0.4
Majority		871	24.5	+21.0
Turnout		3,555	35.6	+3.7
Labour hold		Swing	+14.0	

Astley, Mosley Common
Party	Candidate	Votes	%	±%
Labour	Brendan Bowen	1,048	37.9	+9.2
Conservative	Sean Ell	821	29.7	+7.3
Liberal Democrats	Peter Bowdler	665	24.0	−24.8
Green	Ian Davies	218	7.9	+7.9
Rejected ballots		14	0.5	+0.5
Majority		227	8.2	−12.0
Turnout		2,766	28.6	−2.5
Labour gain from Liberal Democrats		Swing	+0.9	

Atherleigh
Party	Candidate	Votes	%	±%
Labour	Mark Aldred	1,104	52.1	+6.1
Liberal Democrats	Kevin Jones	640	30.2	−4.1
Conservative	Dorothy Angell	366	17.3	−2.4
Rejected ballots		10	0.5	+0.5
Majority		464	21.9	+10.2
Turnout		2,120	26.8	+0.9
Labour hold		Swing	+5.1	

Atherton
Party	Candidate	Votes	%	±%
Labour	Norman Bradbury	1,456	45.3	−4.4
Liberal Democrats	David Higginbottom	1,211	37.7	+6.0
Conservative	Lee Kendrick-Walker	352	11.0	+0.0
Green	Nicolas Redmond	183	5.7	−2.0
Rejected ballots		10	0.3	+0.3
Majority		245	7.6	−10.4
Turnout		3,212	29.5	+1.9
Labour gain from Liberal Democrats		Swing	-5.2	

Bryn
Party	Candidate	Votes	%	±%
Independent	Gary Wilkes	1,657	52.3	+52.3
Labour	George Harrison	1,030	32.3	−0.9
BNP	Kenneth Haslam	307	9.6	−4.8
Conservative	Jonathan Cartwright	179	5.6	+0.2
Rejected ballots		7	0.2	+0.0
Majority		637	20.0	+8.0
Turnout		3,190	34.3	+0.6
Independent hold		Swing	+26.6	

Douglas
Party	Candidate	Votes	%	±%
Labour	Mike Dewhurst	1,338	58.0	−1.1
Community Action	James Carmichael-Prince	586	25.4	−14.9
Conservative	Jean Peet	374	16.2	+16.2
Rejected ballots		10	0.4	-0.2
Majority		752	32.6	+13.8
Turnout		2,308	24.4	−0.4
Labour hold		Swing	+6.9	

Golborne and Lowton West
Party	Candidate	Votes	%	±%
Labour	Mark Klieve	1,520	56.4	+4.4
Community Action	Kevin Williams	777	28.8	−6.3
Conservative	James Grundy	388	14.4	+1.6
Rejected ballots		11	0.4	+0.4
Majority		743	27.6	+10.7
Turnout		2,696	30.3	−0.4
Labour gain from Community Action		Swing	+5.3	

Hindley
Party	Candidate	Votes	%	±%
Labour	James Ecclles-Churton	1,191	45.3	−3.1
Community Action	Jim Ellis	1,142	43.4	+7.1
Conservative	William Winstanley	289	11.0	−4.4
Rejected ballots		9	0.3	+0.3
Majority		49	1.9	−10.2
Turnout		2,631	26.6	+1.1
Labour gain from Community Action		Swing	-5.1	

Hindley Green
Party	Candidate	Votes	%	±%
Community Action	Louise Fagan	741	31.4	−16.0
Labour	Martin Long	710	30.1	−5.8
Community Performance First	Robert Brierley	654	27.7	+27.7
Conservative	Margaret Winstanley	245	10.4	−6.3
Rejected ballots		8	0.3	+0.3
Majority		31	1.3	−10.3
Turnout		2,358	26.4	+0.6
Community Action gain from Community Performance First		Swing	-5.1	

Ince
Party	Candidate	Votes	%	±%
Labour	Joan Hurst	1,348	66.5	+5.7
Community Action	Yvonne Maddison	458	22.6	−7.8
Conservative	Anthony Hinds	210	10.4	+2.1
Rejected ballots		12	0.6	-0.1
Majority		890	43.9	+13.5
Turnout		2,028	23.6	−1.0
Labour hold		Swing	+6.7	

Leigh East
Party	Candidate	Votes	%	±%
Labour	Christine Cottam	1,204	48.1	+2.1
Liberal Democrats	Gordon Jackson	778	31.1	−6.4
Conservative	Andrew Oxley	501	20.0	+3.6
Rejected ballots		18	0.7	+0.7
Majority		426	17.0	+8.5
Turnout		2,501	27.0	+0.2
Labour hold		Swing	+4.2	

Leigh South
Party	Candidate	Votes	%	±%
Labour	John O'Brien	1,408	43.3	+3.5
Community Action	Ian Franzen	774	23.8	+4.4
Conservative	Rosina Oxley	762	23.4	−0.4
BNP	Richard Close	293	9.0	−5.0
Rejected ballots		15	0.5	+0.5
Majority		634	19.5	+3.5
Turnout		3,252	31.1	+0.5
Labour hold		Swing	-0.4	

Leigh West
Party	Candidate	Votes	%	±%
Labour	Myra Whiteside	1,380	53.9	−1.0
Independent	Mandy Cooper	600	23.5	+23.5
Conservative	Denise Young	289	11.3	−5.0
Community Action	Stephen Ellison	280	10.9	+10.9
Rejected ballots		9	0.4	+0.4
Majority		780	30.5	+4.3
Turnout		2,558	23.8	+0.4
Labour hold		Swing	-12.2	

Lowton East
Party	Candidate	Votes	%	±%
Community Action	Jonathan Miller	1,418	43.0	+8.9
Labour	Susan Greensmith	1,085	32.9	+0.1
Conservative	Jeanette Leigh	782	23.7	−9.3
Rejected ballots		13	0.4	+0.4
Majority		636	10.1	+9.0
Turnout		3,298	33.6	+1.4
Community Action hold		Swing	+4.4	

Orrell
Party	Candidate	Votes	%	±%
Conservative	Michael Winstanley	1,686	45.2	+6.8
Labour	Michael Barnes	1,328	35.6	−1.6
BNP	Charles Mather	534	14.3	−3.9
Community Action	Peter Solinas	165	4.4	+4.4
Rejected ballots		13	0.3	+0.3
Majority		358	9.6	+8.4
Turnout		3,726	40.3	+3.2
Conservative hold		Swing	+4.2	

Pemberton
Party	Candidate	Votes	%	±%
Labour	Barbara Bourne	1,421	57.6	−7.1
Community Action	Michael Leyland	409	16.6	+2.3
BNP	Chris Hilton	333	13.5	+13.5
Conservative	Stuart Foy	295	12.0	+12.0
Rejected ballots		8	0.3	+0.3
Majority		1,012	41.0	−9.5
Turnout		2,466	24.9	+2.2
Labour hold		Swing	-4.7	

Shevington with Lower Ground
Party	Candidate	Votes	%	±%
Conservative	Debbie Fairhurst	1,377	41.9	−15.5
Labour	Dave Brown	1,248	38.0	−3.2
UKIP	John Atherton	337	10.3	+10.3
Liberal Democrats	Darren Atherton	311	9.5	+9.5
Rejected ballots		11	0.3	-1.1
Majority		129	3.9	−12.3
Turnout		3,284	34.9	+1.1
Conservative gain from Labour		Swing	-6.1	

Standish with Langtree
Party	Candidate	Votes	%	±%
Conservative	George Fairhurst	2,016	57.9	+3.1
Labour	Mike Crosby	996	28.6	−1.6
Liberal Democrats	June Garner	451	12.9	+12.9
Rejected ballots		20	0.6	+0.1
Majority		1,020	29.3	+4.7
Turnout		3,483	36.4	+0.4
Conservative hold		Swing	+2.3	

Tyldesley
Party	Candidate	Votes	%	±%
Liberal Democrats	Keith McManus	1,838	63.0	+4.3
Labour	Pamela Stewart	447	15.3	−4.0
Conservative	Hilary Hayden	370	12.7	+3.6
Green	Craig Cohen	260	8.9	−4.0
Rejected ballots		3	0.1	+0.1
Majority		1,391	47.7	+8.3
Turnout		2,918	28.6	−0.3
Liberal Democrats hold		Swing	+4.2	

Wigan Central
Party	Candidate	Votes	%	±%
Conservative	Jim Davies	1,406	44.2	−15.8
Labour	John Ball	1,050	33.0	−7.0
Liberal Democrats	Martin Sutton	300	9.4	+9.4
Community Action	Ronnie Barnes	218	6.9	+6.9
BNP	Gary Chadwick	199	6.3	+6.3
Rejected ballots		9	0.3	+0.3
Majority		356	11.2	−8.8
Turnout		3,182	34.6	+0.1
Conservative hold		Swing	-4.4	

Wigan West
Party	Candidate	Votes	%	±%
Labour	Mike Baines	1,388	47.5	−1.5
Conservative	Keith Jones	563	19.3	−2.9
Community Action	Philip Parkes	560	19.2	+19.2
BNP	Susan Mather	402	13.7	+13.7
Rejected ballots		11	0.4	-0.2
Majority		825	28.2	+7.6
Turnout		2,924	28.6	+1.7
Labour hold		Swing	+0.7	

Winstanley
Party	Candidate	Votes	%	±%
Labour	Rona Winkworth	1,224	43.3	+9.4
Community Action	Leanne Brotherton	1,109	39.2	−4.2
Conservative	David Bowker	482	17.1	+2.7
Rejected ballots		11	0.4	+0.1
Majority		115	4.1	−5.5
Turnout		2,826	32.0	+1.9
Labour hold		Swing	+6.8	

Worsley Mesnes
Party	Candidate	Votes	%	±%
Labour	William Rotherham	1,381	55.3	−0.1
Community Action	William Barnes	638	25.5	−5.5
Conservative	Thomas Sutton	287	11.5	−1.4
Community Performance First	Anthony Unsworth	183	7.3	+7.3
Rejected ballots		9	0.4	-0.3
Majority		743	29.7	+5.4
Turnout		2,498	27.6	+1.6
Labour hold		Swing	+2.7	

== By-elections between 2007 and 2008 ==
Tyldesley By-Election 28 June 2007
Party	Candidate	Votes	%	±%
Liberal Democrats	Robert Bleakley	784	40.2	−22.8
Labour	Barry Taylor	619	31.7	+16.4
Independent	Craig Cohen	377	19.3	+19.3
Conservative	Sean Ell	170	8.7	−4.0
Majority		165	8.5	−39.2
Turnout		1,950	19.2	−9.4
Liberal Democrats hold		Swing	-19.6	

Wigan West By-Election 20 September 2007
Party	Candidate	Votes	%	±%
Labour	Phyll Cullen	837	43.7	−3.8
Liberal Democrats	Trevor Beswick	464	24.2	+24.2
BNP	Susan Mather	264	13.8	+0.1
Community Action	Jim Carmichael-Prince	219	11.4	−7.8
Independent	Syd Hall	72	3.8	+3.8
Green	Norma Stout	60	3.1	+3.1
Majority		373	19.5	−8.7
Turnout		1,916	18.7	−9.9
Labour hold		Swing	-14.0	

Wigan Central By-Election 18 October 2007
Party	Candidate	Votes	%	±%
Conservative	Jean Peet	1,013	48.2	+4.0
Labour	Mike Barnes	827	39.3	+6.3
Community Action	John Shale	262	12.5	+5.6
Majority		186	8.9	−2.3
Turnout		2,102	22.8	−11.8
Conservative hold		Swing	-1.1	
