= 2008 Wigan Metropolitan Borough Council election =

2008 UK local government election

Map of the results of the 2008 Wigan council election. Labour in red, Conservatives in blue, independent in grey, Community Action Party in green and Liberal Democrats in yellow.

Elections to Wigan Metropolitan Borough Council were held on 1 May 2008. One-third of the council was up for election.

== Election result ==
Wigan local election result 2008
Party	Seats	Gains	Losses	Net gain/loss	Seats %	Votes %	Votes	+/−
Labour	12	1	5	-4	48.0	37.3	26,353	-5.9
Conservative	6	4	0	+4	24.0	26.0	18,360	+5.0
Independent	4	2	0	+2	16.0	8.9	6,260	+5.7
Community Action	2	0	2	-2	8.0	13.9	9,830	-1.9
Liberal Democrats	1	0	0	0	4.0	8.6	6,054	-1.5
BNP	0	0	0	0	0.0	3.3	2,352	-0.3
UKIP	0	0	0	0	0.0	1.3	912	+0.8
Respect	0	0	0	0	0.0	0.3	222	+0.3

This result had the following consequences for the total number of seats on the council after the elections:

Party	Previous council	New council
Labour	46	42
Conservative	10	14
Community Action	10	8
Independent	5	7
Liberal Democrat	4	4
BNP	0	0
UKIP	0	0
Respect	0	0
Total	75	75
Working majority	17	9

== Ward results ==
=== Abram ===
Abram
Party	Candidate	Votes	%	±%
Labour	Eddie Russon	1,226	47.8	−7.3
Community Action	John Shale	934	36.7	+14.5
Conservative	Marion Green	386	15.0	+4.7
Rejected ballots		11	0.4	+0.2
Majority		283	11.0	−21.8
Turnout		2,566	25.2	+0.4
Labour hold		Swing	-10.9	

=== Ashton ===
Ashton
Party	Candidate	Votes	%	±%
Community Action	Paul Tushingham	1,766	53.4	+8.0
Labour	Ann Rampling	1,111	33.6	−6.5
Conservative	Marie Winstanley	248	7.5	−0.7
BNP	Adrian Jones	178	5.4	−0.8
Rejected ballots		7	0.2	+0.1
Majority		655	19.8	+14.5
Turnout		3,310	36.9	+2.5
Community Action hold		Swing	+7.2	

=== Aspull New Springs Whelley ===
Aspull, New Springs, Whelley
Party	Candidate	Votes	%	±%
Labour	John Hilton	1,443	43.0	−10.1
Liberal Democrats	Alan Robinson	1,254	37.4	+8.8
Conservative	Anthony Hind	640	19.1	+6.1
Rejected ballots		17	0.5	+0.1
Majority		189	5.6	−18.9
Turnout		3,354	34.4	−1.2
Labour hold		Swing	-9.4	

=== Astley Mosley Common ===
Astley Mosley Common
Party	Candidate	Votes	%	±%
Conservative	Sean Ell	1,207	42.0	+12.3
Labour	Brian Wilson	1,014	35.3	−2.6
Liberal Democrats	Gavin Clements	684	22.1	−2.0
Rejected ballots		18	0.6	+0.1
Majority		193	6.7	−1.5
Turnout		2,873	30.9	+2.3
Conservative gain from Labour		Swing	+7.4	

=== Atherleigh ===
Atherleigh
Party	Candidate	Votes	%	±%
Labour	Susan Loudon	1,246	58.7	+6.6
Conservative	Abigail Solomon	858	40.4	+23.1
Rejected ballots		20	0.9	+0.5
Majority		388	18.3	−3.6
Turnout		2,124	26.4	−0.4
Labour hold		Swing	-8.2	

=== Atherton ===
Atherton
Party	Candidate	Votes	%	±%
Independent	Bob Splaine	976	29.5	+29.5
Labour	Elnur Yusifzade	858	25.8	−19.5
Liberal Democrats	David Higginbottom	821	24.8	−12.9
Conservative	Michael Nicholls	416	12.9	+1.9
Respect	Stephen Hall	221	6.7	+6.7
Rejected ballots		13	0.4	+0.1
Majority		120	3.6	−4.0
Turnout		3,314	31.4	+1.9
Independent hold		Swing	+24.5	

=== Bryn ===
Bryn
Party	Candidate	Votes	%	±%
Independent	Don Hodgkinson	1,606	49.2	−3.1
Labour	Helen Ash	765	23.4	−8.9
Community Action	Clive Charles	384	12.1	+12.1
BNP	Ken Haslam	284	8.7	−0.9
Conservative	Malcolm Childs	204	6.2	+0.6
Rejected ballots		13	0.4	+0.2
Majority		841	25.8	+5.8
Turnout		3,266	36.2	+1.9
Independent hold		Swing	+2.9	

=== Douglas ===
Douglas
Party	Candidate	Votes	%	±%
Labour	Joy Birch	1,170	51.4	−6.6
Community Action	Anthony Unsworth	745	32.7	+7.3
Conservative	Stephen Holt	350	15.4	−0.8
Rejected ballots		12	0.5	+0.1
Majority		425	18.7	−13.9
Turnout		2,277	24.6	+0.2
Labour hold		Swing	-6.9	

=== Golborne Lowton West ===
Golborne Lowton West
Party	Candidate	Votes	%	±%
Labour	Yvonne Klieve	1,186	41.0	−15.4
Community Action	Peter Franzen	1,110	38.4	+9.6
Conservative	John Oxley	282	9.8	−4.6
BNP	Steven McEllenborough	178	6.2	+6.2
Independent	Frank Davies	129	4.5	+4.5
Rejected ballots		7	0.2	-0.2
Majority		76	2.6	−25.0
Turnout		2,892	32.9	+2.5
Labour gain from Community Action		Swing	-12.5	

=== Hindley ===
Hindley
Party	Candidate	Votes	%	±%
Independent	Jim Ellis	1,347	47.4	+47.4
Labour	Marcia Dooley	694	24.5	−20.8
Independent	David Culshaw	515	18.1	+18.1
Conservative	Margaret Winstanley	277	9.7	−1.2
Rejected ballots		7	0.2	-0.1
Majority		1,166	41.0	+39.1
Turnout		2,842	29.1	+2.4
Independent gain from Labour		Swing	+34.1	

=== Hindley Green ===
Hindley Green
Party	Candidate	Votes	%	±%
Independent	Bob Brierley	1,105	44.7	+44.7
Labour	Martin Long	981	26.5	−3.6
Conservative	Stuart Foy	353	14.3	+3.9
Community Action	Rachel Fagan	351	14.2	−17.2
Rejected ballots		10	0.4	+0.1
Majority		450	18.2	+16.9
Turnout		2,474	28.9	+2.4
Independent gain from Labour		Swing	+24.1	

=== Ince ===
Ince
Party	Candidate	Votes	%	±%
Labour	David Molyneux	1,180	60.5	−5.9
Community Action	Syd Hall	479	24.6	+2.0
Conservative	Raymond Whittingham	275	14.1	+3.8
Rejected ballots		15	0.8	+0.2
Majority		701	36	−7.9
Turnout		1,949	23.0	−0.6
Labour hold		Swing	-3.9	

=== Leigh East ===
Leigh East
Party	Candidate	Votes	%	±%
Labour	Keith Cunliffe	981	43.8	−4.3
Conservative	Dorothy Angell	649	29.0	+9.0
Liberal Democrats	Gordon Jackson	597	26.4	−4.7
Rejected ballots		17	0.8	+0.0
Majority		332	14.8	−2.2
Turnout		2,238	24.8	−2.2
Labour hold		Swing	-6.6	

=== Leigh South ===
Leigh South
Party	Candidate	Votes	%	±%
Labour	Kevin Anderson	1,372	41.2	−2.1
Conservative	Andrew Oxley	1,000	30.1	+6.6
Community Action	Ian Franzen	476	14.3	−9.5
BNP	Gary Chadwick	470	14.1	+5.1
Rejected ballots		9	0.3	-0.2
Majority		372	11.2	−8.3
Turnout		3,327	32.6	+1.5
Labour hold		Swing	-4.3	

=== Leigh West ===
Leigh West
Party	Candidate	Votes	%	±%
Labour	Susan Greensmith	1,543	64.3	+10.3
Conservative	Denise Young	817	34.0	+22.7
Rejected ballots		40	1.7	+1.3
Majority		726	30.3	−0.2
Turnout		2,400	22.9	−0.9
Labour hold		Swing	-6.2	

=== Lowton East ===
Lowton East
Party	Candidate	Votes	%	±%
Conservative	James Grundy	1,972	53.6	+29.9
Community Action	Ian Franzen	943	25.6	−17.4
Labour	James Cowley	758	20.6	−12.3
Rejected ballots		8	0.2	-0.2
Majority		1,029	28.0	+17.9
Turnout		3,681	37.9	+4.3
Conservative gain from Community Action		Swing	+23.6	

=== Orrell ===
Orrell
Party	Candidate	Votes	%	±%
Conservative	Richard Clayton	1,608	46.5	+1.3
Labour	Mike Barnes	969	28.0	−7.6
BNP	Charles Mather	548	15.8	+1.5
Independent	Richard Clayton	321	9.3	+9.3
Rejected ballots		12	0.3	+0.0
Majority		639	18.5	+8.9
Turnout		3,458	37.9	−2.4
Conservative hold		Swing	+4.4	

=== Pemberton ===
Pemberton
Party	Candidate	Votes	%	±%
Labour	Jeanette Prescott	1,387	55.7	−1.9
Community Action	Mike Leyland	406	16.3	−0.3
Conservative	Benjamin Gray	350	14.1	+2.1
BNP	Chris Hilton	334	13.4	−0.1
Rejected ballots		14	0.6	+0.2
Majority		981	39.4	−1.6
Turnout		2,491	25.9	+1.0
Labour hold		Swing	-0.8	

=== Shevington with Lower Ground ===
Shevington with Lower Ground
Party	Candidate	Votes	%	±%
Conservative	Paul Liptrot	1,531	48.4	+6.5
Labour	Mike Crosby	971	30.7	−7.3
Liberal Democrats	Martin Sutton	251	7.9	−1.5
UKIP	John Atherton	251	7.9	−2.3
Independent	Andy Sumner	157	5.0	+5.0
Rejected ballots		2	0.1	-0.3
Majority		560	17.7	+13.8
Turnout		3,163	34.2	−0.7
Conservative gain from Labour		Swing	+6.9	

=== Standish with Langtree ===
Standish with Langtree
Party	Candidate	Votes	%	±%
Conservative	Judith Atherton	1,710	50.8	−7.1
Labour	George Davies	1,039	30.9	+2.3
UKIP	Alan Freeman	283	8.4	+8.4
Liberal Democrats	June Garner	214	6.4	−6.6
Community Action	Ronnie Barnes	116	3.4	+3.4
Rejected ballots		5	0.1	-0.4
Majority		671	19.9	−9.4
Turnout		3,367	35.6	−0.9
Conservative gain from Labour		Swing	-4.7	

=== Tyldesley ===
Tyldesley
Party	Candidate	Votes	%	±%
Liberal Democrats	Robert Bleakley	1,827	65.7	+2.7
Labour	Barry Taylor	621	22.0	+6.7
Conservative	Hilary Hayden	313	11.3	−1.4
Rejected ballots		29	1.0	+0.9
Majority		1,215	43.7	−4.0
Turnout		2,781	27.8	−0.8
Liberal Democrats hold		Swing	-2.0	

=== Wigan Central ===
Wigan Central
Party	Candidate	Votes	%	±%
Conservative	Henry Cadman	1,562	50.3	+6.1
Labour	Mathew Bullen	940	30.2	−2.8
UKIP	Keith Jones	378	12.2	+12.2
Community Action	Leanne Brotherton	213	6.9	+0.0
Rejected ballots		15	0.5	+0.2
Majority		622	20.0	+8.8
Turnout		3,108	34.3	−0.3
Conservative hold		Swing	+4.4	

=== Wigan West ===
Wigan West
Party	Candidate	Votes	%	±%
Labour	Terence Halliwell	1,089	43.7	−3.7
Conservative	Steven Surples	471	18.9	−0.3
Liberal Democrats	Darren Atherton	462	18.6	+18.6
BNP	Susan Mather	360	14.5	+0.7
Independent	Mick Dahl	104	4.2	+4.2
Rejected ballots		4	0.2	-0.2
Majority		618	24.8	−3.4
Turnout		2,490	25.0	−3.6
Labour hold		Swing	-1.7	

=== Winstanley ===
Winstanley
Party	Candidate	Votes	%	±%
Community Action	Stanley Barnes	1,226	46.9	+7.7
Labour	Phil Kelly	869	33.4	−10.0
Conservative	Paula Thompson	508	19.5	+2.4
Rejected ballots		9	0.3	+0.0
Majority		357	13.7	+9.6
Turnout		2,612	29.8	−2.2
Community Action hold		Swing	+8.8	

=== Worsley Mesnes ===
Worsley Mesnes
Party	Candidate	Votes	%	±%
Labour	Brian Baldwin	1,275	55.1	−0.2
Community Action	Hannah Leyland	662	28.6	+3.0
Conservative	Jonathan Cartwright	363	15.7	+4.2
Rejected ballots		16	0.7	+0.3
Majority		613	26.5	−3.2
Turnout		2,316	26.4	−1.3
Labour hold		Swing	-1.6	

== By-elections between 2008 and 2010 ==
Wigan West By-Election 10 July 2008
Party	Candidate	Votes	%	±%
Labour	Steve Dawber	817	38.3	−5.4
Conservative	Jonathan Cartwright	528	24.8	+5.9
Liberal Democrats	Trevor Beswick	344	16.1	−2.5
BNP	Christopher Hilton	200	9.4	−5.1
UKIP	Keith Jones	124	5.8	+5.8
Independent	Sandy Franzen	118	5.5	+1.3
Majority		289	13.5	−11.3
Turnout		2,131	21.0	−4.0
Labour hold		Swing	-5.6	
