= 2023 Wigan Metropolitan Borough Council election =

2023 local government election in Wigan

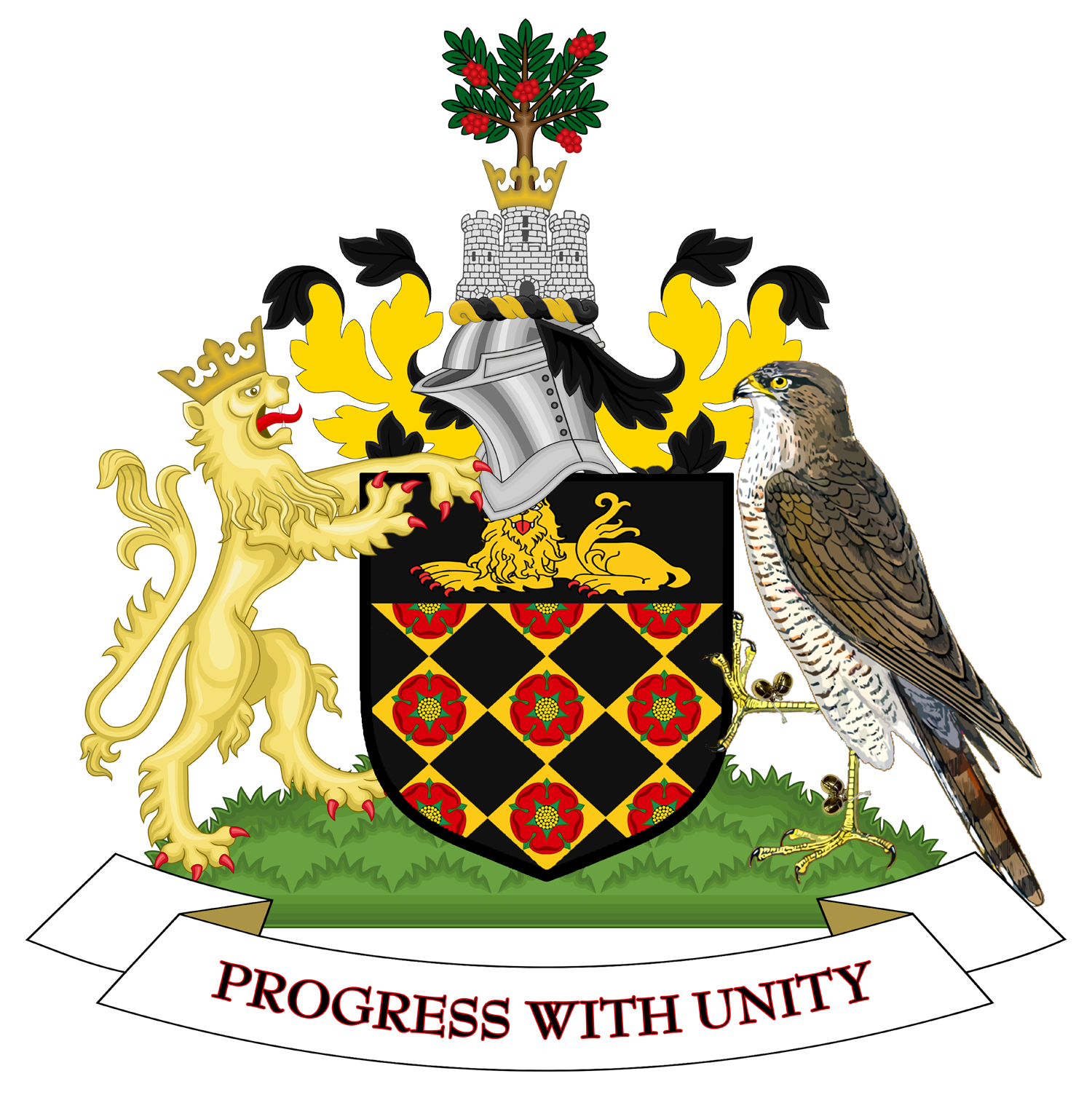
- 4 May 2023

All 75 seats on Wigan Metropolitan Borough Council 38 seats needed for a majority
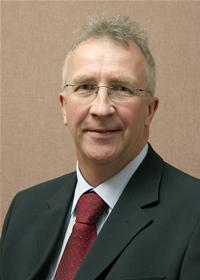

	First party	Second party	Third party
Leader	David Molyneux		Steven Evans
Party	Labour	Independent	Conservative
Last election	61	7 (Note: Of the seven independent councillors prior to the election, four formed the "Independent Network" led by Stuart Gerrard, and the other three were described as "Independent")	7
Seats after	64	9	2
Seat change	▲3	▲2	▼5
- Winner of each seat at the 2023 Wigan Metropolitan Borough Council election
Leader before election
David Molyneux
Labour
Leader after election
David Molyneux
Labour

The 2023 Wigan Metropolitan Borough Council elections took place on 4 May 2023 alongside other local elections in the United Kingdom. Due to boundary changes all 75 seats on Wigan Metropolitan Borough Council were contested.

Labour retained its majority on the council.

== Background ==
The Local Government Act 1972 created a two-tier system of metropolitan counties and districts covering Greater Manchester, Merseyside, South Yorkshire, Tyne and Wear, the West Midlands, and West Yorkshire starting in 1974. Wigan was a district of the Greater Manchester metropolitan county. The Local Government Act 1985 abolished the metropolitan counties, with metropolitan districts taking on most of their powers as metropolitan boroughs. The Greater Manchester Combined Authority was created in 2011 and began electing the mayor of Greater Manchester from 2017, which was given strategic powers covering a region coterminous with the former Greater Manchester metropolitan county.

Since its creation in 1974, the council has continuously been under the control of the Labour Party.

In December 2022 the Local Government Boundary Commission for England made The Wigan (Electoral Changes) Order 2022, which officially abolished the existing 25 wards and created 25 new wards with different boundaries. Because of this change, all 75 seats on the council, three per ward, are to be contested.

== Electoral process ==
The election took place using the plurality block voting system, a form of first-past-the-post voting, with each ward being represented by three councillors. The candidate with the most votes in each ward will serve a four year term ending in 2027, the second-placed candidate will serve a three year term anding in 2026 and the third-placed candidate will serve a one year term ending in 2024.

All registered electors (British, Irish, Commonwealth and European Union citizens) living in Wigan aged 18 or over were entitled to vote in the election. People who lived at two addresses in different councils, such as university students with different term-time and holiday addresses, were entitled to be registered for and vote in elections in both local authorities. Voting in-person at polling stations took place from 07:00 to 22:00 on election day. Residents had until Monday 17 April to register to vote, and voters were able to apply for postal votes or proxy votes until 18 April and 25 April, respectively.

As a result of the Elections Act 2022 electors were required to present photographic identification to polling staff in order to cast their vote.

== Overview ==
After 2022 election		Before 2023 election		After 2023 election	
Party	Seats	Party	Seats	Party	Seats
Labour	61	Labour	61	Labour	64
Conservative	7	Conservative	7	Conservative	2
Ind. Network	4	Ind. Network	4	Ind. Network	4
Independent	3	Independent	3	Independent	5

Number of Candidates fielded per party
Party	Number of Candidates
Labour Party	75
Conservative Party	38
Independents	25
Liberal Democrats	18
Leigh and Atherton Independents	10
Reform UK	3
UKIP	2
Green Party	1
Heritage Party	1
Standish Independents	1
TUSC	1
Wigan Independents	1

== Results summary ==
2023 Wigan Metropolitan Borough Council election
Party	Seats	Gains	Losses	Net gain/loss	Seats %	Votes %	Votes	+/−
Labour	64	6	3	▲3	85.3	60.9	96,342	▲7.9
Conservative	2	0	5	▼5	2.7	17.3	27,282	▼9.0
Independent	9	3	1	▲2	12.0	12.7	20,120	▲1.9
Liberal Democrats	0	0	0	Steady	0.0	4.2	6,567	▼1.2
Leigh and Atherton Independents	0	0	0	Steady	0.0	2.2	3,514	▲0.3
Wigan Independents	0	0	0	Steady	0.0	0.7	1,102	▼0.5
Reform	0	0	0	Steady	0.0	0.6	963	New
Standish Independents	0	0	0	Steady	0.0	0.5	795	▼0.5
UKIP	0	0	0	Steady	0.0	0.4	633	▲0.1
Green	0	0	0	Steady	0.0	0.3	416	New
Heritage	0	0	0	Steady	0.0	0.2	269	New
TUSC	0	0	0	Steady	0.0	0.1	150	New

Vote share % changes are with respect to the 2022 election results.

== Ward results ==
Incumbent councillors seeking re-election in their ward are marked with an asterisk (*). Turnout percentage changes are all relative to the 2022 turnouts for the respective wards.

=== Abram ===
Abram (3)
Party	Candidate	Votes	%	±%
Labour	Martyn Smethurst*	1,291	58.8	
Labour	Eunice Smethurst*	1,253	57.1	
Labour	Nazia Rehman	1,079	49.1	
Independent	David Bowker	646	29.4	
Conservative	Janet Walch	378	17.2	
Liberal Democrats	Graham Suddick	361	16.4	
Turnout		2,196	21.1	▼1.5
Labour hold		Swing		
Labour hold		Swing		
Labour hold		Swing		

=== Ashton-in-Makerfield South ===
Ashton-in-Makerfield South (3)
Party	Candidate	Votes	%	±%
Labour	Danny Fletcher*	1,530	64.7	
Labour	Jenny Bullen*	1,033	43.7	
Labour	Andrew Bullen*	989	41.9	
Independent	Gary Wilkes	733	31.0	
Independent	Joanne Bradley	502	21.2	
Independent	Stephen Hanway	476	20.1	
Conservative	Paul Martin	403	17.1	
Liberal Democrats	Geoffrey Stephen Matthews	149	6.3	
Turnout		2,363	26.9	▼0.2
Labour hold		Swing		
Labour hold		Swing		
Labour hold		Swing		

=== Aspull, New Springs & Whelley ===
Aspull, New Springs & Whelley (3)
Party	Candidate	Votes	%	±%
Labour	Chris Ready*	1,836	70.5	
Labour	Ron Conway*	1,835	70.5	
Labour	Laura Jean Flynn*	1,624	62.4	
Conservative	Gerard Joseph Houlton	556	21.4	
UKIP	Carl Davies	406	15.6	
Turnout		2,603	27.9	▼0.7
Labour hold		Swing		
Labour hold		Swing		
Labour hold		Swing		

=== Astley ===
Astley (3)
Party	Candidate	Votes	%	±%
Labour	Christine Lilian Roberts*	1,816	57.4	
Labour	Paula Anne Wakefield*	1,743	55.1	
Labour	Barry John Taylor*	1,617	51.1	
Conservative	Trevor Halliwell Barton	1,058	33.4	
Conservative	Eileen Patricia Strathearn	949	30.0	
Conservative	David John Stirzaker	817	25.8	
Heritage	Sandra Elizabeth Robinson	269	8.5	
Liberal Democrats	Sean Andrew Roocroft	253	8.0	
Turnout		3,164	29.5	▼2.8
Labour hold		Swing		
Labour hold		Swing		
Labour hold		Swing		

=== Atherton North ===
Atherton North (3)
Party	Candidate	Votes	%	±%
Independent	Stuart Andrew Gerrard*	1,481	54.8	
Independent	Jamie Hodgkinson*	1,420	52.5	
Independent	James Paul Watson*	1,119	41.4	
Labour	Julie Ann Hilling	899	33.3	
Labour	Paul James Blinkhorn	854	31.6	
Labour	Matthew Lewis Brown	698	25.8	
Atherton North Independent	Quinton John Smith	349	12.9	
Conservative	Keith Barton	186	6.9	
Atherton North Independent	Rick Carter	145	5.4	
Independent	Martin James Farrimond	81	3.0	
Turnout		2,703	26.6	▲0.3
Independent hold		Swing		
Independent hold		Swing		
Independent hold		Swing		

=== Atherton South & Lilford ===
Atherton South & Lilford (3)
Party	Candidate	Votes	%	±%
Labour	John Arthur Harding*	1,383	50.1	
Labour	Debra Susan Ann Wailes*	1,362	49.3	
Labour	Lee Robert Mcstein	1,206	43.6	
Independent	Rachael Flaszczak	900	32.6	
Independent	Anthony Thomas Waite	784	28.4	
Leigh and Atherton Independent	Cameron John Smith	532	19.3	
Independent	Mary Halliday	520	18.8	
Conservative	Kathryn Eirlys Williams	391	14.2	
Leigh and Atherton Independent	Luke Greenhalgh	279	10.1	
Turnout		2,763	26.7	▲1.5
Labour hold		Swing		
Labour hold		Swing		
Labour hold		Swing		

=== Bryn with Ashton-in-Makerfield North ===
Bryn with Ashton-in-Makerfield North (3)
Party	Candidate	Votes	%	±%
Independent	Steve Jones*	1,485	60.4	
Independent	Sylvia Wilkinson*	1,122	45.7	
Independent	Scarlett Rose Myler	1,087	44.2	
Labour	Margaret Therese Gaffney	670	27.3	
Labour	Samantha Joyce Lloyd	626	25.5	
Labour	Sandra Mary Swift	599	24.4	
Independent	John Cookson	551	22.4	
Conservative	Marie Winstanley	166	6.8	
Turnout		2,457	27.4	▼2.6
Independent hold		Swing		
Independent hold		Swing		
Independent gain from Labour		Swing		

=== Douglas ===
Douglas (3)
Party	Candidate	Votes	%	±%
Labour	Mary Gwendoline Callaghan*	1,236	64.1	
Labour	Patricia Draper*	1,216	63.0	
Labour	Matthew Thomas Dawber	1,180	61.2	
Green	Peter Jacobs	416	21.6	
Conservative	Margaret Atherton	380	19.7	
Turnout		1,929	20.2	▼0.3
Labour hold		Swing		
Labour hold		Swing		
Labour hold		Swing		

=== Golborne & Lowton West ===
Golborne & Lowton West (3)
Party	Candidate	Votes	%	±%
Labour	Yvonne Marie Klieve*	1,501	64.8	
Labour	Gena Merrett*	1,362	58.8	
Labour	Susan Gambles*	1,320	57.0	
Conservative	Stanley Crook	460	19.9	
Conservative	Angela anne Roberts	418	18.0	
Conservative	Richard Byrom Houlton	409	17.7	
Reform	Brian Aspinall	276	11.9	
Liberal Democrats	Stuart John Worthington	187	8.1	
Turnout		2,317	25.4	▼2.9
Labour hold		Swing		
Labour hold		Swing		
Labour hold		Swing		

=== Hindley ===
Hindley (3)
Party	Candidate	Votes	%	±%
Labour	Paul John Blay*	1,154	49.2	
Labour	Jim Churton	1,037	44.2	
Labour	James Talbot*	1,003	42.8	
Independent	Jim Ellis*	804	34.3	
Independent	Susan Jane Ellis	519	22.1	
Independent	David Joseph Culshaw	473	20.2	
Independent	Hilda Bridget Byrne	355	15.1	
UKIP	Jordan James Gaskell	227	9.7	
Conservative	Frederick John Stuart	196	8.4	
Liberal Democrats	John Charles Skipworth	186	7.9	
Turnout		2,346	23.7	▲0.4
Labour hold		Swing		
Labour gain from Independent		Swing		
Labour hold		Swing		

=== Hindley Green ===
Hindley Green (3)
Party	Candidate	Votes	%	±%
Independent	Bob Brierley*	1,150	47.4	
Labour	John Melville Vickers*	1,139	46.9	
Labour	Jim Palmer*	1,117	46.0	
Labour	David Josiah Aitchison	1,054	43.4	
Independent	Mark James Prescott	667	27.5	
Conservative	Paul John Chapman	361	14.9	
Liberal Democrats	Gary John Skipworth	212	8.7	
Turnout		2,427	26.4	▲0.5
Independent hold		Swing		
Labour hold		Swing		
Labour hold		Swing		

=== Ince ===
Ince (3)
Party	Candidate	Votes	%	±%
Independent	Maureen Ann O'Bern	1,106	53.1	
Labour	David Trevor Molyneux*	965	46.4	
Labour	Janice Sharratt*	808	38.8	
Labour	James Moodie*	713	34.3	
Conservative	Allan Atherton	277	13.3	
Turnout		2,081	22.5	▲3.8
Independent gain from Labour		Swing		
Labour hold		Swing		
Labour hold		Swing		

=== Leigh Central & Higher Folds ===
Leigh Central & Higher Folds (3)
Party	Candidate	Votes	%	±%
Labour	Keith Cunliffe*	1,472	65.1	
Labour	Shelley Guest*	1,415	62.6	
Labour	Fred Walker*	1,207	53.4	
Leigh Central Independent	James Edward Morley	431	19.1	
Conservative	Jean Dickinson	404	17.9	
Leigh Central Independent	Dave Fraser	360	15.9	
Leigh Central Independent	Hannah Elizabeth Sephton	357	15.8	
Liberal Democrats	Andrew Julian Lee Holland	149	6.6	
Turnout		2,261	21.6	▼4.1
Labour hold		Swing		
Labour hold		Swing		
Labour hold		Swing		

=== Leigh South ===
Leigh South (3)
Party	Candidate	Votes	%	±%
Labour	Kevin Anderson*	1,579	59.6	
Labour	John David O'Brien*	1,529	57.7	
Labour	Charles Rigby*	1,390	52.5	
Conservative	James Falle Geddes	769	29.0	
Conservative	Dominic Alexis Sutton	710	26.8	
Conservative	Mark Michael Temperton	685	25.9	
Liberal Democrats	Christopher John Noon	468	17.7	
Turnout		2,649	28.3	▼1.0
Labour hold		Swing		
Labour hold		Swing		
Labour hold		Swing		

=== Leigh West ===
Leigh West (3)
Party	Candidate	Votes	%	±%
Labour	Dane Kevan Anderton*	1,386	60.9	
Labour	Samantha Clare Brown*	1,375	60.4	
Labour	Sue Greensmith*	1,312	57.6	
Conservative	Marie Elizabeth Cooper	383	16.8	
Leigh West Independent	David John Evans	367	16.1	
Leigh West Independent	Jayson Allan Hargreaves	352	15.5	
Leigh West Independent	Rodney Halliwell	342	15.0	
Liberal Democrats	Simon Paul Brooks	199	8.7	
Turnout		2,276	20.8	▼1.9
Labour hold		Swing		
Labour hold		Swing		
Labour hold		Swing		

=== Lowton East ===
Lowton East (3)
Party	Candidate	Votes	%	±%
Labour	Jenny Gregory	1,820	48.2	
Labour	Garry Peter Lloyd	1,818	48.2	
Conservative	Kathleen Houlton*	1,751	46.4	
Conservative	Sheila Gough	1,734	45.9	
Labour	Tracy Ann Croft	1,705	45.2	
Conservative	Edward Noel Houlton*	1,683	44.6	
Turnout		3,774	34.0	▼1.2
Labour gain from Conservative		Swing		
Labour gain from Conservative		Swing		
Conservative hold		Swing		

=== Orrell ===
Orrell (3)
Party	Candidate	Votes	%	±%
Labour	Mark Ian Tebbutt	1,429	48.3	
Labour	Jim Nicholson	1,317	44.5	
Labour	Anne Collins	1,310	44.2	
Conservative	Michael William Winstanley	1,259	42.5	
Conservative	Marjorie Clayton*	1,194	40.3	
Conservative	Paul Kevin Bannister	1,144	38.6	
Liberal Democrats	Neil Duncan Stevenson	369	12.5	
Turnout		2,961	31.4	▼1.2
Labour hold		Swing		
Labour gain from Conservative		Swing		
Labour gain from Conservative		Swing		

=== Pemberton ===
Pemberton (3)
Party	Candidate	Votes	%	±%
Labour	Jeanette Prescott*	1,102	58.9	
Labour	Paul Prescott*	1,033	55.2	
Labour	Eileen Winifred Rigby*	890	47.6	
Independent	Tony Porter	515	27.5	
Conservative	Jean Margaret Peet	360	19.3	
Liberal Democrats	David John Burley	321	17.2	
Turnout		1,870	19.6	▼1.0
Labour hold		Swing		
Labour hold		Swing		
Labour hold		Swing		

=== Shevington with Lower Ground & Moor ===
Shevington with Lower Ground & Moor (3)
Party	Candidate	Votes	%	±%
Labour	Paul Anthony Collins*	1,661	50.5	
Labour	Michael John Crosby*	1,477	44.9	
Labour	Vicky Galligan*	1,382	42.0	
Shevington Independents part of Wigan Independents	Gareth William Fairhurst	1,102	33.5	
Conservative	Michael Colin Owens	710	21.6	
Conservative	Niall Mark El-Assaadd	528	16.1	
Liberal Democrats	Vincent Dean Holgate	433	13.2	
Turnout		3,287	33.4	▲0.5
Labour hold		Swing		
Labour hold		Swing		
Labour hold		Swing		

=== Standish with Langtree ===
Standish with Langtree (3)
Party	Candidate	Votes	%	±%
Labour	Debbie Parkinson*	1,705	47.7	
Conservative	Raymond Whittingham*	1,411	39.5	
Labour	Terry Mugan	1,303	36.5	
Conservative	Judith Atherton*	1,301	36.4	
Labour	Samuel Floyd Flemming	1,203	33.7	
Conservative	Gary Robinson	1,082	30.3	
Standish Independents	Debbie Fairhurst	795	22.2	
Reform	Andy Dawber	260	7.3	
TUSC	Sharon Holden	150	4.2	
Turnout		3,574	31.6	▲0.6
Labour hold		Swing		
Conservative hold		Swing		
Labour gain from Conservative		Swing		

=== Tyldesley & Mosley Common ===
Tyldesley & Mosley Common (3)
Party	Candidate	Votes	%	±%
Labour	Joanne Marshall*	1,425	56.4	
Labour	Jess Eastoe	1,304	51.6	
Independent	James Anthony Fish	979	38.7	
Labour	Farai Nhakaniso	940	37.2	
Conservative	Ashley Mccarrick	626	24.8	
Turnout		2,528	26.1	▲0.2
Labour hold		Swing		
Labour hold		Swing		
Independent gain from Labour		Swing		

=== Wigan Central ===
Wigan Central (3)
Party	Candidate	Votes	%	±%
Labour	Lawrence Hunt*	1,711	61.7	
Labour	George Davies*	1,578	56.9	
Labour	Michael Mcloughlin*	1,419	51.1	
Conservative	Mark Nicholas Frith	832	30.0	
Liberal Democrats	Brian Dennis Whitney	666	24.0	
Turnout		2,775	29.7	▼0.7
Labour hold		Swing		
Labour hold		Swing		
Labour hold		Swing		

=== Wigan West ===
Wigan West (3)
Party	Candidate	Votes	%	±%
Labour	Phyll Cullen*	1,492	60.2	
Labour	David Anthony Wood	1,251	50.5	
Labour	Sheila Rosaleen Ramsdale	1,206	48.7	
Liberal Democrats	Ian Dyer	777	31.4	
Liberal Democrats	Stuart David Thomas	528	21.3	
Liberal Democrats	Brian Craig Duff Crombie-Fisher	499	20.1	
Conservative	Adam James Marsh	320	12.9	
Turnout		2,478	25.3	▼2.2
Labour hold		Swing		
Labour hold		Swing		
Labour hold		Swing		

=== Winstanley ===
Winstanley (3)
Party	Candidate	Votes	%	±%
Labour	Paul Terence Kenny*	1,436	61.3	
Labour	Marie Teresa Morgan*	1,344	57.3	
Labour	Clive William Morgan*	1,244	53.1	
Conservative	Margaret Mary Winstanley	563	24.0	
Liberal Democrats	Robert Duncan Stevenson	498	21.2	
Reform	Robert Francis Kenyon	427	18.2	
Turnout		2,344	26.2	▼0.4
Labour hold		Swing		
Labour hold		Swing		
Labour hold		Swing		

=== Worsley Mesnes ===
Worsley Mesnes (3)
Party	Candidate	Votes	%	±%
Labour	David Roland Hurst*	1,416	65.1	
Labour	Helen Louise O'Neill	1,009	46.4	
Labour	Paul David James Molyneux	999	46.0	
Independent	Danny Cooke	645	29.7	
Conservative	Susan Atherton	428	19.7	
Liberal Democrats	Donald John Macnamara	312	14.4	
Turnout		2,174	24.4	▼1.1
Labour hold		Swing		
Labour hold		Swing		
Labour hold		Swing		
