= Community Action Party =

Defunct political party in the United Kingdom

- Leader: Michael Moulding
- Chairman: Bill Burrows
- Treasurer: Tracy Lavelle
- Founded: March 2002
- Headquarters: Golborne, Greater Manchester, England
- Ideology: Environmentalism; Localism
- Political position: Centre-left

Website
- www.community-action.com (archived)

The Community Action Party was a minor political party in the United Kingdom, mostly active in Greater Manchester and Merseyside. It advocated free health care and education provision, a managed public transport infrastructure free to all at the point of use and a moratorium on the use of green belt land for building. It also supported a zero tolerance policy toward crime, and was against the introduction of identity cards and recent anti-terrorist legislation on civil liberties grounds.

In 2004 the party made a breakthrough in the Metropolitan Borough of Wigan, winning 18 seats, a gain of 13. The party later suffered a split, defections, and a loss of councillors in elections, reducing their number of councillors in Wigan Borough to five. They slowly expanded outside the Metropolitan Borough of Wigan into the Metropolitan Borough of St Helens, the City of Salford, where they gained a seat in 2008, and Warrington Borough.

== Founding ==
The party was founded in March 2002 by Peter Franzen, a construction industry professional originally from Liverpool and now living in Golborne. The candidates stood on a platform of zero tolerance of crime and improved facilities for young people. Community Action councillors have a free vote on any issue as the party does not impose a whip, and includes former supporters of all three main parties.

== Electoral history ==
The party put up candidates in four constituencies in the 2005 general election. It won no representation in the House of Commons, but had a number of councillors in the Metropolitan Borough of Wigan, Greater Manchester. In 2004 it made a large break through in Wigan Borough winning 18 seats, a gain of 13. They formed the official opposition group, the 'Democratic Alliance', with their ten councillors joining the Liberal Democrats' three in May 2007, but the grouping disbanded in July 2009. They supported the Green Party in the North-West region in the 2009 European elections.

=== 2002 local election ===
In their first election, the CAP stood five candidates in Wigan Borough elections and returned two councillors, both in Makerfield constituency, Franzen unseating the deputy leader of the council.

=== 2003 local election ===
The party stood 11 candidates in Wigan Borough, and took three seats from Labour, becoming the largest opposition party with five councillors.

=== 2004 local election ===
The party stood 48 candidates in Wigan Borough, winning a total of 18 seats in Makerfield Constituency and becoming the official opposition on the council. After the election the Labour leader of the council Peter Smith argued that "They are essentially a negative party, good at coming up with issues to campaign on, but not very good at finding solutions."

=== 2005 general election ===
Franzen stood in Makerfield against Ian McCartney, deputy chairman of the Labour Party, and the party stood three other candidates. Franzen received 2,769 votes (7.8%). Ian Franzen stood in Leigh, receiving 2,189 votes (6.0%). Former Labour council leader Mike Hughes received 573 votes in Warrington North (1.4%).

=== 2006 local election ===
The CAP lost three seats in Makerfield to Labour.

=== 2007 local election ===
The party held two seats and gained one from Community Performance First, but lost two seats to Labour. They stood four candidates in St. Helens, and two in Salford.

=== 2008 local election ===
The party held two seats in Makerfield, but lost Peter Franzen's seat in Golborne and Lowton West to Labour by 76 votes, and another seat to the Conservatives, resulting in their Democratic Alliance group losing its status as the official opposition group. The Labour Party made a complaint to the police about a YouTube video posted by one of the CAP councillors, Ed Houlton, about a former Labour mayor the day before the May elections, but no charges were brought.

In Salford's Irlam ward, their candidate Rick Houlton unseated Roger Jones, the Labour chairman of the Greater Manchester Passenger Transport Authority. The CAP opposed the congestion charge for Manchester that was proposed by Jones. Peel Holdings, a Manchester property company, commissioned a market research company to call people in Irlam ward about the congestion charge plan in November 2007. In January 2008, Peel met with the Liberal Democrats and Community Action Party to discuss how they could help them defeat councillors who were backing the congestion charge. A police investigation was launched over a possible breach of the Representation of the People Act 1983, but the Crown Prosecution Service said there was insufficient evidence. Houlton was criticised for his low council meeting attendance, which he said was due to working nights.

== Split and defections ==
The Community Performance First Party was registered with the Electoral Commission in 2006 by three CAP councillors ahead of the local elections, who said that they would still stand as CAP candidates. They were expelled from the party in April 2006, less than a month before the local elections, and the CAP took legal action to prevent them using the CAP logo.

An Ashton in Makerfield councillor defected to the independent group in May 2007, followed by a Winstanley councillor in May 2008. A Leigh councillor defected to the Conservative Party in January 2009, which made the Conservatives the official opposition group on Wigan Metropolitan Borough Council. A further defection to the independent group occurred in May 2009.

On 7 February 2014 it was announced that Mike Moulding had reregistered the political party. This was after the founder and leader of the party, Peter Franzen, had lapsed the party the previous year. Since then the founder and the new leader have been in a battle over the rights of the name. The party was deregistered again in 2016.
