= Reflections of Bedford =

Statue in Bedford, England

Coordinates: 52°08′13″N 0°28′01″W

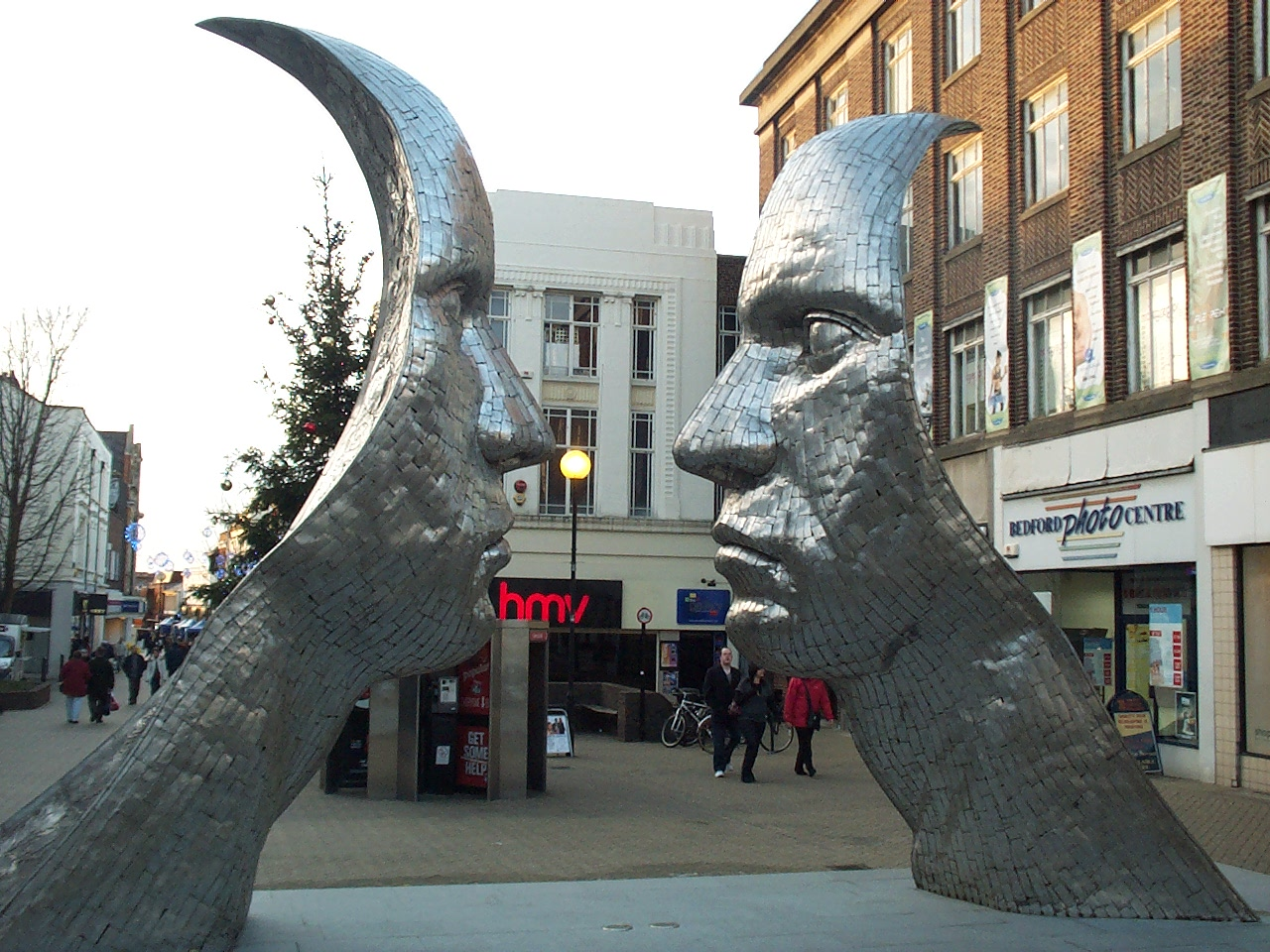
The two statues in Silver Street.

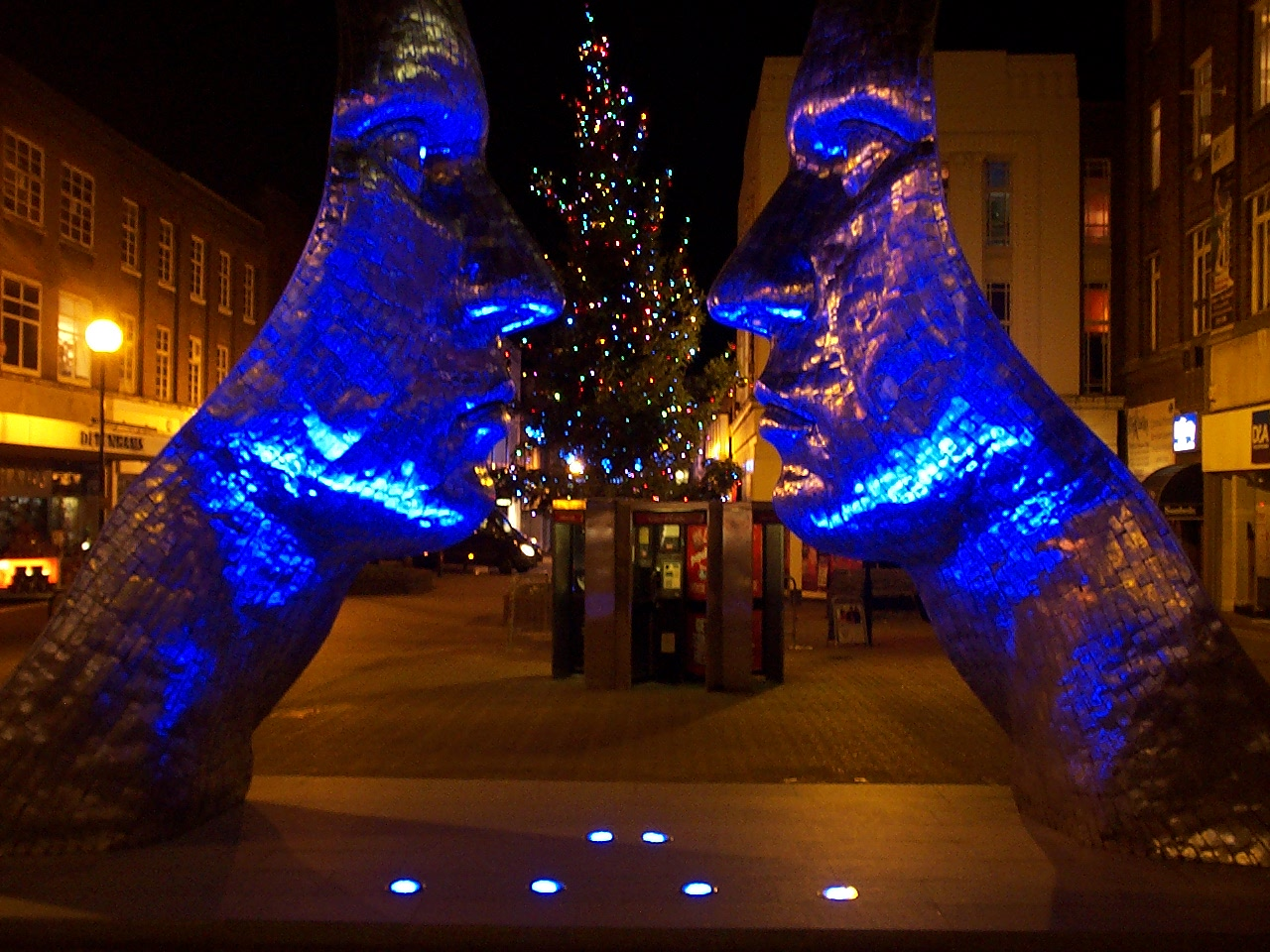
The statues illuminated at night with spotlights in the pedestal.

Reflections of Bedford is an abstract sculpture by Rick Kirby, located in England's Bedford town centre, on Silver Street. Commissioned by Bedford Borough Council, it was erected on 12 December 2009. Kirby was chosen after winning a Public National Art exhibition to design a new sculpture for the town. The statue consists of two 5-metre-high faces, opposing each other. They are both made of stainless steel, to represent the former mint located on the street.

The pedestal of the sculpture is also inlaid with blue and purple spotlights, which turn on at night to illuminate the statue. The backs of the sculptures are entirely flat, although one has a plaque attached stating the artist, name, and date of the work.

At installation, the statues were rather controversial due to their cost of £100,000, and an alleged lack of public consultation. In addition, the bust of Trevor Huddleston was moved to make space for the faces.

== Symbolism ==
The statues are inlaid with patterns of bricks and lace, symbolising Bedford's past in both those industries, as the Marston Vale brickworks and Bedfordshire lace were once major influences on the economy of Bedford. The sculpture is also "meant to represent the diversity of ethnic backgrounds in the town".
