= Rick Kirby =

British artist

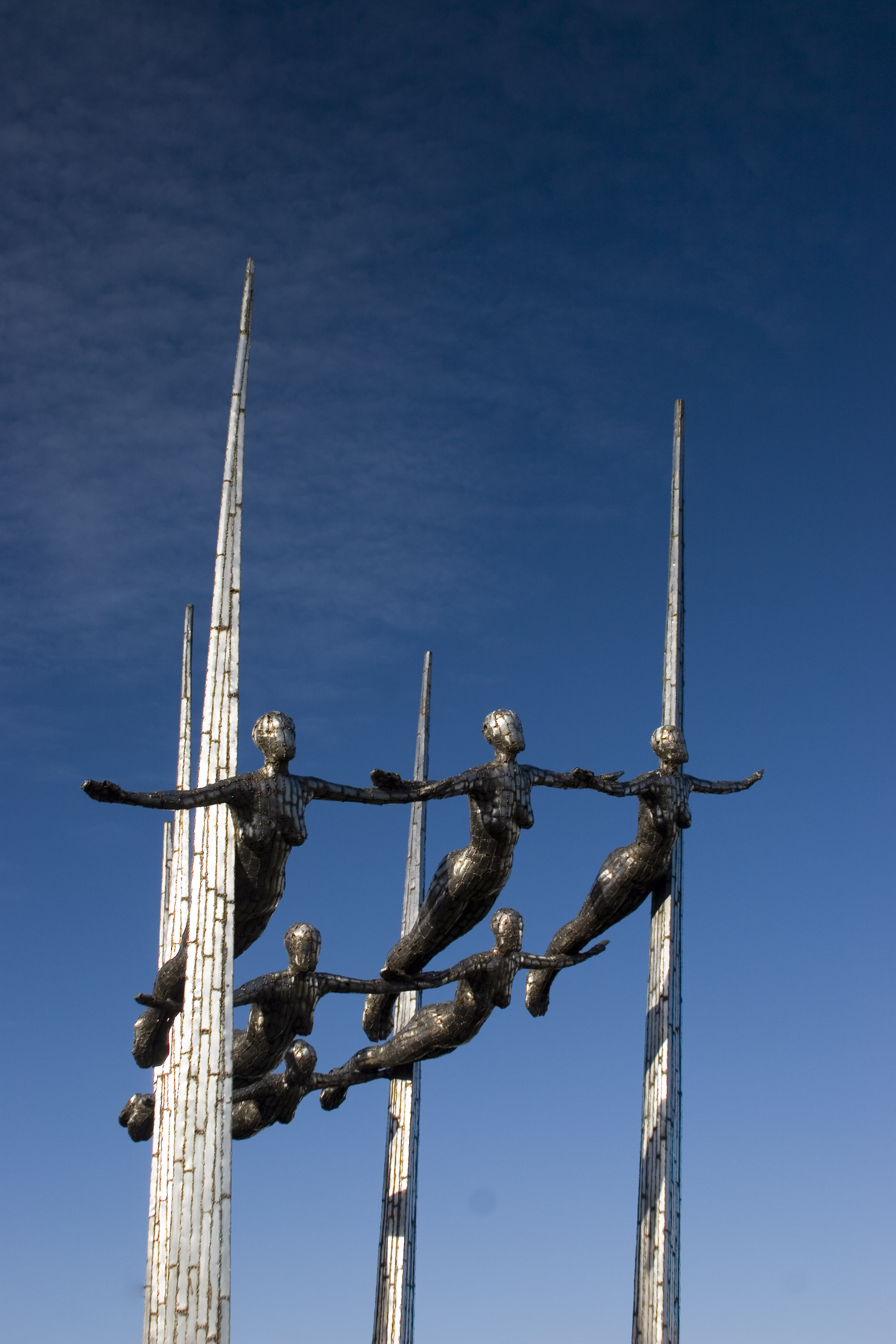
Kirby's Formation (2003) stands on the entrance to the Ravenswood housing estate in Ipswich, Suffolk. It is inspired by a World War II-era poster depicting aircraft flying in close formation being tracked by searchlights.

Rick Kirby (born 1952) is an English sculptor born in Gillingham, Kent. He started his career as an art teacher, before quitting after sixteen years to focus on his work. Much of his work is figural, reflecting an interest in the human face and form, and is primarily in steel, which he describes as giving a scale and "whoom-factor" not possible with other media.

== Early life and education ==
Kirby was born in 1952 into a naval family. He was interested in art as a child, and went on to study it after high school. From 1969 to 1970 he studied at the Somerset College of Art, and from 1970 to 1973 at the Newport College Of Art, from which he received a Bachelor of Fine Arts. This education was both liberating and confusing, he said, and left him without an idea for the direction of his work. From 1973 to 1974 he therefore studied towards an Art Teacher's Diploma at the University of Birmingham, and spent the next sixteen years teaching art.

During his time as a teacher Kirby's own artistic sense bent towards sculpture, and after sixteen years he quit teaching to focus on his work. For the next three years he sculpted in stone, before a steel-working co-tenant asked him to try out his welder. "Steel released me", Kirby said. "It gave me the ability to go huge, a scale that just is not possible with stone": a "whoom-factor!" As he described it, "it is the juxtaposition of steel in its raw form, cold-industrial, and the warm-human that my art breathes into it – that is my fascination."

== Work ==
Kirby's oeuvre is largely figural, reflecting a fascination with the human face and form that has persisted since his time working in stone. Though he uses an industrial medium in steel, Kirby's pieces are intended to express elegance and grace, and guardianship; a reviewer of one of his exhibitions noted that "they do not dominate their settings, but instead calmly watch over their environment with an air of gentle theatricality."

Most of Kirby's pieces are public commissions, and are therefore monumental in size. His pieces range in height from one to ten metres; his 2002 sculpture Sutton Hoo Helmet, modelled after the Anglo-Saxon Sutton Hoo helmet from the Sutton Hoo ship-burial and unveiled by Nobel laureate Seamus Heaney, is 1.8 metres (5 ft 11 in) tall and 1.6 metres (5 ft 3 in) deep, and weighs 900 kilograms (2,000 lb).

Several of Kirby's pieces are displayed in the Palace of Westminster in London, and in Putney along the banks of the River Thames. His works have been unveiled by Queen Elizabeth II, Princess Margaret, and Prince Edward. When unveiling When the Sky's the Limit the Spirits Soar in 2005, Prince Edward remarked that "I don't know quite what the word is. It seems to represent something going upwards."

== Notable commissions ==
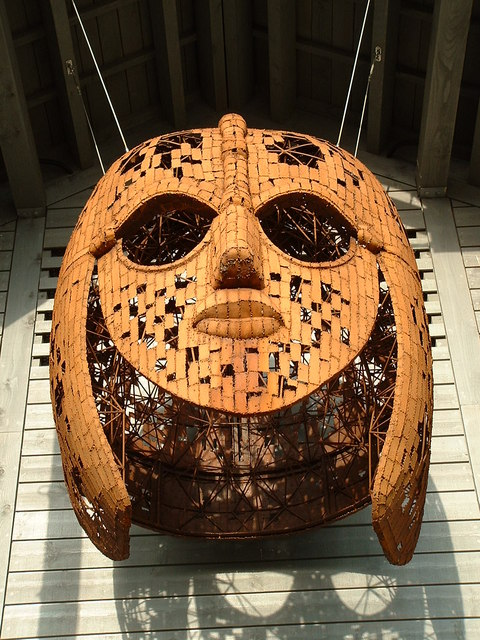
Sutton Hoo Helmet (2002)

- Crouching Lady in Bardon Mill, 1997
- The Ring of Hope in the Gardens of Gaia, 1997
- Figure in Middle of Lake in the Gardens of Gaia, 1997
- Public sculpture in Castlemilk, Glasgow, as part of the district's Gateways and Landmarks project in 1999 (Kirby's first Bronze)
- Cross the Divide at the Main Entrance of St Thomas' Hospital, London, 2000
- Sutton Hoo Helmet (pictured at right), Sutton Hoo exhibition hall, Suffolk, 2002
- Arc of Angels at Portishead, 2002, commemorating Portishead Radio Station
- Formation (pictured above) in Ravenswood, Ipswich, 2003
- Spiral Formation for South Woodham Ferrers Leisure Centre swimming pool, 2005
- When the Sky's the Limit the Spirits Soar, 2005
- The Face in Believe Square, Wigan, 2008
- Reflections of Bedford, Silver Street, Bedford, 2009
- Crouching Figure, Oakley Court Hotel, Windsor, 2012
- Hands, Woodbridge Quay Church, Suffolk, 2016
- 20th Century Head with others in the sculpture garden at Burghley House, Stamford

== Bibliography ==
- "2017 Quality of Place Award Winners". Suffolk Coastal and Waveney District Councils. 2017.
- "Aerial Art: Metal 'Angels' Look Out Over Portishead's New Development". The Independent. London. 1 June 2002. p. 7.
- "Amazing Art or Awful Eyesore?". The Wiltshire Gazette & Herald. 17 January 2002.
- "Angels of Portishead". Public Art Port Marine.
- "Artist of the Week – Rick Kirby". Hong Kong Art Tutoring. 18 February 2013.
- Cocke, Richard (29 July 2009). "Sutton Hoo Helmet". Recording Archive for Public Sculpture in Norfolk & Suffolk.
- Cornwell, Richard (25 November 2017). "Woodbridge 'Hands' and Felixstowe's Bartlet scoop awards for improving area's quality". Ipswich Star.
- Hoggard, Liz (15 October 2000). "The Enchanted Forest". The Independent. London. pp. 48–51.
- Hope, Jessica (June 2017). "His Implacable Gaze: Sculptor Rick Kirby at Bath Contemporary" (PDF). The Bath Magazine: 44–45.
- Kirby, Rick. "Rick Kirby – Curriculum Vitae". Rick Kirby Sculpture.
- Lonsdale, Sarah (27 July 2002). "A New Start for the Art in Residence". The Daily Telegraph. London. p. 7.
- Morton, Owen (31 March 2005). "Inspiring Attitude Captured in Art". Sevenoaks Chronicle. Sevenoaks. p. 9.
- "Rick Kirby". Bath Contemporary. Archived from the original on 11 October 2015.
- "Rick Kirby: 29 May – 20 June 2015" (PDF). Axle Arts. 2015. Archived from the original (PDF) on 1 January 2022.
- "Rick Kirby at the Oakley Court 2012" (PDF). Marcelle Joseph. 2012.
- "Rick Kirby Sculptor Profile". ArtParkS International. Archived from the original on 29 June 2019.
- "Sculpture Makes Every Passer-by the Face of Wigan". The Times. London. 13 December 2008. p. 28.
- "The Story of The Hands". Woodbridge Quay Church.
- "Sutton Hoo attraction moves closer". Ipswich Star. 26 February 2002. Archived from the original on 12 January 2026.
- "Work Unveiled". Essex Chronicle Series. Essex. 10 February 2005. p. 5.
