= Museum of Wigan Life =

Museum in Wigan, Greater Manchester, England

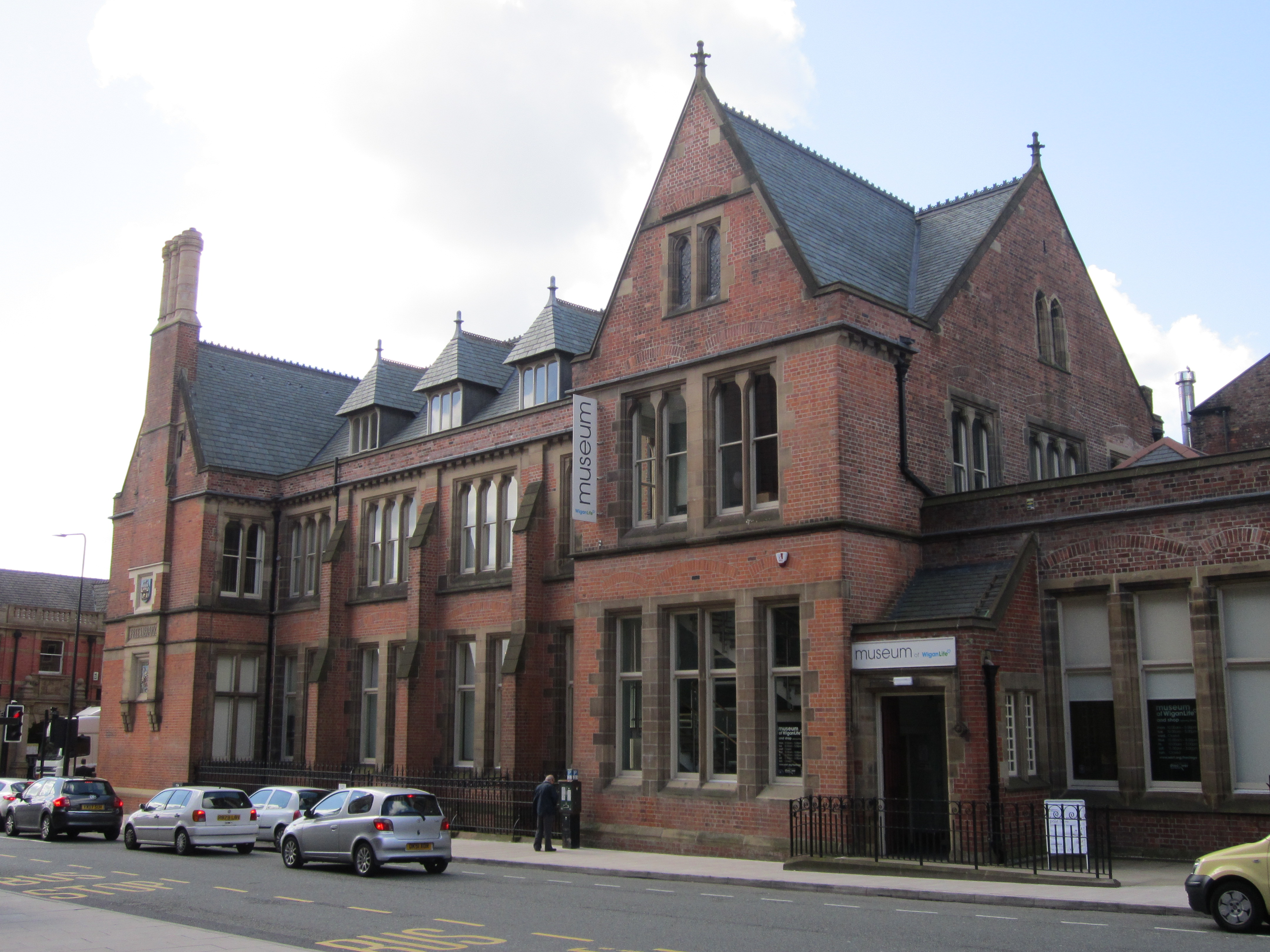
- The Museum of Wigan Life
- Established: 1878 (Wigan Public Library); 1990 (The History Shop); 2010 (Museum of Wigan Life)
- Location: Library Street, Wigan, Greater Manchester, England
- Coordinates: 53°32′39″N 2°37′47″W
- Type: Heritage centre
- Visitors: 16,000 (April–October 2010)
- Public transit access: Wigan North Western and Wigan Wallgate train stations, Wigan bus station
- Website: Museum of Wigan Life – official site at Wigan Leisure & Culture Trust

Listed Building – Grade II
- Designated: 1988
- Reference no.: 1384510

The Museum of Wigan Life is a public museum and local history resource centre in Wigan, Greater Manchester, England. The nineteenth-century listed building is by the noted architect Alfred Waterhouse. It originally housed Wigan Library, where George Orwell researched his book The Road to Wigan Pier in 1936.

The museum works with other museums in Greater Manchester as part of the Greater Manchester Museums Group (GMMG).

== History ==
=== Wigan Public Library (1878–1990) ===
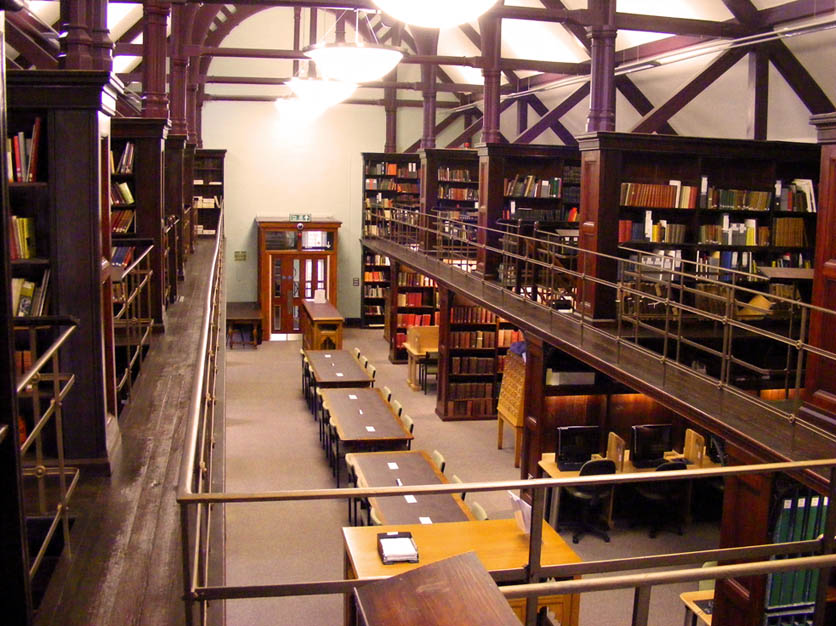
The refurbished Taylor Gallery

The building which now houses the Museum of Wigan Life was designed by Alfred Waterhouse and opened in 1878 as the town's first public library. Its construction was funded by mill owner Thomas Taylor and Dr Joseph Winnard, who each bequeathed £12,000. Dr Winnard's donation paid for the library's books, and portraits of the benefactors remain on display at the museum. Built on the site of Wigan Grammar School, the library was opened on 7 May 1878. A Grade II listed building, the architecture is largely in Elizabethan Revival style, embellished by some Gothic features such as its red brick arches.

On opening, the library comprised two main floors. The ground floor contained an ornate entrance hall, lending library and newsroom, whilst the first floor incorporated a reference library and the corporation's Public Library Committee meeting room. A third floor, later used for storage and later still as a staff rest-room, accommodated the custodian or caretaker-cum-security officer's flat. The librarian of the reference department was Henry Tennyson Folkard 1850-1916) who compiled a Catalogue of Books in the department (13 pts. 1890-1918) and various catalogues for particular subjects.

After eight months of discerning book acquisition –nationally renowned specialists were consulted on the selection of new books– the reference library totalled 15,300 volumes and the lending library 6,808. In response to the popularity of the newsroom where current newspapers and periodicals were held, an annexe was built in 1892.

=== The History Shop (1990–2010) ===
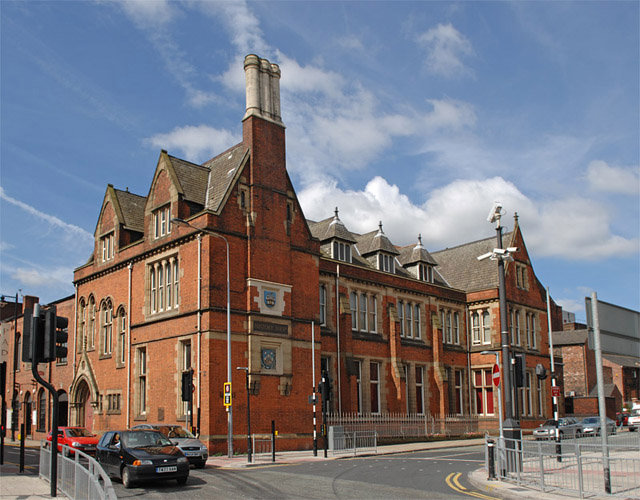
'The History Shop', as it was in 2007

In 1990, due to an increasing need for space, the library was relocated to the New Town Hall, on site of Wigan Mining and Technical College. In 1992, the newly formed Wigan Heritage Services opened the History Shop in the old library with intentions of hosting travelling (temporary) and in-house (permanent) exhibitions and the Wigan local history collection, parish registers and census returns in a study/research area on the first floor.

Initially, the History Shop shared the building with the Wigan Careers Service which moved out in 1995 and Wigan Heritage Services took over the entire building. Funding –a total of £260,000– came from the National Lottery and Monica Whickham, last surviving daughter of Wigan vicar William Whickham. In honour of the donation, the art gallery by the Library Street entrance was renamed the Whickham Gallery.

=== The Museum of Wigan Life (2010–) ===
The History Shop was closed in 2009 for a £1.6million refurbishment, to be reopened as the Museum of Wigan Life. £500,000 of Heritage Lottery Fund money was matched by Wigan Council and Wigan Leisure and Culture Trust for the building's redevelopment, which involved extensive internal and external restoration. The roof was re-tiled, whilst the ground floor exhibition space was renovated to focus on aspects of Wigan life and culture. New features included an extra staircase, family study area and a refurbished reception area, meeting room and shop. The museum was formally opened by Mayor of Wigan Michael Winstanley on 1 July 2010. In its first six months of operation, the renovated building saw 16,000 visits.
