= Sutton Hoo Helmet (sculpture) =

Sculpture based on a Saxon helmet

Coordinates: 52.0948°N 1.3415°E

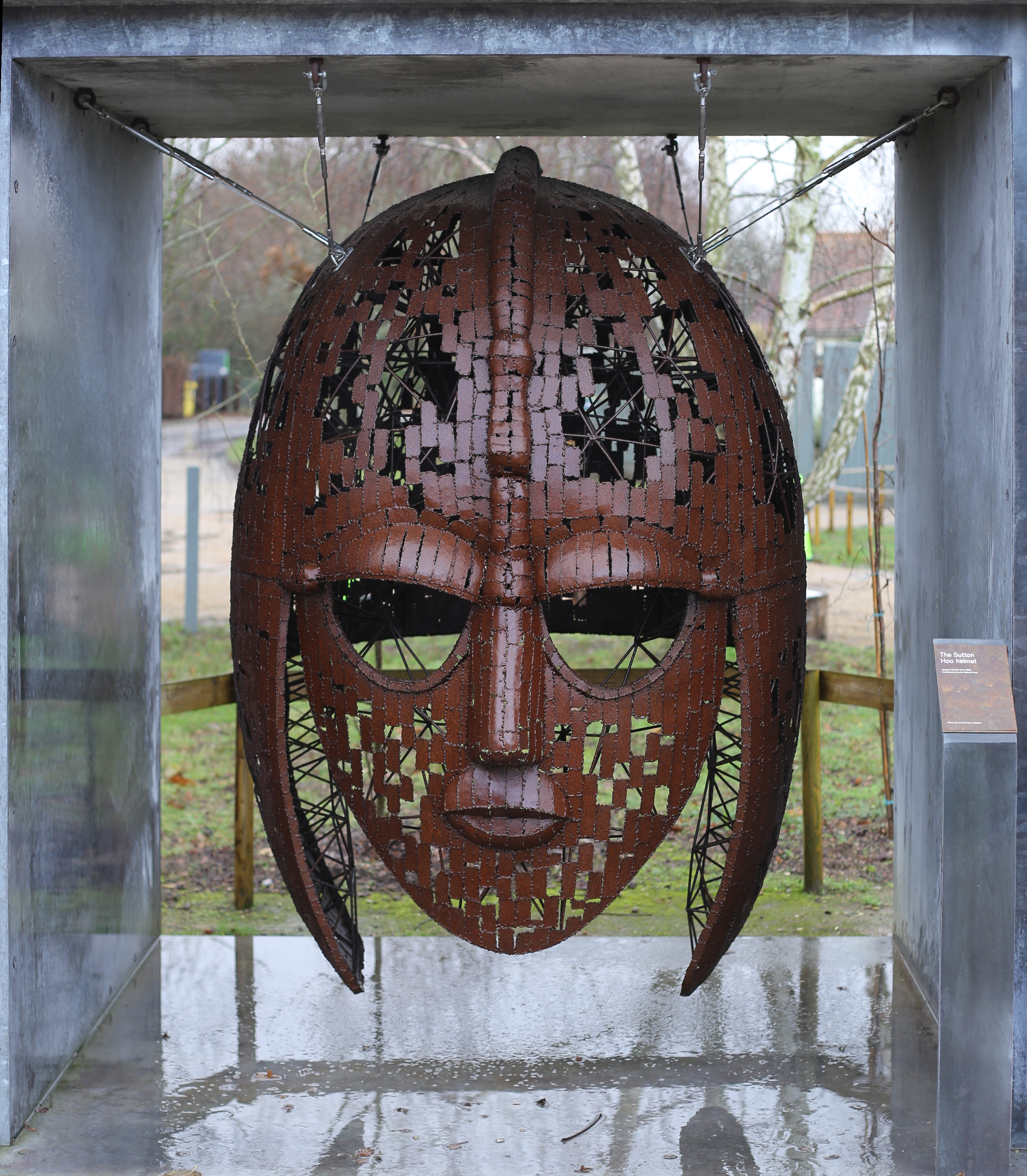
Sutton Hoo Helmet outside the Sutton Hoo visitor centre

Sutton Hoo Helmet is a 2002 sculpture by the English artist Rick Kirby. A representation of the Anglo-Saxon helmet by the same name found in the Sutton Hoo ship-burial, it was commissioned by the National Trust to suspend outside an exhibition hall at the Sutton Hoo visitor centre. At the opening of the centre, the sculpture was unveiled by the Literature Nobel laureate Seamus Heaney on 13 March 2002. It remained in place, dominating the entrance of the exhibition hall, until 2019, when it was moved to the entrance to the Sutton Hoo site.

The sculpture is 1.8 m (5.9 ft) high, 1.2 m (3.9 ft) wide, 1.6 m (5.2 ft) deep, and weighs 900 kg (2,000 lb). It is made of mild steel plates that are coloured red. Designed to have a "fierce presence", it is inspired by the fragmentary appearance of the reconstructed helmet rather than the glistening replica made by the Royal Armouries. Steel is Kirby's favoured medium, allowing the sense of scale and dramatic impact found in Sutton Hoo Helmet. The sculpture is illustrative of Kirby's largely figural body of work, and its mask-like quality has been repeated in subsequent pieces.

== Background ==
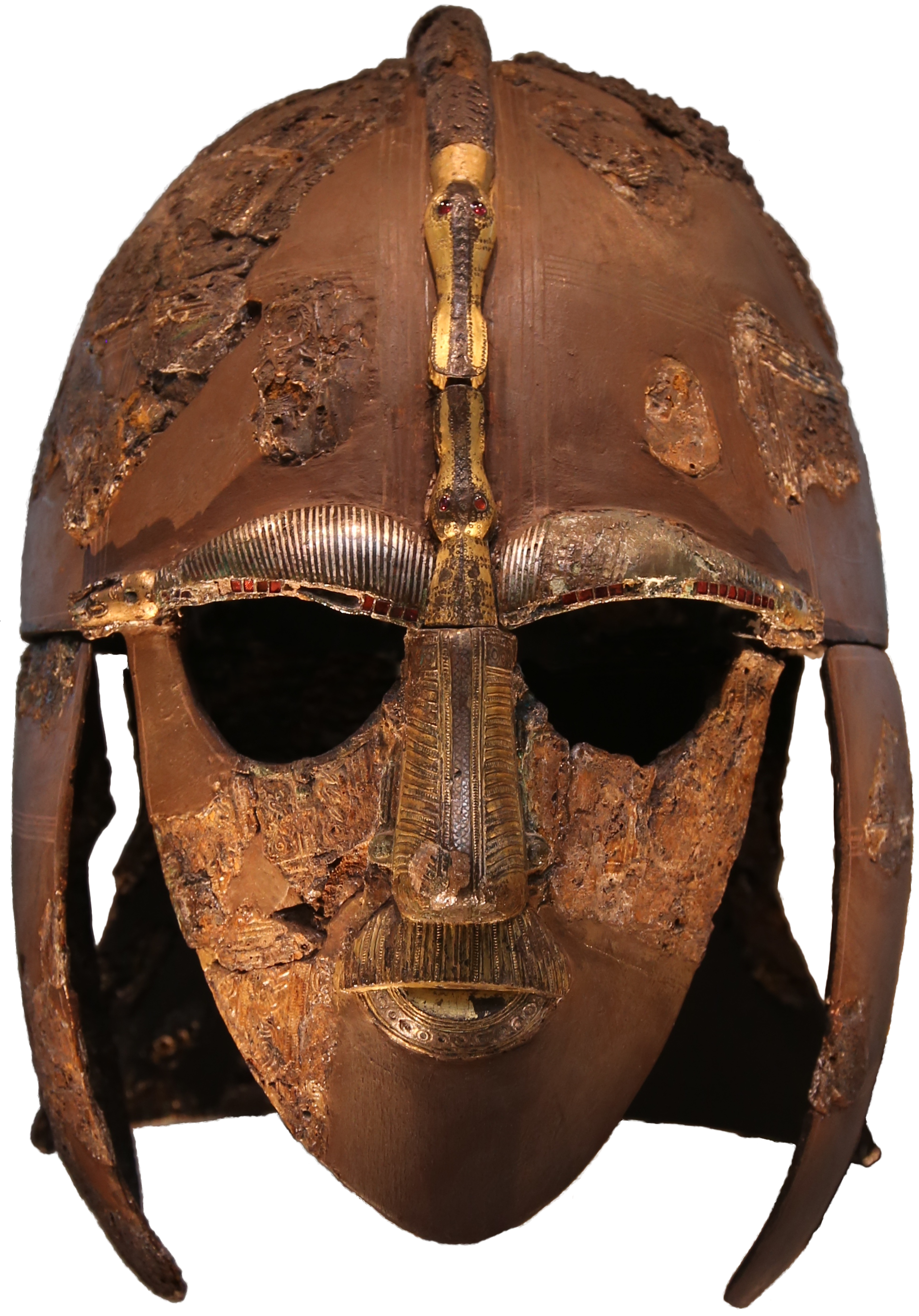
The Sutton Hoo helmet

In 1939, archaeologists excavating barrows overlooking the River Deben near Woodbridge, Suffolk, discovered an Anglo-Saxon grave of unparalleled wealth. The Sutton Hoo ship-burial was quickly labelled "Britain's Tutankhamun"; the finds reshaped views of what was then termed the Dark Ages, which—with new understandings of its wealth and sophistication—became known as the Middle Ages. The most iconic artefact, the Sutton Hoo helmet, was pieced together from more than 500 fragments. In the decades since, the Sutton Hoo helmet has come to symbolise the Middle Ages, archaeology, and England.

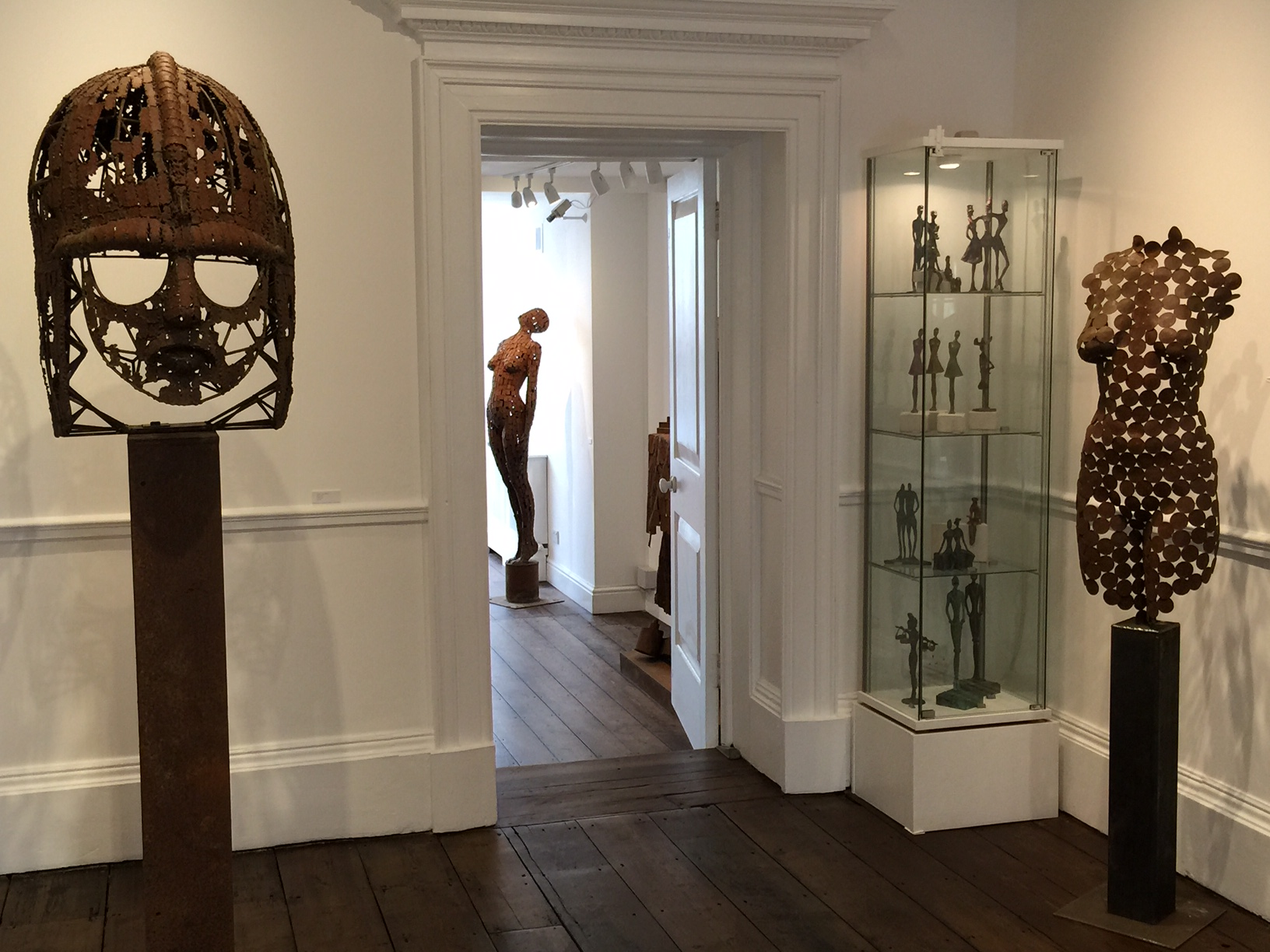
2015 solo exhibition by Kirby at Axle Arts in Bath, showing the maquette for Sutton Hoo Helmet

The Sutton Hoo finds were donated to the British Museum within weeks. The estate was privately owned until 1998, when its 245 acres, and Tranmer House (originally Sutton Hoo House and renamed by the Trust in honour of the donor), were bequeathed to the National Trust. In 2000 the Trust commissioned van Heyningen and Haward Architects to design a visitor centre. Their work included the overall planning of the estate, the design of an exhibition hall and visitor facilities, car park, and the restoration of the Edwardian house. The £5 million visitor centre (equivalent to £10.3 million in 2023) was opened on 13 March 2002 by Nobel laureate Seamus Heaney, whose translation of Beowulf, an Anglo-Saxon epic poem that describes extravagant burial customs similar to those observed at Sutton Hoo, had been published in 1999.

The National Trust commissioned the English sculptor Rick Kirby to create a work for the visitor centre. He was tasked with making something with a "fierce presence". Kirby's works then included several public commissions, among them a sculpture outside St Thomas' Hospital, unveiled by Princess Margaret in 2000, and another in the Calne town centre, announced by Queen Elizabeth in 2001. The National Trust Sutton Hoo Helmet was winched into place above the entrance of the exhibition hall on 26 February 2002, ahead of its official unveiling in March. The sculpture remained above the doors, dominating the entrance, until 2019; on 30 May it was installed in a new location at the entrance.

In the course of making the sculpture, Kirby completed a mock-up, or maquette. The maquette, 1.97 m (6.5 ft) high with pedestal, was offered for sale by a private art gallery in 2005, with an asking price of £9,600.

== Description ==
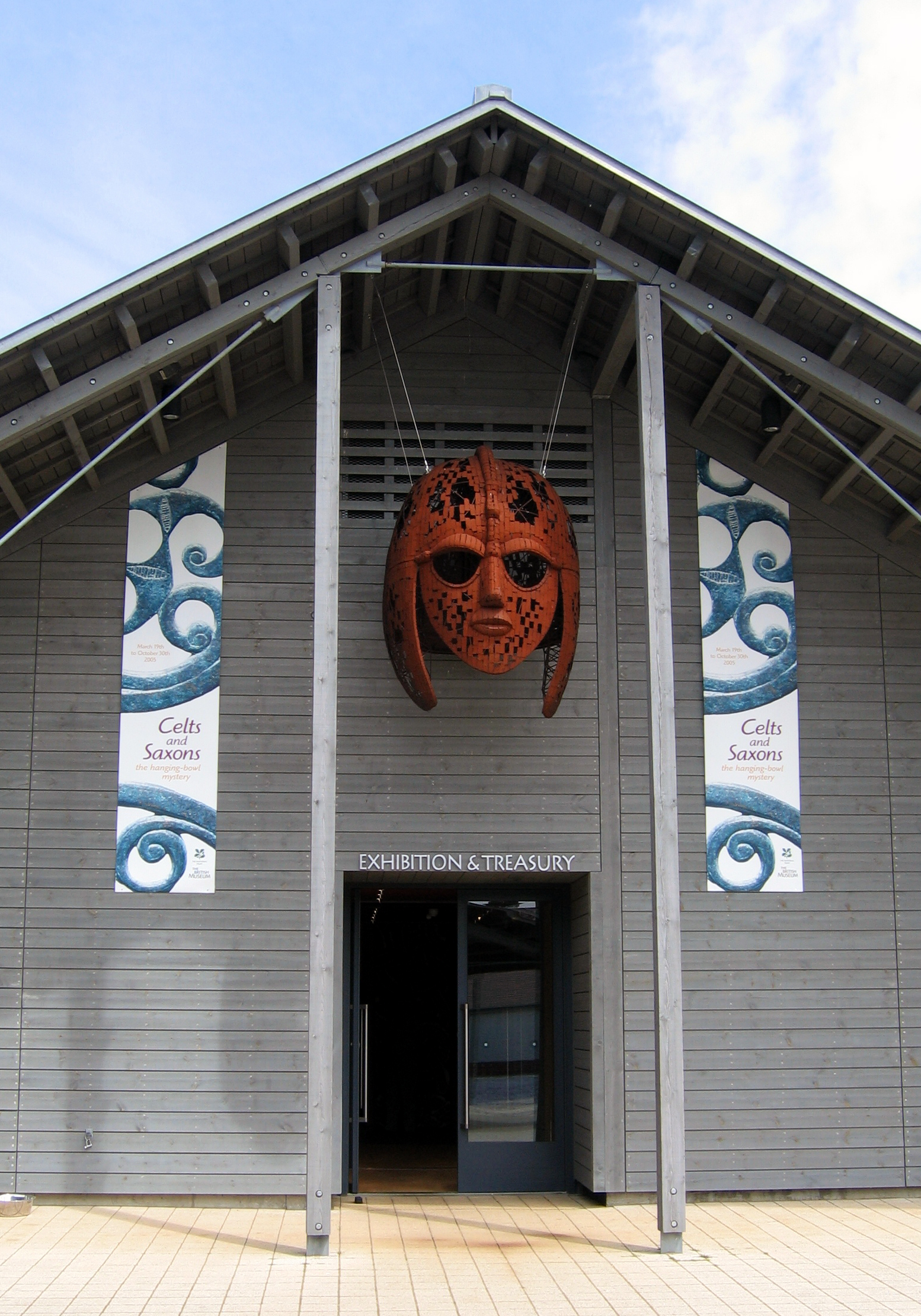
Sutton Hoo Helmet in its original location at the Sutton Hoo visitor centre

Kirby's sculpture is based on the famous helmet found in the Sutton Hoo ship-burial, but is rendered on a much larger scale. It is made from 900 kg (2,000 lb) of mild steel plates that have been coloured red, and is 1.8 m (5.9 ft) high, 1.2 m (3.9 ft) wide, and 1.6 m (5.2 ft) deep. The external structure rests on an internal steel frame. By contrast, the actual helmet is 31.8 cm (12.5 in) high, 21.5 cm (8.5 in) wide, 25.5 cm (10 in) deep, and originally weighed an estimated 2.5 kg (5.5 lb).

Like the fragmented Anglo-Saxon helmet, Kirby's work is made of many pieces of metal, evoking an object reconstructed by an archaeologist. The sculpture intentionally emulates the fragmentary appearance of the helmet's second reconstruction, reassembled from 1970 to 1971 by Nigel Williams, rather than the glistening replica made by the Royal Armouries. Sutton Hoo Helmet was described by the National Trust as "fantastic—such a striking image and it has a real wow factor", and by the East Anglian Daily Times as an "iconic" sculpture greeting visitors to the site.

Both the material and the subject are typical of Kirby's work. Steel is Kirby's material of choice, for what he describes as "the ability to go huge" and its "whoom-factor!" Much of Kirby's other work focuses on the human face and form, and his later pieces Masks and Vertical Face repeat the same staring, unemotive quality.

== Bibliography ==
- Bruce-Mitford, Rupert (Autumn 1972). "The Sutton Hoo Helmet: A New Reconstruction". The British Museum Quarterly. XXXVI (3–4). British Museum: 120–130. doi:10.2307/4423116. JSTOR 4423116.
- Cocke, Richard (2013). Public Sculpture of Norfolk and Suffolk. Public Sculpture of Britain. Vol. 16. Liverpool: Liverpool University Press. ISBN 978-1-84631-712-5.
- Dawson, Susan (10 October 2002). "Modest building fit for a king". Architects' Journal. Emap Construct: 4–7.
- Evans, Angela Care (November–December 2002). "The Sutton Hoo Visitor Centre" (PDF). Minerva. 13 (6). Jerome M. Eisenberg: 40–42. ISSN 0957-7718.
- MacGregor, Neil (2011). "The Sutton Hoo Helmet". A History of the World in 100 Objects. New York: Viking. pp. 301–306. ISBN 978-0-670-02270-0.
- Richards, Julian D. (1992). "Anglo Saxon Symbolism". In Carver, Martin (ed.). The Age of Sutton Hoo: The Seventh Century in North-Western Europe. Woodbridge: The Boydell Press. pp. 131–147.
- "Sutton Hoo Gets the Nod". The Architects' Journal. Emap Construct. 24 February 2000.
- Williams, Nigel (1992). "The Sutton Hoo Helmet". In Oddy, William Andrew (ed.). The Art of the Conservator. London: British Museum Press. pp. 73–88. ISBN 978-0-7141-2056-0.
