= Wigan =

Town in Greater Manchester, England

- Town
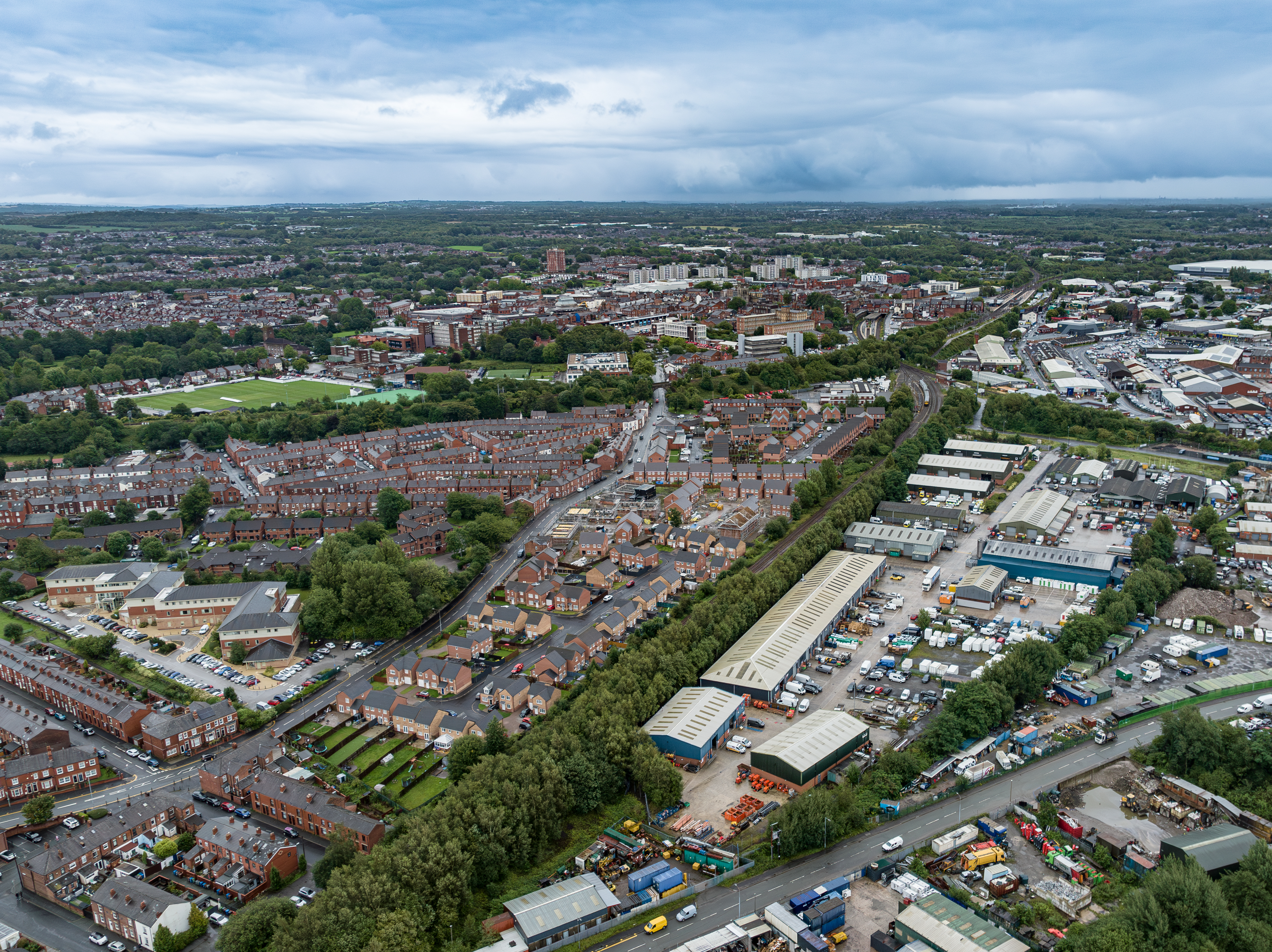
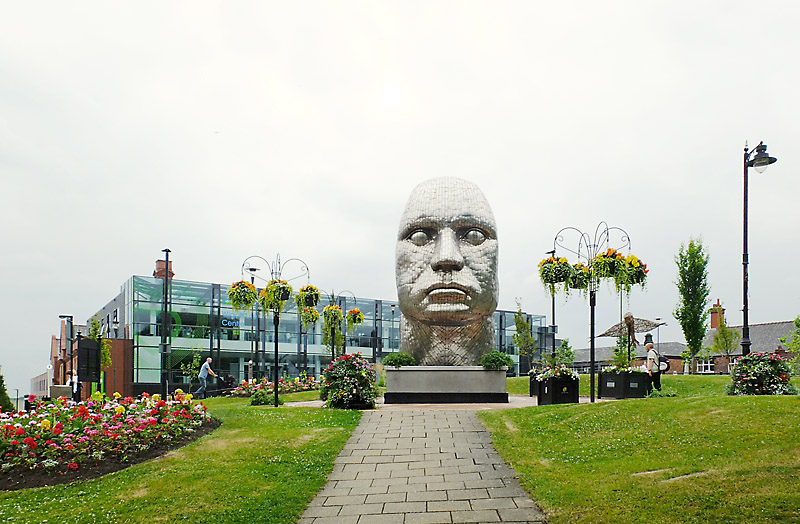
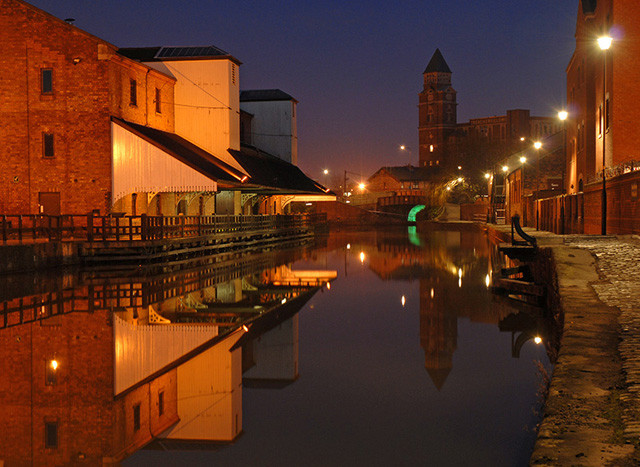
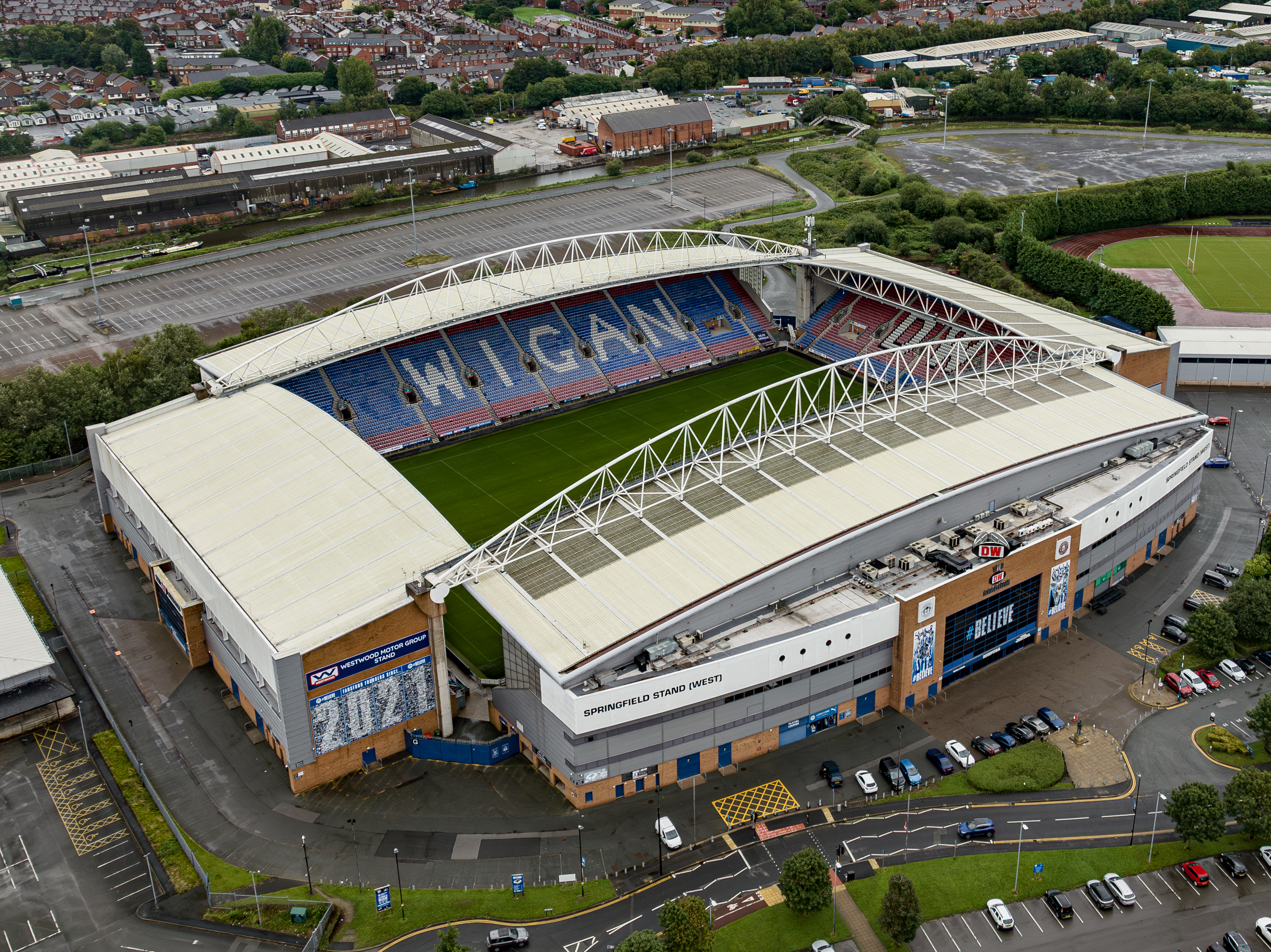
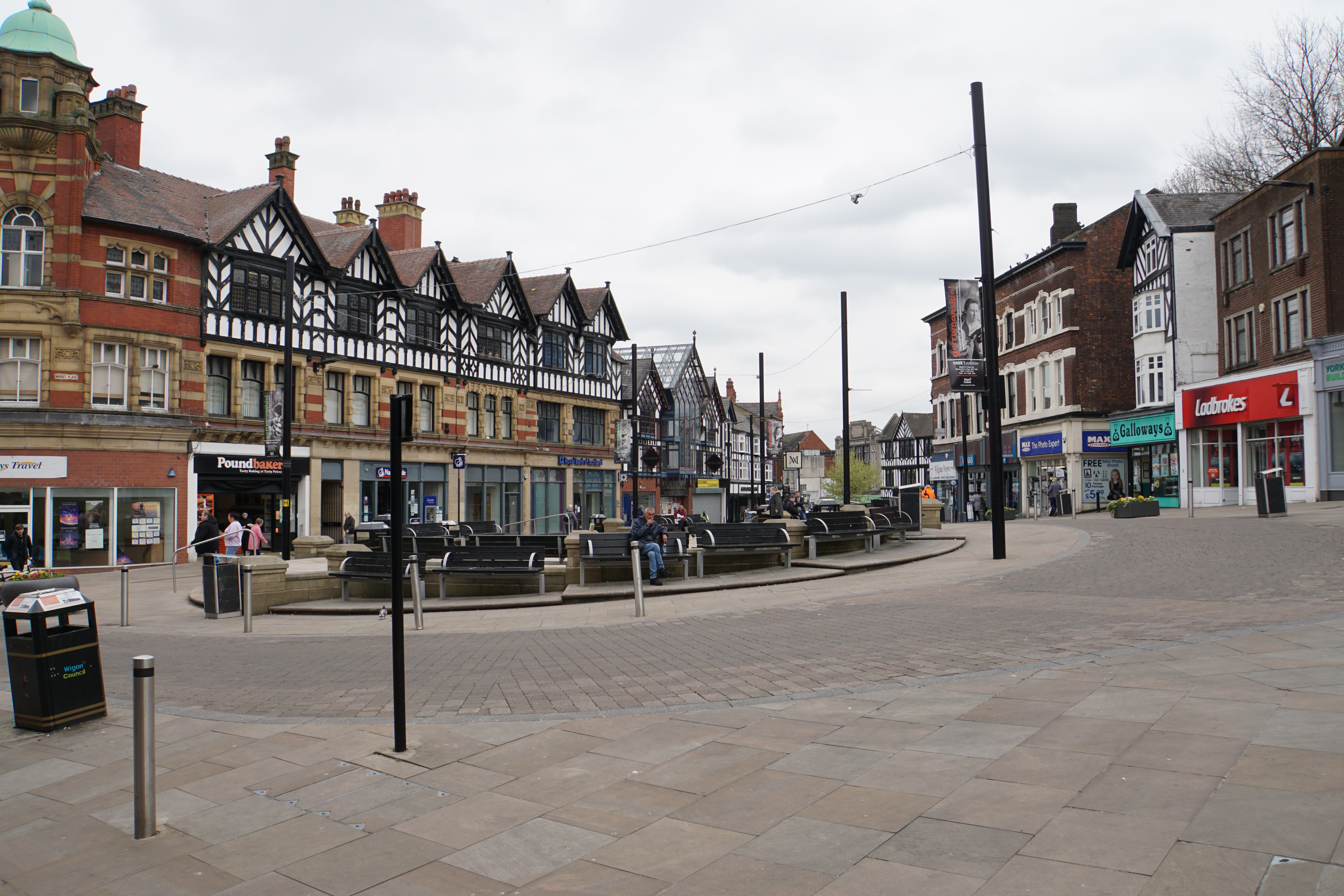
- Aerial view of the town The Face of Wigan Believe Square Wigan Pier beside the Leeds and Liverpool Canal The Brick Community Stadium Town Hall Market Place

- Location within Greater Manchester
- Population: 107,732 (2011 census)
- OS grid reference: SD583055
  - London: 176 miles (283 km) SE
- Metropolitan borough: Metropolitan Borough of Wigan
- Metropolitan county: Greater Manchester
- Region: North West
- Country: England
- Sovereign state: United Kingdom
- Post town: WIGAN
- Postcode district: WN1–WN6
- Dialling code: 01942
- Police: Greater Manchester
- Fire: Greater Manchester
- Ambulance: North West
- UK Parliament: Wigan
- Website: https://www.wigan.gov.uk/

Wigan (/ˈwɪɡən/ WIG-ən) is a town in Greater Manchester, England. The town lies midway between the cities of Manchester, 16 miles (25.7 km) to the south-east, and Liverpool, 17 miles (27 km) to the south-west. It is the largest settlement in the Metropolitan Borough of Wigan and is its administrative centre. The town has a population of 107,732 and the wider borough of 330,714. Wigan was part of the historic county of Lancashire.

The town was in the territory of the Brigantes, an ancient Celtic tribe that ruled much of what is now Northern England. The Brigantes were subjugated in the Roman conquest of Britain and the Roman settlement of Coccium was established where Wigan lies. Wigan was incorporated as a borough in 1246, following the issue of a charter by King Henry III of England. At the end of the Middle Ages, it was one of four boroughs in Lancashire established by royal charter. The Industrial Revolution saw a dramatic economic expansion and rapid rise in population. Wigan became a major mill town within a large coal mining district; there were estimated to be 1,000 pit shafts in total within 5 miles (8 km) of Wigan town centre. Coal mining ceased in the later 20th century.

Wigan Pier, a wharf on the Leeds and Liverpool Canal, was made famous by the writer George Orwell. In his book The Road to Wigan Pier (1937), Orwell highlighted the poor working and living conditions of inhabitants in the 1930s. Following the decline of heavy industry, Wigan Pier's warehouses and wharves became a local heritage centre and cultural quarter. The Brick Community Stadium, formerly known as DW Stadium, is home to Wigan Athletic F.C. and Wigan Warriors RLFC.

== History ==
=== Toponymy ===
The name of the town has been recorded variously as Wigan in 1199, Wygayn in 1240 and Wygan in numerous historical documents.

The name Wigan is probably a Celtic place-name; it might be a diminutive form of Brittonic wīg 'homestead, settlement" (later Welsh gwig), plus the nominal suffix -an (compare with numerous places in France named Le Vigan); the place name may refer to a Latin vicus. It has also been suggested directly a Celtic personal name Wigan, a name corresponding to Gaulish Vicanus, Old Welsh Uuicant or Old Breton Uuicon.

Similar place-names to the English Wigan exist in France, such as Le Vigan, Gard (Avicantus, Roman inscription; Locus de Vicano 1050) of unknown origin and Le Vigan, Lot, from Latin vicanum, derived form of vicus 'town' + suffix -anum, and the hamlets in Normandy such as (Le) Vigan (L'Oudon, Calvados) and Manoir du Vigan that derive from a Celtic given-name *Wigan, found as feodum Wigani in the 12th century or turres Wiguen at Thaon (Calvados) and survives in the Norman surname Vigan (still in use in Calvados).

=== Romans ===
There is very little evidence of prehistoric activity in the area, especially pre-Iron Age. In the 1st century, the area was conquered by the Romans during which time, it was in the territory of a Celtic people known as the Brigantes. The late second-century Antonine Itinerary mentions a Roman settlement called Coccium 17 miles (27 km) from the Roman fort at Manchester (Mamucium) and 20 miles (32 km) from the fort at Ribchester (Bremetennacum). Although the distances are slightly out, it has been assumed that Coccium is Roman Wigan. Possible derivations of Coccium include from the Latin coccum, meaning "scarlet in colour, scarlet cloth", or from cocus, meaning "cook". Over the years chance finds (coins and pottery) provided clear indications that a Roman settlement existed at Wigan, although its size and status remained unknown.

In 2005, investigations ahead of the Grand Arcade development, and at the Joint Service Centre development in 2008, have proven that Wigan was a significant Roman site in the late first and second centuries AD. The excavated remains of ditches at Ship Yard off Millgate were consistent with use by the Roman military and possibly formed part of the defences for a fort or a temporary camp. More remains were excavated to the south, in the area of McEwen's Yard (opposite the baths), where foundations of a large and important building were discovered, together with many other Roman features. The building is 36 by 18 metres (118 by 59 ft) in size with stone walls and a tiled roof. It contained around nine or ten rooms including three with hypocausts. It had a colonnaded portico on the northern side, which presumably formed the main entrance. The structure's ground-plan and the presence of the hypocausts show it may have been a bath-house. A timber building excavated at the Joint Service Centre (top of the Wiend) has been interpreted as a barrack block. This suggests a Roman fort occupied the crest of the hill, taking advantage of the strategic position overlooking the River Douglas. The evidence gained from these excavations shows that Wigan was an important Roman settlement, and was almost certainly the place referred to as Coccium in the Antonine Itinerary.

=== Anglo-Saxons ===
In the Anglo-Saxon period, the area was probably under the control of the Northumbrians and later the Mercians. Celtic names in the area around Wigan—such as Ashton in Makerfield and Ince—indicate a continued Celtic presence in the area in the face of Anglo-Saxon incursions. In the early 10th century, there was an influx of Scandinavians expelled from Ireland. This can be seen in place names such as Scholes, part of Wigan which derives from the Scandinavian skali meaning "hut". Further evidence comes from some street names in Wigan which have Scandinavian origins.

=== Domesday Book ===
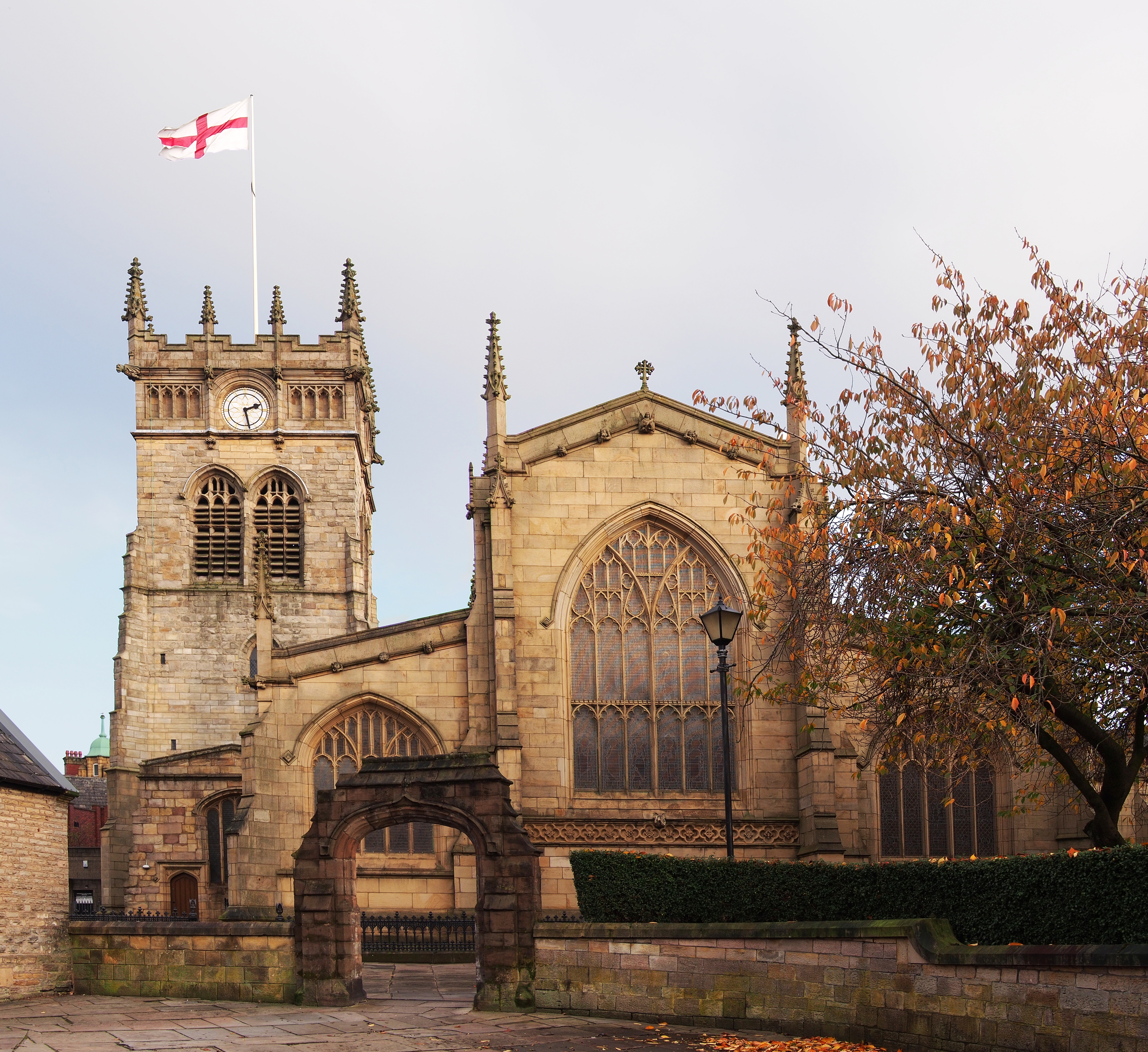
All Saints' Church was substantially rebuilt between 1845 and 1850.

Wigan is not mentioned in the Domesday Book, possibly because it was included in the Neweton barony (now Newton-le-Willows). It is thought that the mention of the unnamed church in the manor of Neweton is Wigan Parish Church (not the church of St. Oswald (Winwick) which is specifically named in the Domesday Book). The rectors of the parish church were lords of the manor of Wigan, a sub-manor of Neweton, until the 19th century. Wigan was incorporated as a borough in 1246 following the issue of a charter by King Henry III to John Maunsell, the local church rector and lord of the manor. The borough was later granted another charter in 1257–1258, allowing the lord of the manor to hold a market every Monday and two annual fairs. The town is recorded on the earliest-surviving map of Britain, the Gough Map made around 1360, which highlights its position on the main western north–south highway with distance markers to Preston and Warrington.

Edward II visited Wigan in 1323 in an effort to stabilise the region which had been the source of the Banastre Rebellion in 1315. Edward stayed in nearby Up Holland Priory and held court in the town over a period of several days. During the medieval period Wigan expanded and prospered and in 1536, antiquarian John Leland described the town, saying "Wigan paved; as big as Warrington and better builded. There is one parish church amid the town. Some merchants, some artificers, some farmers."

=== Civil War ===
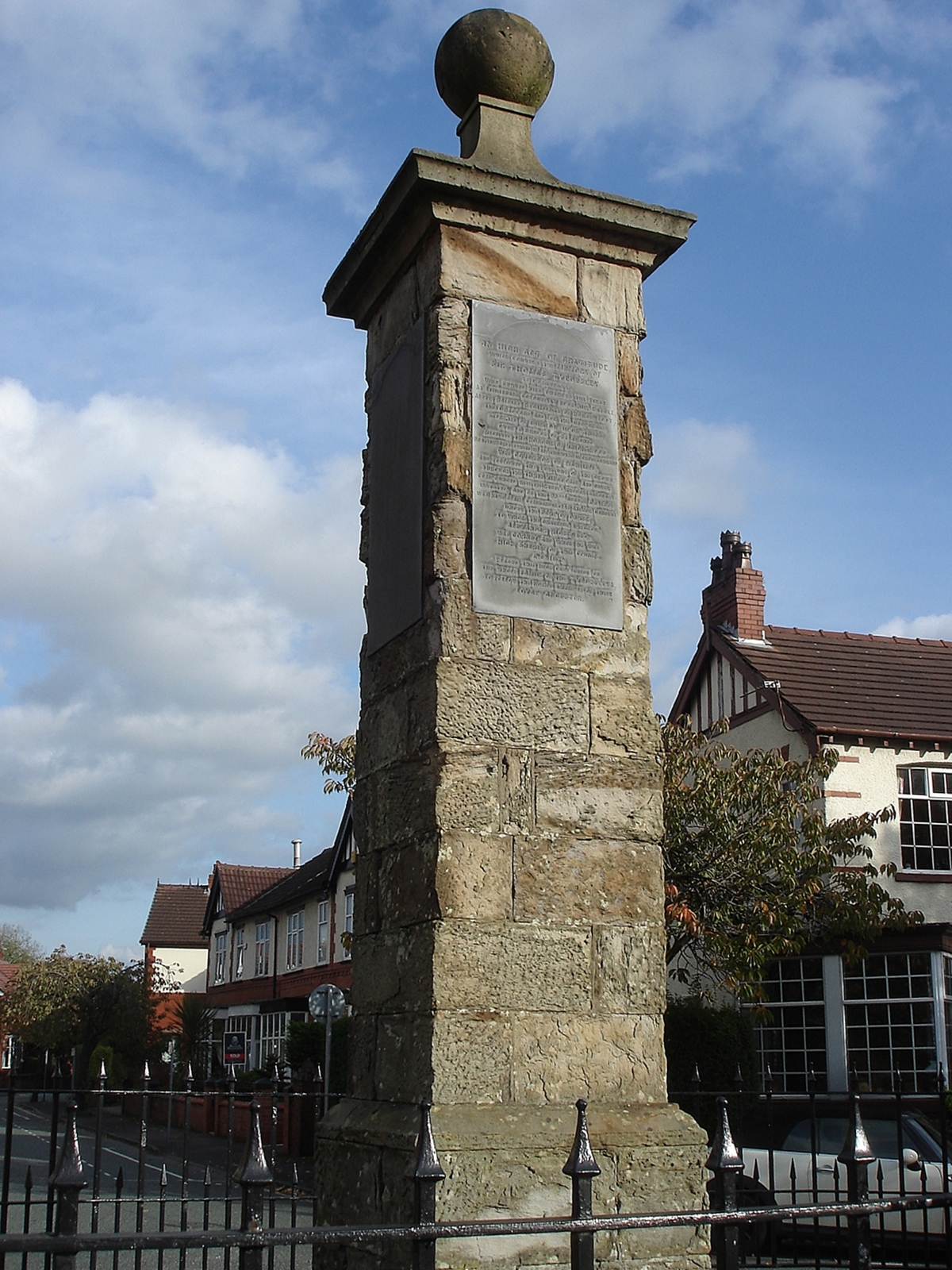
Wigan Lane monument

In the English Civil War, most people in the town were Royalists and James Stanley, 7th Earl of Derby, a prominent and influential Royalist in the civil war, made Wigan his headquarters. His forces successfully captured Preston but failed in assaults on Manchester and Lancaster and two attempts to capture Bolton. Abandoning attempts to secure Lancashire, he took his forces to the Isle of Man to secure his holdings there. The Earl of Derby was absent when Wigan fell, despite fortifications built around the town, Wigan was captured by Parliamentarian forces on 1 April 1643, the takeover was complete in two hours and the town was pillaged before the defences were broken down and the Parliamentarians retreated. In 1648, Royalist forces under James Hamilton, 1st Duke of Hamilton, occupied Wigan after they had been defeated by Oliver Cromwell at the Battle of Preston. The soldiers looted the town as they retreated to Warrington, and afterwards, it experienced pestilence. Cromwell himself described Wigan as "a great and poor town, and very malignant."

The Battle of Wigan Lane was fought on 25 August 1651 during the Third English Civil War, between 1,500 Royalists under the command of the James Stanley, Earl of Derby marching to join the King at Worcester and 3,000 of the New Model Army under the command of Colonel Robert Lilburne hunting them. Lilburne arrived at Wigan to find the Royalists leaving to march towards Manchester but with his force consisting mostly of cavalry recognised it would be dangerous to engage in the narrow lanes around the town and decided to wait for his foot soldiers to arrive and flank the town. The Royalists seeing an opportunity to engage the divided force turned around to engage but Lilburne decided to hold his ground deploying cavalry on Wigan Lane and infantry in the hedgerows to the sides, The Royalists made several charges but, after two hours, were unable to break the Parliamentarian line and were forced to flee after being overwhelmed by superior numbers. Although Stanley was injured he managed to find refuge in the town. David Craine states, "those who did not fall in the fighting [were] hunted to their death through the countryside". A monument on Wigan Lane marks the place where Sir Thomas Tyldesley a Major General commanding the Royalist troops fell, it was erected 28 years after the battle in 1679 by Alexander Rigby, Tyldesley's standard bearer. After his restoration in 1660, King Charles II gave the town a sword, which is on display at the Museum of Wigan Life, and the right to the motto 'Ancient and Loyal'.

=== Industrial Revolution ===
In 1698, Celia Fiennes described Wigan as "a pretty market town built of stone and brick". In 1720, the moot hall was rebuilt, funded by the members of the borough. It was used as the town hall, and the earliest reference to it dates from the 15th century. Prior to its final destruction in 1869, the hall was rebuilt in 1829. Wigan's status as a centre for coal production, engineering and textiles in the 18th century led to the Douglas Navigation in the 1740s; this was the canalisation of part of the River Douglas, and later to the Leeds and Liverpool Canal. The canal from Liverpool to Leeds was originally to serve Wigan on a spur, transporting cloth and food grown on the West Lancashire Plain to the Port of Liverpool. Construction restarted in the 1790s, after a pause of some decades, as coal was rising in importance due to the progress of the Industrial Revolution. The route was altered at the request of mill-owners, with the spur becoming the primary route and Wigan a hub for the transport of coal from the Lancashire coal pits to Liverpool and Leeds.

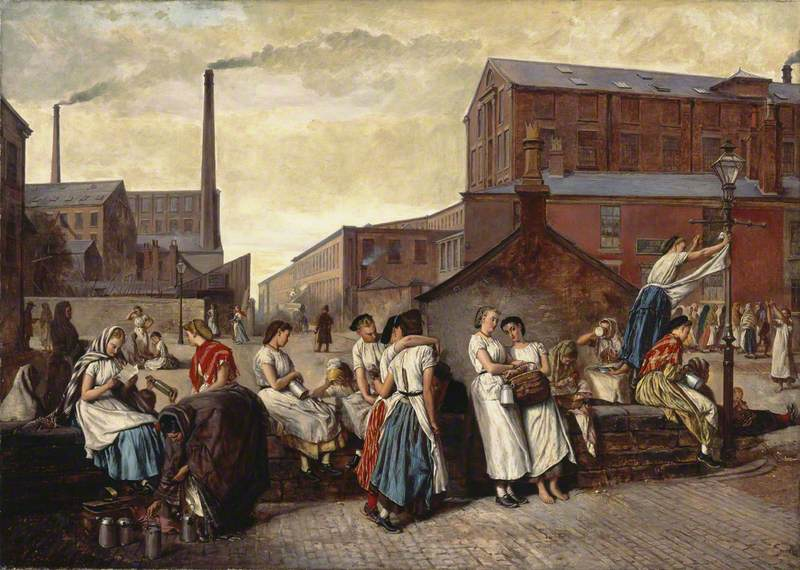
The Dinner Hour, Wigan (1874) by Eyre Crowe

As a mill town, Wigan was an important centre of textile manufacture during the Industrial Revolution, but it was not until the 1800s that cotton factories began to spread into the town. This was due to a dearth of fast-flowing streams and rivers in the area, but by 1818 there were eight cotton mills in the Wallgate part of Wigan. In 1818 William Woods introduced the first power-looms to the Wigan cotton mills. These mills swiftly became infamous for their dangerous and unbearable conditions, low pay and use of child labour. As well as being a mill town, Wigan was also an important centre for coal production. It was recorded that in 1854 there were 54 collieries in and around the town, about a sixth of all collieries in Lancashire.

In the 1830s, Wigan became one of the first towns in Britain to be served by a railway; the line had connections to Preston and the Manchester and Liverpool Railway. This was the first in a network of public and industrial railways which served the town during the period, much of which has since closed. Wigan began to dominate as a cotton town in the late 19th century and this lasted until the mid-20th century.

=== Irish connections ===
Wigan has had a large Irish community. Being almost equal distance from Liverpool and Manchester, it received high immigration rates of Irish people in the 1800s following the Great Famine (Ireland). Wigan's population, including the Ince and Pemberton townships, doubled from 39,000 in 1851 to 77,000 in 1881, with the immigration of Irish to the town the biggest factor. The Irish mainly settled in the central areas of the town, such as Scholes and Ince, with the area around Belle Green Lane referred to as Irishtown. St Patrick's church in Scholes was built in 1847 on the back of huge swathes of Irish immigration.

The local amateur rugby league club Wigan St Patricks has the Irish shamrock on the club badge with green and black being the club colours. The Wigan accent has even been affected by the great number of Irish coming to the town. The local word "moidered", known elsewhere as "mithered", is said to have derived from pronouncing the word mithered in an Irish accent. The Brian Boru Club in Ashton-in-Makerfield was established in 1889 and is the oldest Irish club in the UK.

=== 20th century ===
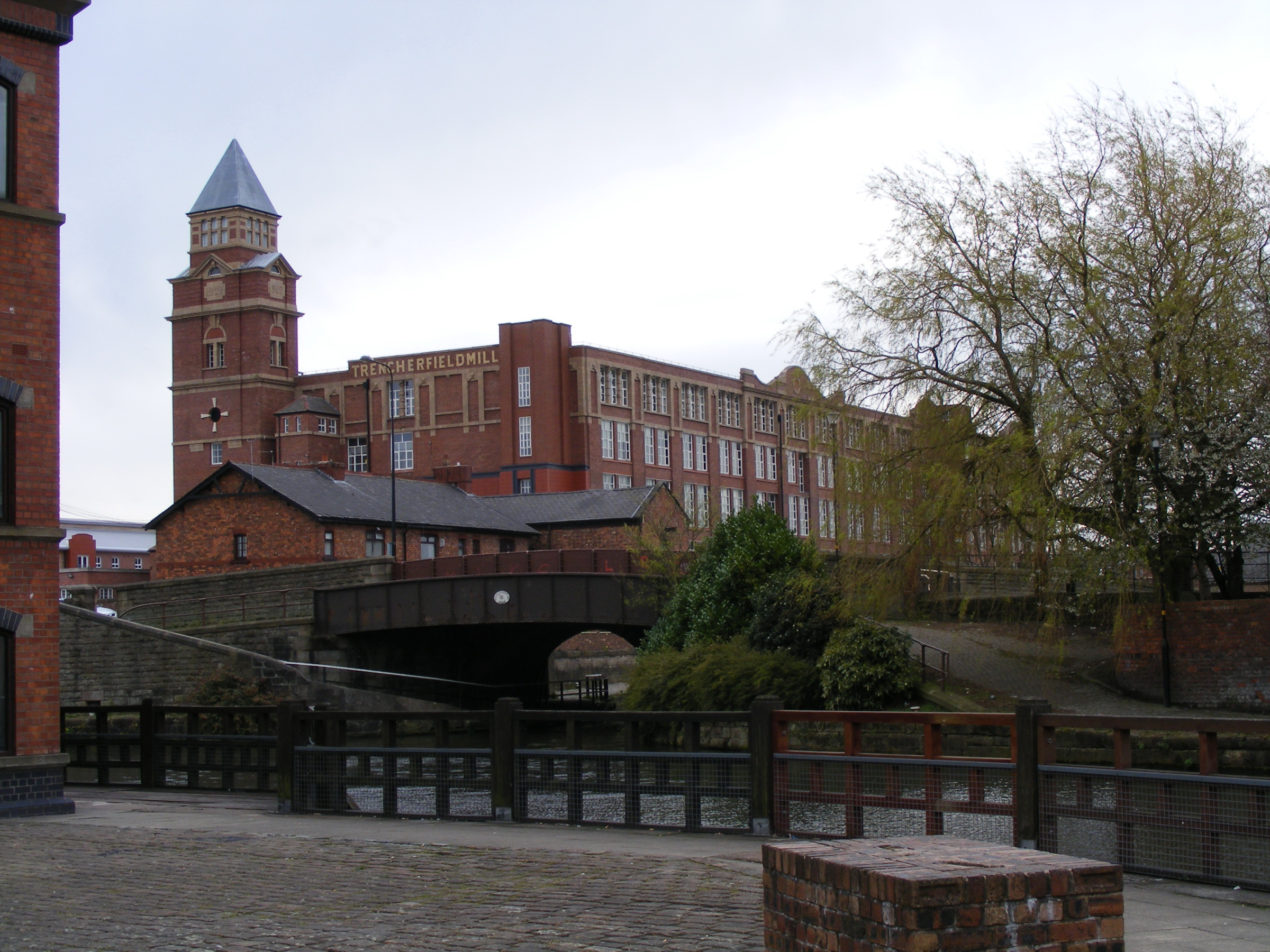
Trencherfield Mill is an example of one of Wigan's mills being converted for modern use.

In 1911, the town was described as an "industrial town...occupying the greater part of the township, whilst its collieries, factories...fill the atmosphere with smoke". After the Second World War, there was a boom followed by a slump from which Wigan's textile industry did not recover. While the town's cotton and coal industries declined in the 20th century, the engineering industry did not go into recession. The last working cotton mill, May Mill, closed in 1980.

In 1937, Wigan was prominently featured in George Orwell's The Road to Wigan Pier which dealt, in large part, with the living conditions of England's working poor. Some have embraced the Orwellian link, as it has provided the area with a modest tourist base over the years. Others regard this connection as disappointing, considering it an insinuation that Wigan is no better now than it was at the time of Orwell's writing.

== Governance ==
Since 2004, the town of Wigan has been divided between five of the 25 wards of the metropolitan borough, each returning three councillors to the 75-member borough council. The five wards are: Douglas, Pemberton, Wigan Central, Wigan West and Worsley Mesnes. The metropolitan council provides the local services.

At the Norman Conquest, the settlement of Wigan was part of the larger parish of Wigan, the majority of which was within the hundred of Newton. On 26 August 1246, Wigan was granted a Royal Charter, making the town a free borough. This happened after the granting of royal charters began in the 13th century, as a way of establishing corporations and defining their privileges and purpose. In Lancashire, Liverpool was granted in 1207, Salford in 1230, followed by Manchester in 1301. As a borough, Wigan was represented in the Model Parliament from 1295 to 1306 by two burgesses – freemen of the borough. The Charter allowed taxes to be made on transactions made in the borough by tradesmen and permitted the local burgesses to establish a guild that would regulate trade in the borough. Non-members of the guild were not allowed to do business in the borough without permission from the burgesses. It is thought that when the Charter was reconfirmation in 1350 it was changed, allowing the election of a mayor of Wigan for the first time. Three burgesses were elected to be presented to the lord of the manor who would choose one man to be mayor for a year.

The seal of Wigan was in use from the 17th century until 1922

There was a rivalry between the lords of the manor and borough. The lord of the manor complained in 1328 that the burgesses were holding private markets, from which he gained no revenue. The rivalry continued in the 16th century, with Bishop Stanley unsuccessfully challenging the right of the burgesses to hold markets, believing it should be the right of the lord of the manor. In 1583, the corporation of the borough attempted to usurp the lord of the manor by laying claim to the lordship. They did so because they felt they were fulfilling the duties of the lord: to improve waste and common land and allowing construction on this land, running courts, and mining coal. A compromise was reached, dividing some power between the two parties.

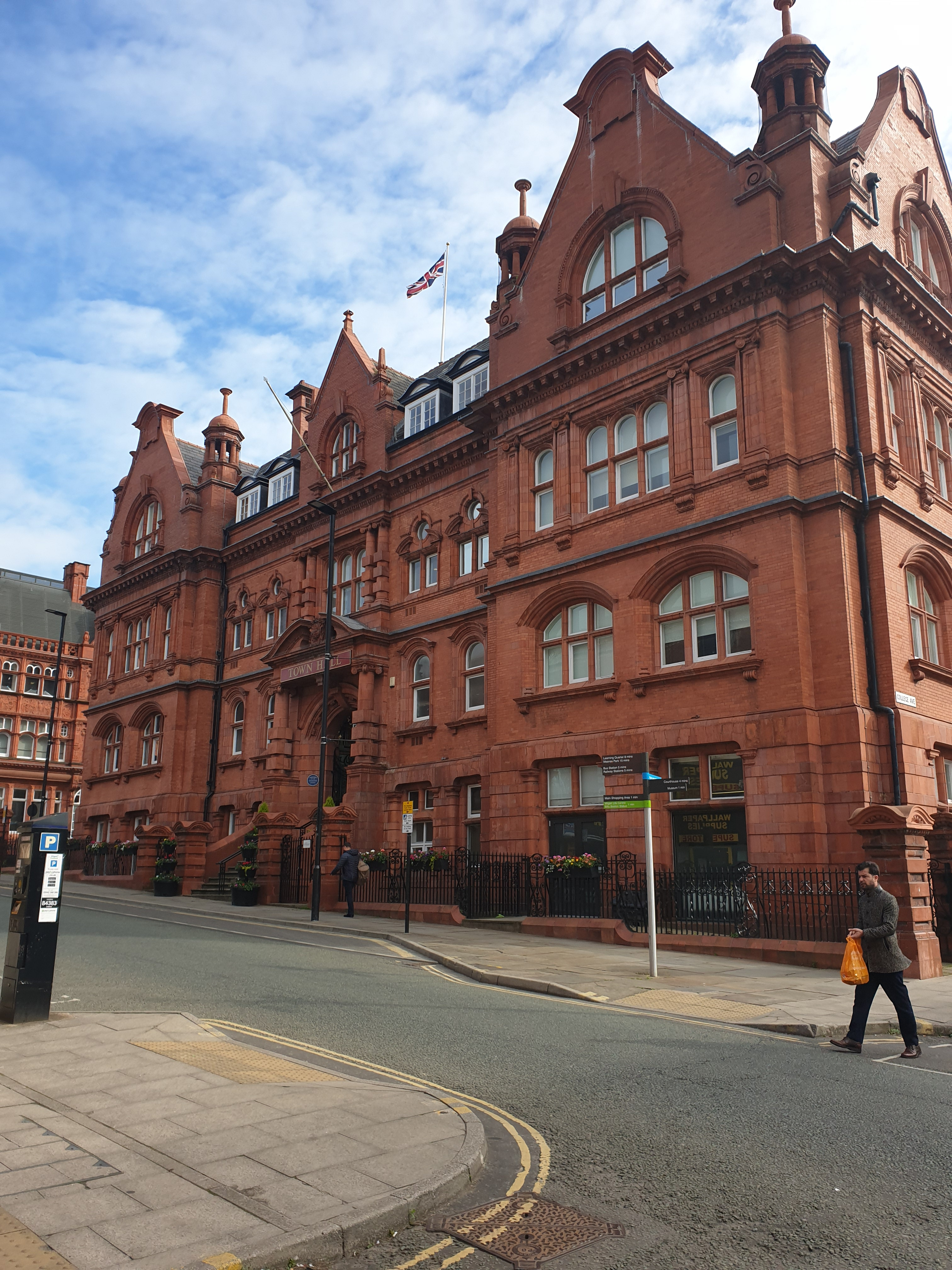
Wigan Town Hall

Under the Municipal Corporations Act 1835, the town was reformed and was given a commission of the peace. The borough was divided into five wards with a town council of 40 members: two aldermen and six councillors representing each ward. Rectors from the local parish church were the lords of the manor since records began until 2 September 1861. On this date, the borough corporation bought the rights associated with the lordship. The Local Government Act 1888 constituted all municipal boroughs with a population of 50,000 or more as county boroughs, exercising both borough and county powers. Wigan accordingly became a county borough on 1 April 1889, giving it independence from Lancashire County Council. Ward boundaries were altered, and the county borough was divided into ten wards, each electing one alderman and three councillors. The former area of Pemberton Urban District was annexed to the County Borough of Wigan in 1904, adding four extra wards to the borough.

In 1974, the County Borough of Wigan was abolished and its former area became part of the Metropolitan Borough of Wigan. The current Wigan Town Hall was opened by the Princess of Wales in November 1991. In April 2011, the borough along with the entirety of the county of Greater Manchester became one of 10 constituent councils of the Greater Manchester Combined Authority.

The town is in the Wigan Parliamentary constituency, which was recreated in 1547 after having covered the borough in the late 13th century. From 1640 until the Redistribution of Seats Act 1885, the constituency returned two MPs; from then on, it had only one. Since 1918, the constituency has been represented by the Labour Party. Lisa Nandy is the incumbent MP for Wigan, having first been elected in the 2010 general election.

Wigan Council takes part in the town twinning scheme and in 1988 twinned with Angers in France.

== Geography ==
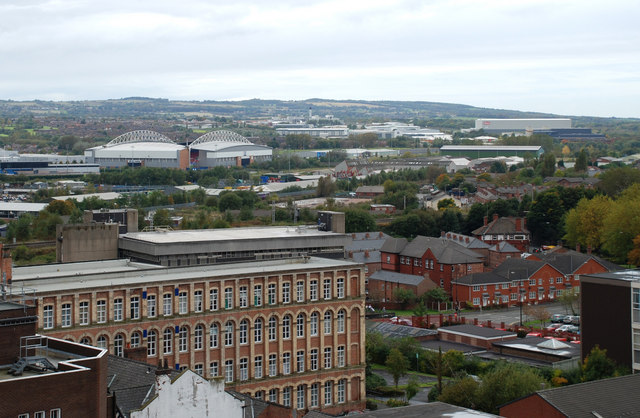
Aerial view of Wigan town centre

Wigan lies (Note: The town centre lies at 53°32′41″N 2°37′54″W (53.5448, −2.6318).) to the west and north of Hindley and Ashton-in-Makerfield, and is about 16 miles (26 km) north-west of Manchester city centre, 8 miles (13 km) west of Bolton and 10 miles (16 km) north of Warrington.

The historic town of Wigan forms a tightly integrated conurbation along with the Metropolitan Borough of Wigan districts of Orrell and Ince-in-Makerfield; this is connected by ribbon development to Standish and Abram. These areas, together with the West Lancashire town of Skelmersdale, are defined by the Office for National Statistics as the Wigan Urban Area, with a total population of 166,840. The town is part of the Manchester Larger Urban Zone.

== Demographics ==
Wigan ethnicity compared
| 2001 UK census | Wigan | Wigan (borough) | England |
|---|---|---|---|
| Total population | 81,203 | 301,415 | 49,138,831 |
| White | 98.8% | 98.7% | 90.9% |
| Asian | 0.4% | 0.4% | 4.6% |
| Black | 0.1% | 0.2% | 2.3% |

According to the Office for National Statistics, at the time of the 2001 United Kingdom census, Wigan had a population of 81,203. The 2001 population density was 11,474 inhabitants per square mile (4,430/km^{2}), with a 100 to 95.7 female-to-male ratio. Of those over 16 years old, 28.9% were single (never married) and 45.0% married. Wigan's 34,069 households included 29.7% one-person, 38.9% married couples living together, 8.5% were co-habiting couples, and 10.8% single parents with their children. Of those aged 16–74, 38.5% had no academic qualifications, a figure significantly higher than the average for the borough as a whole and England.

In 1931, 9.4% of Wigan's population was middle class compared with 14% in England and Wales and, by 1971, this had increased to 12.4% compared with 24% nationally. Parallel to this slight increase in the middle classes of Wigan was the decline of the working class population. In 1931, 38.7% were working class compared with 36% in England and Wales; by 1971, this had decreased to 33.5% in Wigan and 26% nationwide. The rest of the population was made up of clerical workers and skilled manual workers or other miscellaneous. The slow decrease in the working class goes against the trend for a steeper national decline, reinforcing the perception of Wigan as a working-class town.

At the 2001 UK census, 87.7% of Wigan's residents reported themselves as being Christian, 0.3% Muslim, 0.2% Hindu and 0.1% Buddhist. The census recorded 6.2% as having no religion, 0.1% had an alternative religion and 5.4% did not state their religion. The town is part of the Anglican Diocese of Liverpool and the Roman Catholic Archdiocese of Liverpool.

Population growth in Wigan since 1901
| Year | 1901 | 1911 | 1921 | 1931 | 1939 | 1951 | 1961 | 1971 | 1981 | 1991 | 2001 | 2011 | 2019 |
|---|---|---|---|---|---|---|---|---|---|---|---|---|---|
| Population | 82,428 | 89,152 | 89,421 | 85,357 | 81,662 | 84,560 | 78,690 | 81,152 | 88,901 | 85,819 | 98,438 | 103,363 | 107,732 |
County Borough 1901–1971 • Urban Subdivision 1981–1991 Understanding towns in England and Wales: population and demography 2001-2019

== Economy ==
Wigan population compared
| 2001 UK Census | Wigan | Wigan (borough) | England |
|---|---|---|---|
| Population of working age | 59,215 | 220,196 | 35,532,091 |
| Full-time employment | 40.7% | 41.7% | 40.8% |
| Part-time employment | 12.7% | 11.9% | 11.8% |
| Self-employed | 5.3% | 6.2% | 8.3% |
| Unemployed | 3.7% | 3.2% | 3.3% |
| Retired | 14.0% | 13.7% | 13.5% |

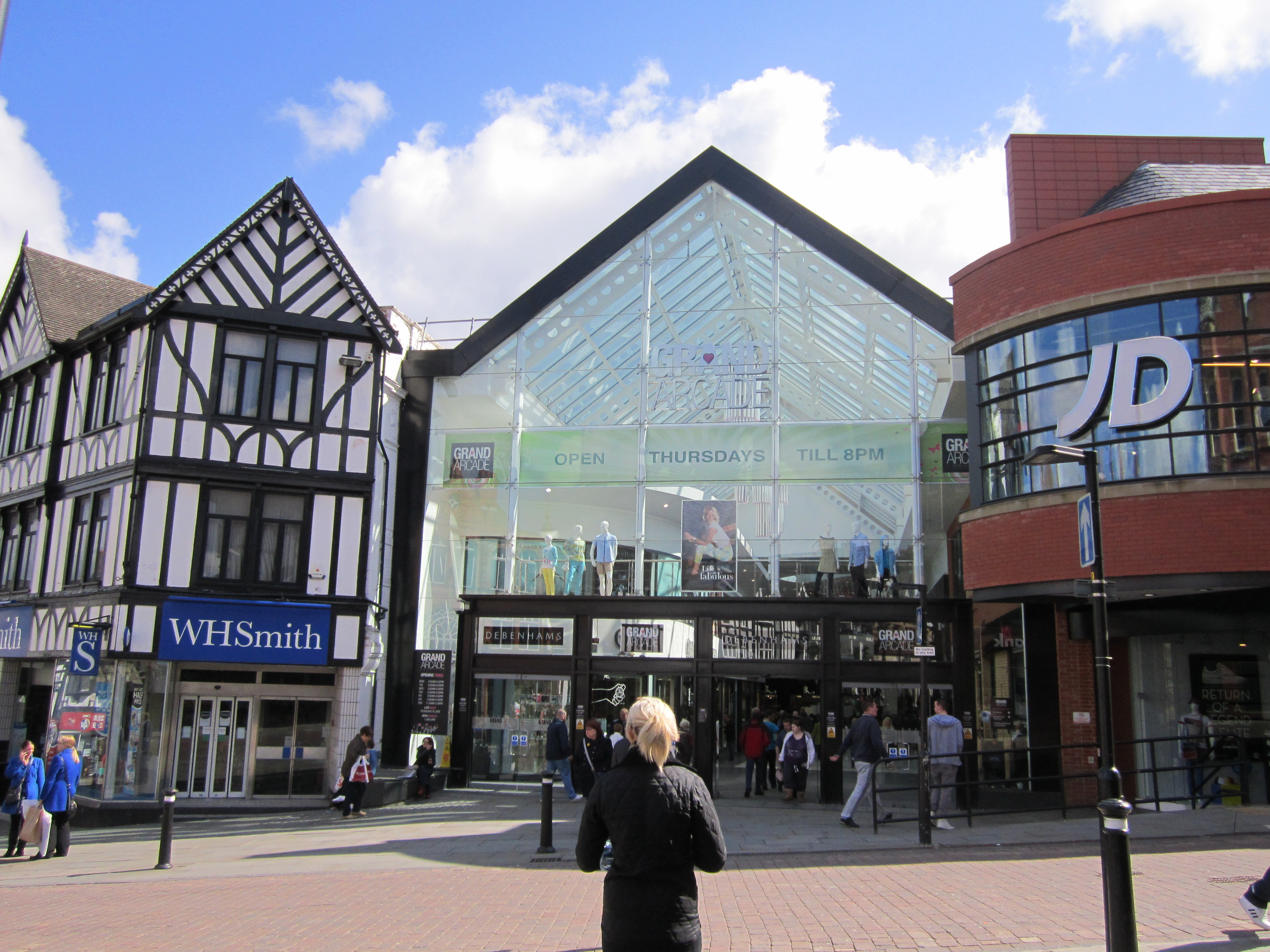
The Grand Arcade Shopping Centre

The following large employers are based in Wigan:

- The Grand Arcade shopping centre was opened on 22 March 2007. Construction, which cost £120 million, started in 2005 on the site of Wigan Casino and The Ritz. The area around the pier is planned to be redeveloped, in a multi-million pound project rebranding the area as the Wigan Pier Quarter. Plans for the redevelopment of the area have been in place since 2006. Trencherfield Mill, at the centre of the pier development, has been refurbished and used for apartments and office space.
- The Wigan Life Centre south building opened on 19 September 2011, housing office accommodation for Wigan Council, Wigan Leisure and Culture Trust and NHS Ashton, Leigh and Wigan, Wigan Library and a swimming pool and fitness suite, with a walk of fame, "Believe Square", for local public figures and groups. Plans for the 18-storey Tower Grand, which would have been the tallest building in Wigan, were scrapped after the 2008 financial crisis. The Galleries Shopping Centre, which houses shops as well as an indoor market, was bought for £8 million by the council in 2018, as part of a regeneration plan due to long-term decline.
- The former Westwood power station site was redeveloped in 2006 into the Westwood Park business park and features a large amount of Wigan MBC office space. However, plans for a £125 million 55-acre (22 ha) textiles centre on the site with 1,000,000 square feet (93,000 m^{2}) of manufacturing and research space, in co-operation with the Chinese state-owned trading company Chinamex, fell through.
- The Tote chain of bookmakers has its headquarters in Wigan, providing about 300 jobs in the town.
- H. J. Heinz is amongst the largest food manufacturers in Europe. Their 55-acre (22 ha) food manufacturing facility in Wigan is the largest food processing facility in Europe.
- JJB Sports, a former nationwide sports clothing retailer, was founded in Wigan as a sports shop by John Jarvis Broughton (later JJ Bradburn) and was bought and expanded by businessman Dave Whelan.
- DW Sports Fitness another nationwide sports retailer and fitness business, owned by Dave Whelan, is headquartered in the town.
- The bakery chain Galloways Bakers, and William Santus & Co. Ltd, the confectioner and producer of Uncle Joe's Mint Balls, are both based in Wigan.

According to the 2001 UK census, the industry of employment of residents aged 16–74 was 22.4% retail and wholesale, 18.8% manufacturing, 10.2% health and social work, 8.6% construction, 8.0% property and business services, 7.4% transport and communications, 6.5% education, 5.2% public administration, 4.1% hotels and restaurants, 2.7% finance, 0.7% energy and water supply, 0.4% agriculture, 0.1% mining, and 4.8% other. Compared to national figures, Wigan had high rates of employment in retail and wholesale (16.9% in England) and manufacturing (14.8% in England), and relatively low levels of employment in agriculture (1.5%). The census recorded the economic activity of residents aged 16–74, 1.9% students were with jobs, 2.9% students without jobs, 5.9% looking after home or family, 10.2% permanently sick or disabled, and 3.2% economically inactive for other reasons.

== Landmarks ==
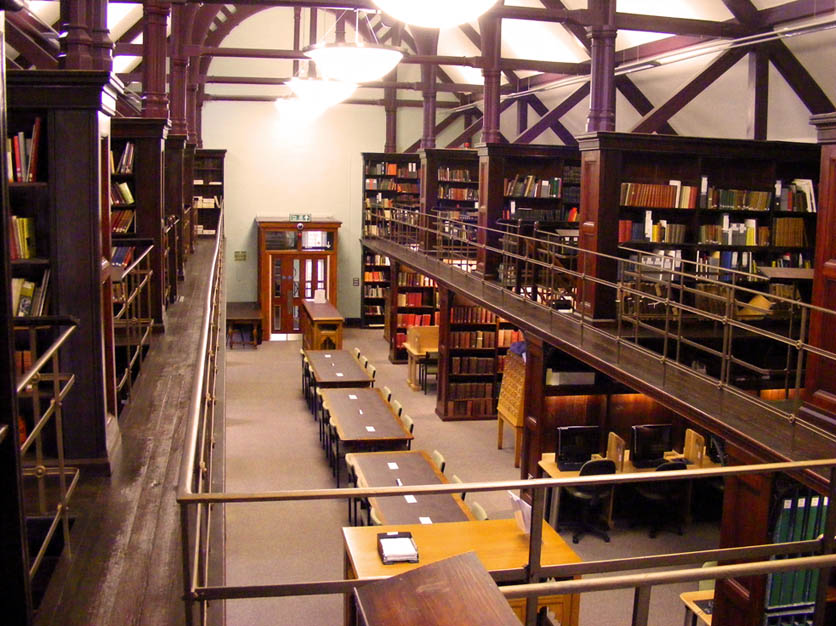
Museum of Wigan Life

There are 125 listed buildings in Wigan out of the 216 listed buildings in the wider borough with nine at Grade II* in the town. As well as being a Grade II* listed structure, Mab's Cross is the only Scheduled Monument in Wigan itself, out of the 12 in Wigan Borough. It is a medieval stone cross that probably dates from the 13th century. There is a legend surrounding the cross that Lady Mabel Bradshaigh, wife of Sir William Bradshaigh, did penance by walking from her home, Haigh Hall, to the cross once a week barefoot for committing bigamy. There is no evidence the legend is true, as there is no record that Lady Mabel was married to anyone other than Sir William Bradshaigh, and several facets of the story are incorrect. Haigh Hall was built in 1827–1840 on the site of a medieval manor house of the same name, which was demolished in 1820. The hall is surrounded by a 250-acre (101 ha) country park, featuring areas of woodland and parkland. The former town hall was a Grade II listed building.

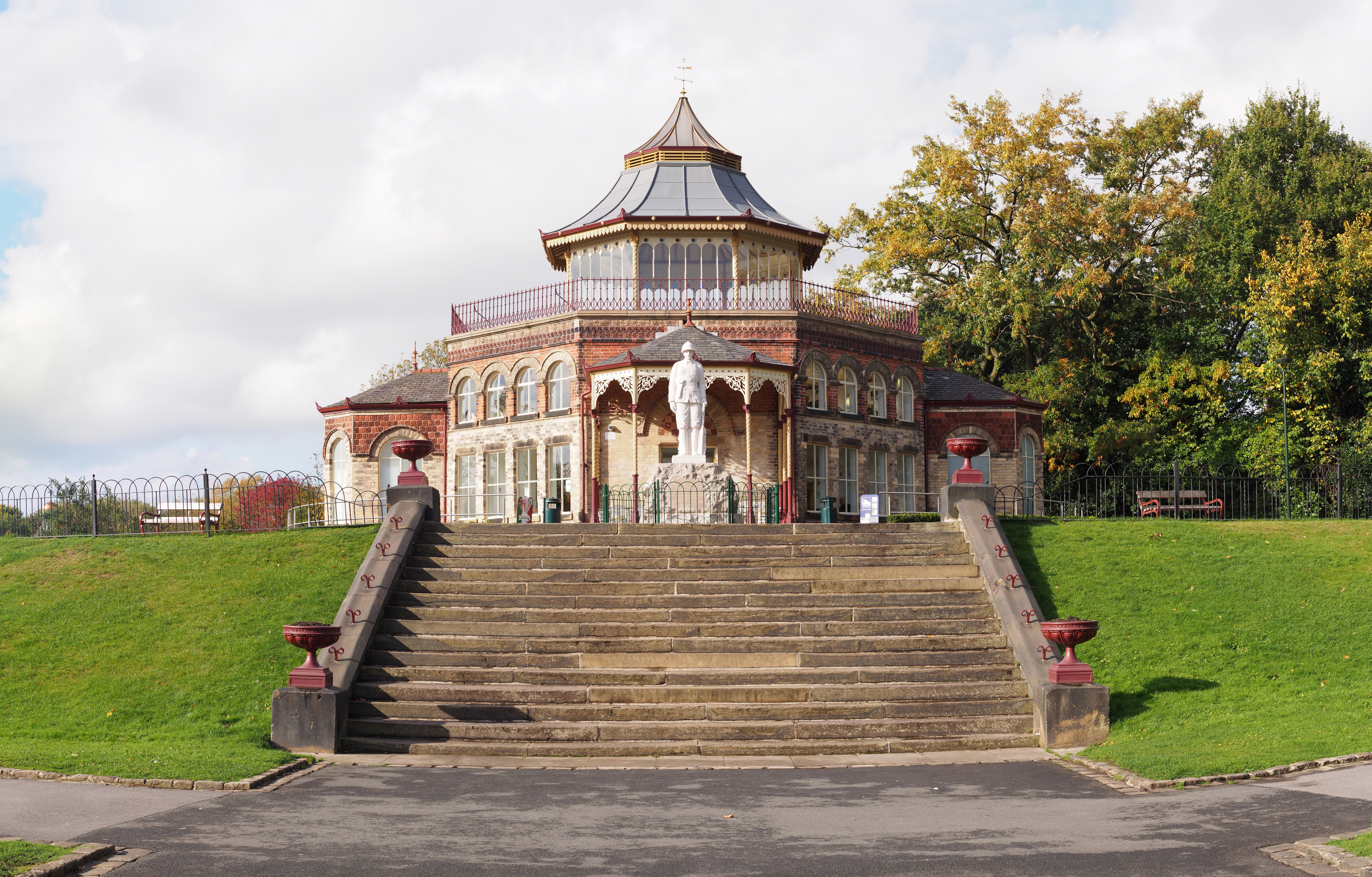
The Boer War memorial in Mesnes Park

Designed by John McClean, Mesnes Park was opened in 1878; McClean was chosen to design the park through a competition. There is a pavilion in the centre and a lake. The Heritage Lottery Fund donated £1.8 million to regenerate the park and Wigan Metropolitan Borough Council added £1.6 million to that figure. The pavilion and grandstand will be restored. The 20-acre (8.1 ha) Mesnes Park is north-west of Wigan town centre. It receives two million visitors a year and used to host the Wigan One World Festival.

In 1925, Wigan War Memorial was unveiled. Designed by Giles Gilbert Scott and funded through public donations, the monument is now a Grade II* listed building and commemorates the fallen soldiers from the town in the First World War and other conflicts. In 2006 the plaques bearing the names of the dead were stolen; a year later they were replaced through council funding. There is also a memorial on Wigan Lane which marks the site where Sir Thomas Tyldesley died in 1651 at the Battle of Wigan Lane.

The former Wigan Central Library opened in 1878 and is now the Museum of Wigan Life. A one-year restoration programme began in 2009 costing £1.9 million. George Orwell used it to research The Road to Wigan Pier. As of 2019, the Wigan Pier Quarter is at the heart of a regeneration programme that began in 2006 to revitalise the area. Part of Wigan's industrial heritage, Trencherfield Mill was built in 1907 and is a Grade II listed building. It houses a steam engine over 100 years old which was restored with help from the Heritage Lottery Fund. The quarter is also home to the Wigan Pier Theatre Company, which was founded in 1986. The Face of Wigan, located in the town centre since 2008, is a stainless steel sculpture of a face. Created by sculptor Rick Kirby, The Face stands at 18-foot-tall (5.5 m) and cost £80,000.

== Education ==
Wigan and Leigh College, a further education college with over 8,000 total students, has three campuses in Wigan: Parsons Walk Centre, Wigan School for the Arts and the Engineering & Construction Centre of Excellence (Pagefield Centre). There is also Wigan UTC, a university technical college, in the town centre. In the wider borough, there are two sixth form colleges, St John Rigby College and Winstanley College. High schools in the town are the Deanery High School, St. John Fisher Catholic High School, St. Peter's Catholic High School, Hawkley Hall High School and Rose Bridge Academy in Ince, with more throughout the borough. Wigan Grammar School was established in 1597 and closed in 1972.

== Transport ==
=== Railway ===
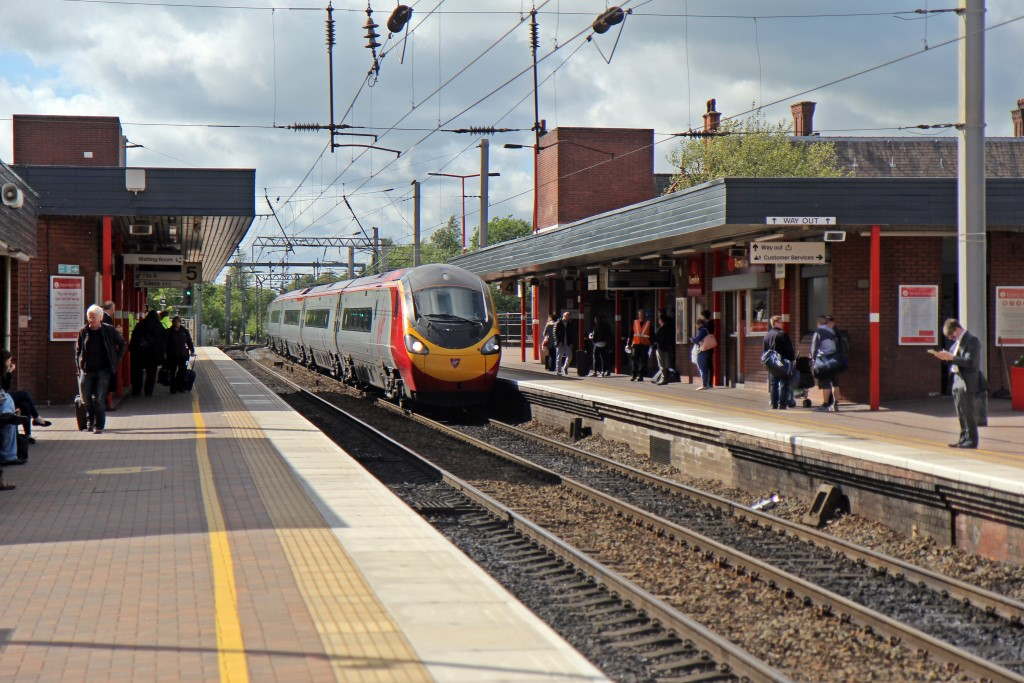
A Pendolino unit at North Western station

There are two railway stations in the town centre:

- Wigan North Western lies on the north-south electrified West Coast Main Line. Avanti West Coast operates inter-city services to London Euston, Birmingham New Street, Lancaster, Carlisle, Edinburgh Waverley and Glasgow Central. Northern Trains operates trains to Preston and Blackpool North and a regular local service along the line to St Helens Central and Liverpool Lime Street.
- Wigan Wallgate serves lines running east and west through the town. Northern Trains operates routes to Southport and Headbolt Lane, with connections to Liverpool Central and the Merseyrail network. Frequent local services also operate to Bolton and Manchester Piccadilly, with most trains continuing through to other destinations such as Manchester Airport, Stockport and Rochdale.

=== Buses ===
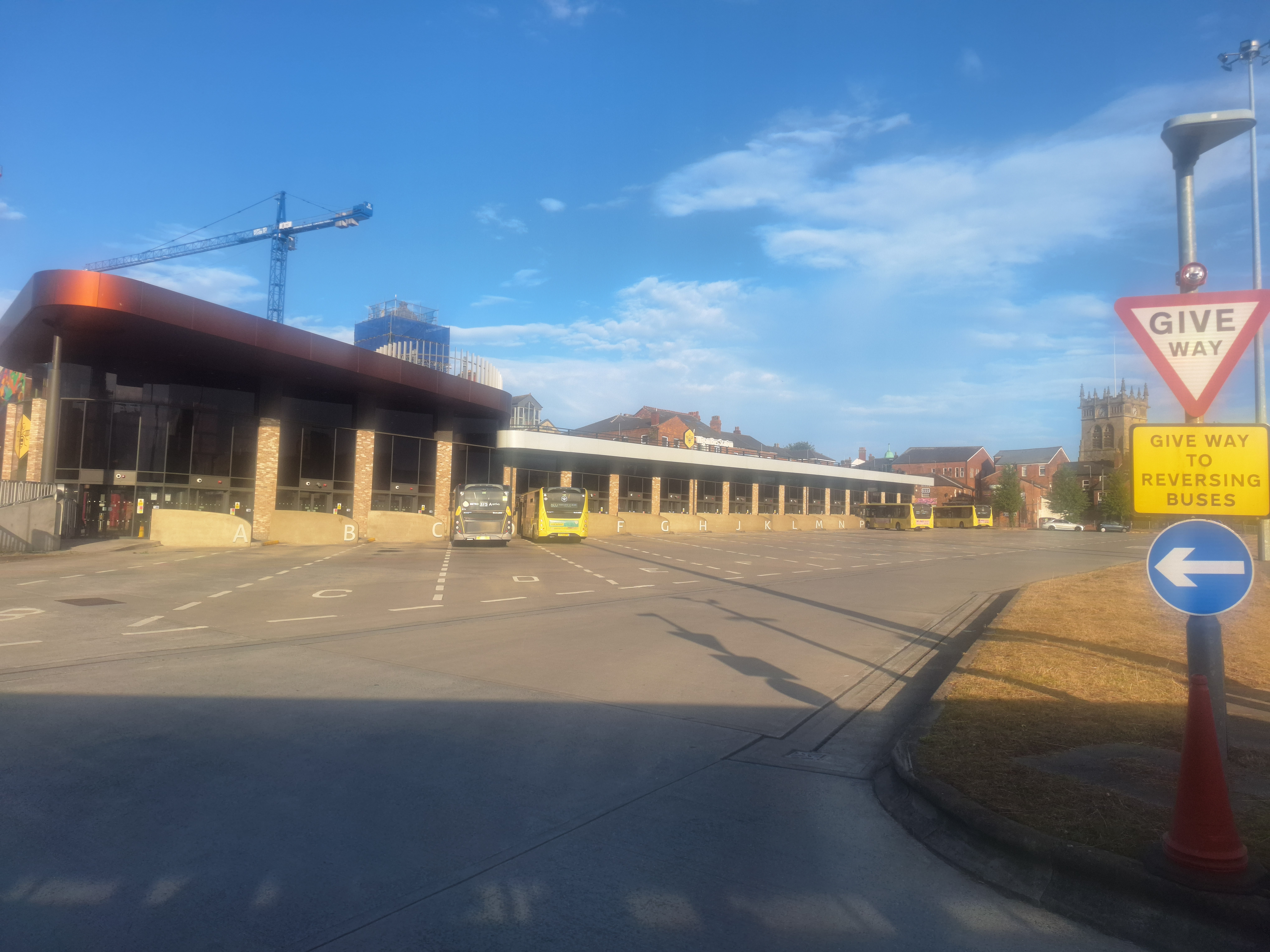
The redeveloped bus station

Wigan bus station reopened in late 2018 after a £15.7 million, two-year redevelopment. Local bus routes are co-ordinated by Transport for Greater Manchester (TfGM), under the Bee Network brand. Wigan's bus services were included in the first tranche of TfGM franchises, with services tendered to bus operator Go North West launching in the town on 24 September 2023. Diamond Bus North West, Vision Bus and Stagecoach Manchester also operate franchised routes in the borough. Other operators are Arriva Merseyside, Holmeswood Coaches and Warrington's Own Buses.

Routes connect the town with Bolton, Chorley, Ormskirk, Preston, St Helens, Skelmersdale, Southport, the Trafford Centre and Warrington. Local routes run to Appley Bridge, Ashton-in-Makerfield, Golborne, Hindley, Leigh, Pemberton, Shevington and Standish. National Express long-distance coach services serve the borough.

=== Roads ===
Wigan lies on the meeting point of two primary A roads, the A49 and A577, which link to the M6, M61 and M58 motorways. Increased traffic in recent years, encouraged by retail development, has resulted in very congested main roads for most of the day. This situation is linked to the town's geography, with river valleys and railway lines impeding road improvement.

=== Canals ===
Wigan lies on the Leeds and Liverpool Canal, and is epitomised by Wigan Pier. There is also a branch of the canal from Wigan to Leigh, with a connection to the Bridgewater Canal linking Wigan to Manchester.

=== Tramway ===
A horse tramway was built in 1880 by the Wigan Corporation and leased to a succession of private companies to operate services to Pemberton, Aspull and towards Standish. Steam tram operation was introduced quickly, but the network always struggled to pay its way and just after the start of the 20th century Wigan Corporation gradually bought the operating leases and converted the network to electric tramcar operation. However, the network was saddled with a mix of standard gauge and narrow gauge lines, reducing efficiency and increasing costs; the last of the Wigan Corporation Tramways were closed in 1931 to be replaced by buses, which had begun as 'feeder' services to the trams but which had shown themselves to be faster and more flexible. Trolleybuses were operated on a single route from Wigan to Martland Mill from 1925 to 1931.

The town's tram, trolleybus and bus fleet was always painted in crimson and off-white colours, with ornate gold lining out until the outbreak of World War II. The buses were notable in that they never carried exterior advertisements, with the town's crest occupying the space between decks where other bus operators placed adverts; they carried two green lights on the front, to enable the town's ratepayers to see at night which was one of the town's own buses and not one of those of a competitor. At local government reorganisation in April 1974, the Wigan Corporation Transport Department became part of Greater Manchester Transport.

== Culture ==
=== Music ===
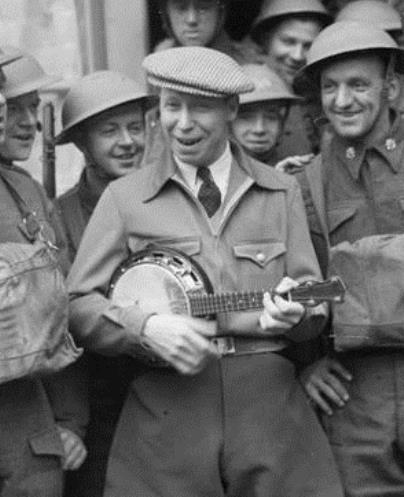
George Formby Jr in France during WWII

Wigan has been well known for its popular music since the days of George Formby Sr and George Formby Jr. It was the birthplace of the Eight Lancashire Lads, a dancing troupe who gave the young Charlie Chaplin his professional debut. One member of the troupe was John Willie Jackson, the "John Willie" to whom George Formby would often refer in his songs. Local bands that gained wider repute include the Verve, the Railway Children, Witness, the Tansads, Limahl of Kajagoogoo and Starsailor. The Verve were one of the most important British rock groups of the 1990s, finding success in the UK and abroad. The band was formed when the members met at Winstanley College in 1989. In 2021, the Lathums continued the town's popular music tradition by scoring a UK number one with their debut studio album How Beautiful Life Can Be and Torpedo Pig that split in 2019.

From 1973 to 1981, Wigan Casino was the location for Wigan's weekly Northern Soul all-nighters. The venue began as a dance hall called Empress Ballroom. Wigan Casino rose to prominence in the 1970s and, in 1978, it was named the "best disco in the world" by Billboard, an American music magazine. The building was gutted by fire in 1982 and was demolished the following year. This was the inspiration for the 1989 dance record Wigan by Baby Ford.

Since 1986, Wigan has hosted an international jazz festival. Wigan remains a centre of popular music for young people, with a number of alternative pubs and clubs in the town centre. The town also had a music collective which existed to promote the scene and help out local musicians and bands; they host activities such as recording sessions and gig advice for young musicians. Throughout the early 1990s, The Den was a popular venue for bands with acts such as Green Day heading over to play. A local tradition since the 1980s is Boxing Day fancy dress which, in recent years, has received national media coverage.

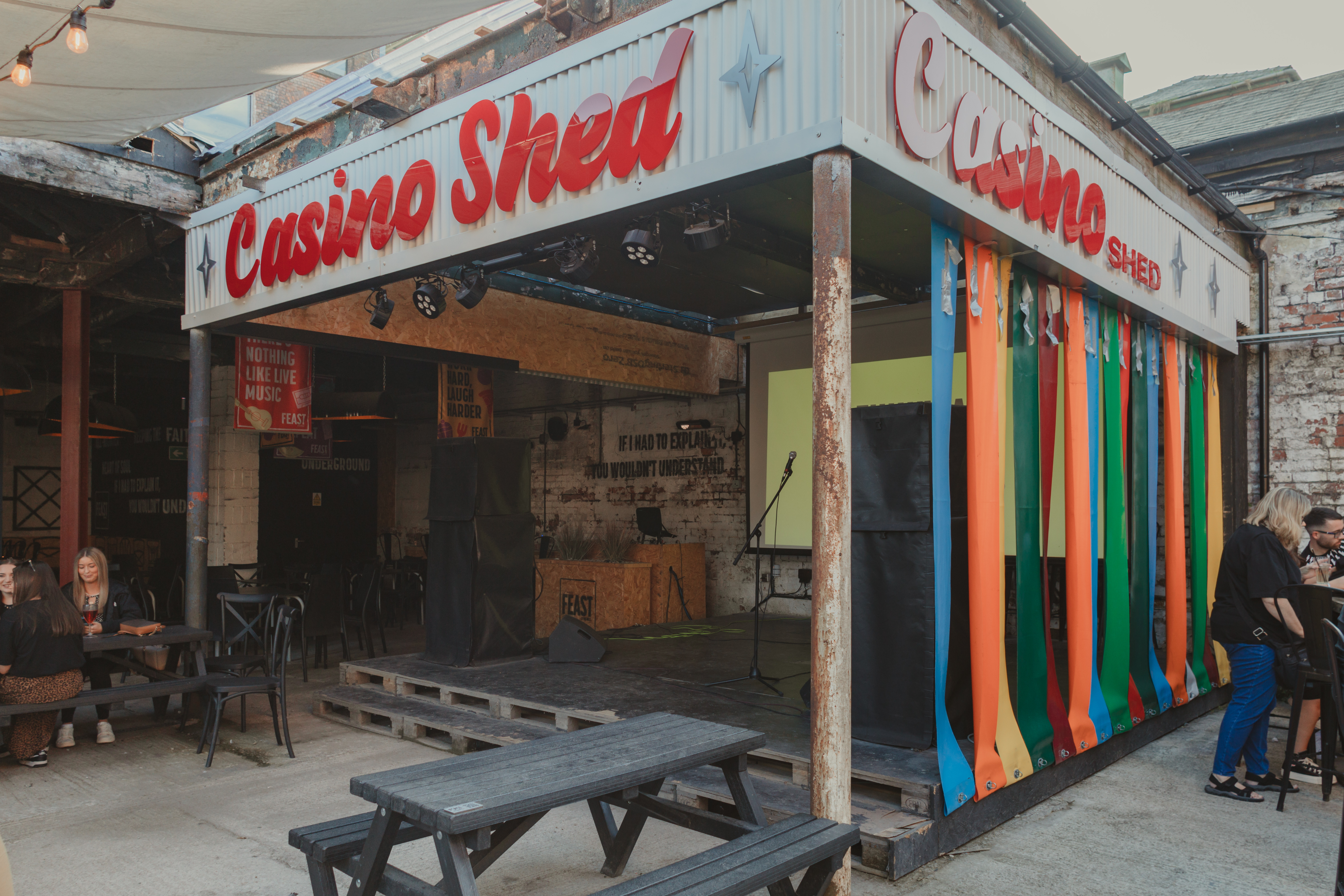
The colourful Casino Shed Stage (named after Wigan Casino) at the Wigan Food & Events venue Feast at The Mills

From 2002, the annual Haigh Music Festival was held at Haigh Hall, Wigan, which attracted around 7,000 guests each year. In 2011, Haigh Fest ended due to funding issues. Since 2012, the free Wigan Live Festival, held in the town centre, has taken its place.

The town currently has a host of venues putting on gigs for upcoming local bands, including Feast at The Mills, The Boulevard, The Old Courts and The Swinley. NXNW has hosted the annual Wigan Festival of Art, Music and Literature known as North By North Western Festival. The collective is a voluntary non-profit making organisation and the festival takes place at various venues across the town.

=== Other cultural facilities and events ===
Wigan Little Theatre is a community theatre, a charitable, voluntary organisation that was founded in 1943.

Since 2010, the Wigan Diggers Festival has taken place on the second Saturday of September. The festival brings together a significant number of socialist organisations and sympathetic musicians to celebrate the life, ideas and influence of the Wigan-born, Gerrard Winstanley, founder of the Diggers (True Levellers) Movement. Recent headliners have included significant Wigan bands The Railway Children and Merry Hell.

Wigan hosts an annual beer festival ran by CAMRA, which is usually held indoors at Robin Park Leisure Centre, opposite the Brick Community Stadium. As of its 2026 event it had been running annually for 38 years, and has over a selection of over 100 real ales, traditional and flavoured ciders, perries, craft/keg beers, and gins.

Wigan is also home to the annual World Pie Eating Championship, which is usually held at Harry's Bar on Wallgate. The competition has been held since 1992 and, in 2006, a vegetarian option was added. Wiganers are sometimes referred to as "pie-eaters"; the name is said to date from the 1926 General Strike when Wigan coal miners were starved back to work before their counterparts in surrounding towns and so were forced to metaphorically eat "humble pie". A local dish is the Pie Barm, also known as a Wigan Kebab, consisting of a buttered barm cake sandwiching a meat and potato pie inside. Wigan is also the home town of the local confectionary Uncle Joe's Mint Balls.

In the television series Wallace and Gromit, the title characters live at the fictional 62 West Wallaby Street in Wigan.

== Media ==
Local news and television programmes are provided by BBC North West and ITV Granada. Television signals are received from the Winter Hill TV transmitter.

The town is served by both BBC Radio Merseyside and BBC Radio Lancashire. Other radio stations include Capital North West & Wales, Central Radio North West, Heart North West, Smooth North West, Greatest Hits Radio Wigan & St Helens (formerly Wish FM) and Countywide Radio, a community based station that broadcast from the town.

The local newspaper is the Wigan Post.

== Sport ==
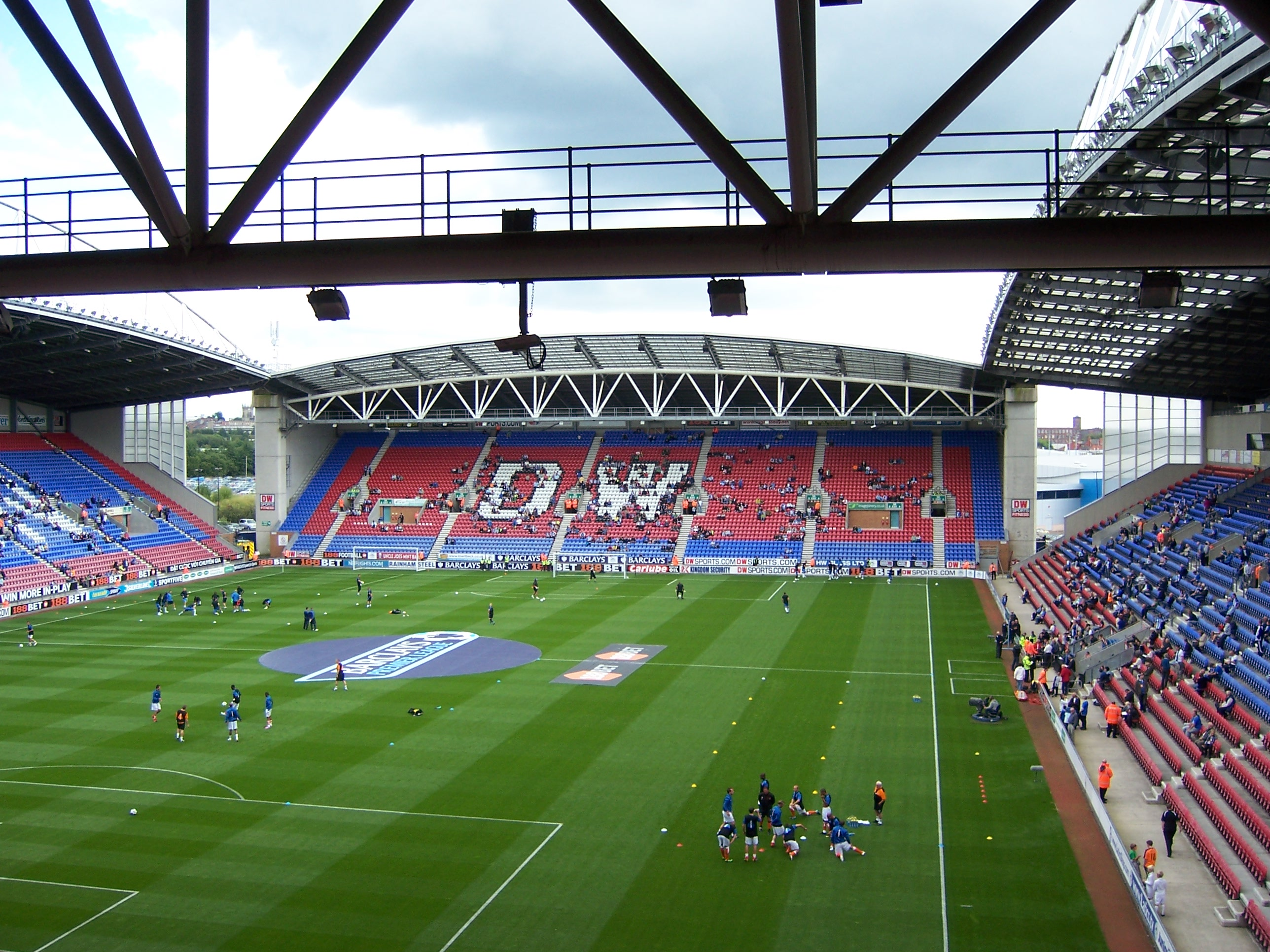
The Latics and Warriors share the same stadium

The 25,138-capacity DW Stadium (Note: Now known as the Brick Community Stadium, it was originally called the JJB Stadium.) is located in the Newtown area and is shared by association football club Wigan Athletic and rugby league club Wigan Warriors. The Latics moved into the stadium upon its completion in 1999 from their former home, Springfield Park. The Warriors also moved into the stadium in 1999 from their previous home, Central Park.

The 1,200-capacity multi-use Robin Park arena is located next to the DW Stadium.

=== Rugby League ===
Rugby League has been played in the town since 1862.

The town's most famous club is Wigan Warriors, originally Wigan FC, were formed out of the Wigan Cricket Club in 1872 to provide a sport to play during the winter months. The club, who reformed in 1979 as Wigan Wasps before reverting to Wigan FC two years later, were one of 22 clubs involved in the rugby football schism of 1895, which split from the Rugby Football Union to form the Northern Union. The club played at Central Park for most of its history before moving into a ground share agreement with Wigan Athletic at the newly built JJB Stadium in 1999. The Warriors suffix came into their name in two years prior in 1997, shortly after rugby league had switched to a summer sport in 1996. The club is the most decorated in the sport's history and most successful club in England winning 24 league championships, 21 Challenge Cup titles, as well as being crowned World Club Challenge champions on five occasions. The club have played in the top tier of British rugby league through their existence with the exception of a single relegation in 1980.

Liverpool Stanley were a professional rugby league club formed in the Highfield area of Wigan in 1902 as Wigan Highfield. The club didn't stay long in Wigan, having relocating around England several times.

Blackpool Borough played briefly at Wigan Athletic's Springfield Park from 1987 to 1988 under the name Springfield Borough.

Amateur rugby league is popular in the town, with Wigan St Patricks, Wigan St Judes and Ince Rose Bridge all playing in the National Conference League, the amateur game's top level.

=== Football ===
The sport struggled initially to take hold in Wigan, with non-league clubs Wigan County (1897–1900) and Wigan Town (1905–1908) both folding within a few years of their creation. Wigan Borough, emerged from the amateur side Wigan United (1896–1914), in 1920 and became the town's first club to play in the Football League when in 1921 they became founder members of the Football League Third Division North. The club left the Football League and folded in 1931. They were replaced a year later by Wigan Athletic, the town's current professional football club.

Wigan Athletic was elected to the Football League in 1978 and was promoted to the Premier League, the top division of English football, in 2005. The club were relegated to the Championship in 2013, the same season they won the 2013 FA Cup, defeating Manchester City 1–0 in the final. In 2020, the club went into administration but was later taken over by new owners. As of the 2023–24 season, the club play in League One, having been relegated from the Championship the previous season.

The semi-professional football team Wigan Robin Park also played in the town between 2005 and 2015.

=== Other sports ===
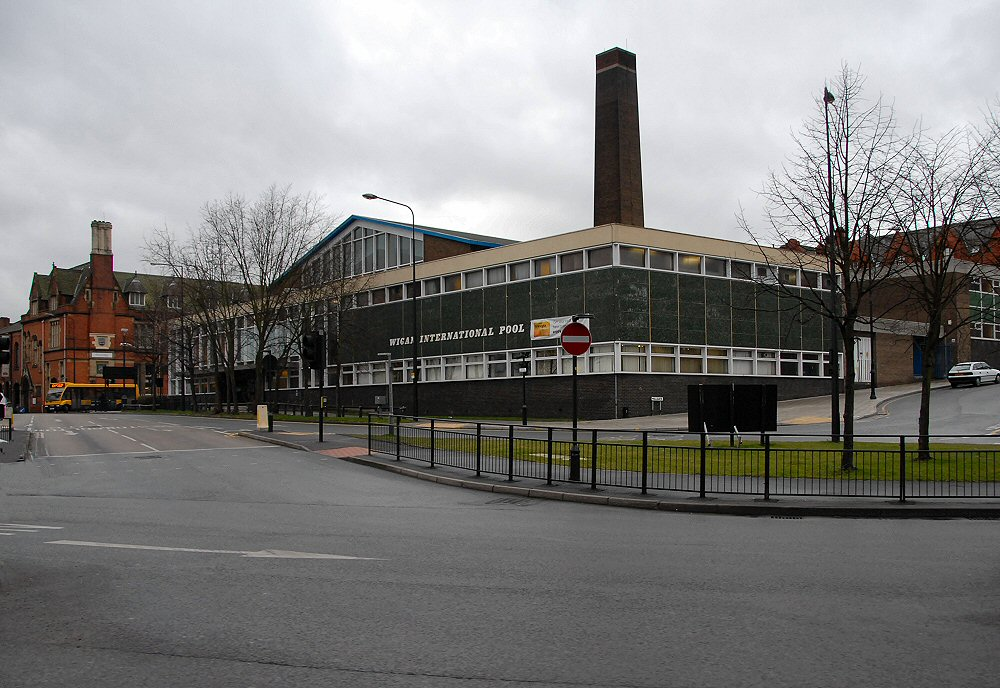
Wigan International-standard pool, demolished 2008

- The town was historically known as a centre for wrestling in Britain. It was home to the Snake Pit, one of the world's most prominent catch wrestling gyms, founded by professional wrestler Billy Riley. The school has since moved to neighbouring Aspull and the original building was demolished after a fire. The Snake Pit has since held competitions in Wigan, including the British and World Championships for catch wrestling.
- Amateur club Wigan R.U.F.C. represents the town in rugby union.
- Wigan's international-standard swimming pool was demolished in 2008. A new 25-metre (82 ft) pool opened in September 2011 in the Wigan Life Centre development. The original 50-metre (160 ft) pool was built in 1966 at a cost of £692,000 (£11.3 million as of 2025), Wigan BEST, named Wigan Wasps until 2004, is the town's swimming club. It has produced Olympic standard swimmers, including medal winner June Croft.
- Wigan Wheelers, a cycling club established in 1919, is based in the town.
- Wigan has staged motorcycle speedway and greyhound racing at two venues. The Poolstock Stadium was the home of Wigan Speedway in 1947. The team moved to Fleetwood in 1948, although they raced at Poolstock in 1960. The Woodhouse Lane Stadium was used briefly in the early 1950s when the team was known as the Panthers.
- Wigan Warlords is an Inline Hockey team.
- The district badminton league consists of 30 teams across three divisions.
- Wigan Sailing Club operates from the 69-acre (28 ha) Scotman's Flash in Poolstock less than a mile from the centre of the town.
- Wigan & District Motor Club, formed in 1973 by motorsports enthusiasts, runs stage rallies at Three Sisters Circuit.
- American football club Wigan Warhawks compete in the BAFA flag league in the MEC Central division. In 2016, the Warhawks made the playoffs in their rookie season and lifted their first silverware in 2017, winning the Coventry Cougars Charity Tournament.

== See also ==
- Coat of arms of Wigan
- Earl of Crawford
- List of mills in Wigan
- List of mining disasters in Lancashire
- Listed buildings in Wigan
- Mayor of Wigan
- Wigan (fabric).
