= Believe Square =

Public walkway in Wigan, England

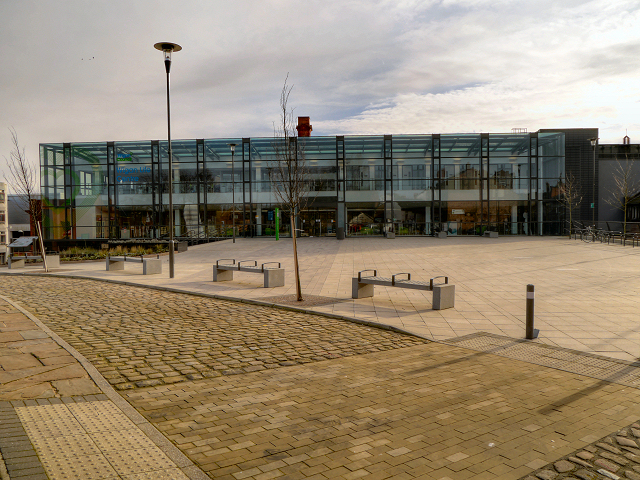
- Interactive map of Believe Square
- Coordinates: 53.546°N 2.631°W

Construction
- Completion: 2012

Believe Square is a public space in Wigan, Greater Manchester, England, situated by Wigan Town Hall, and is the site of the town's Walk of Fame, known as the Believe Stars. Established in 2012, Wigan Council honours individuals and organizations, embodying Wigan's "Believe" mantra, with a star, on the basis of their contributions to society and the community.

== Architecture ==
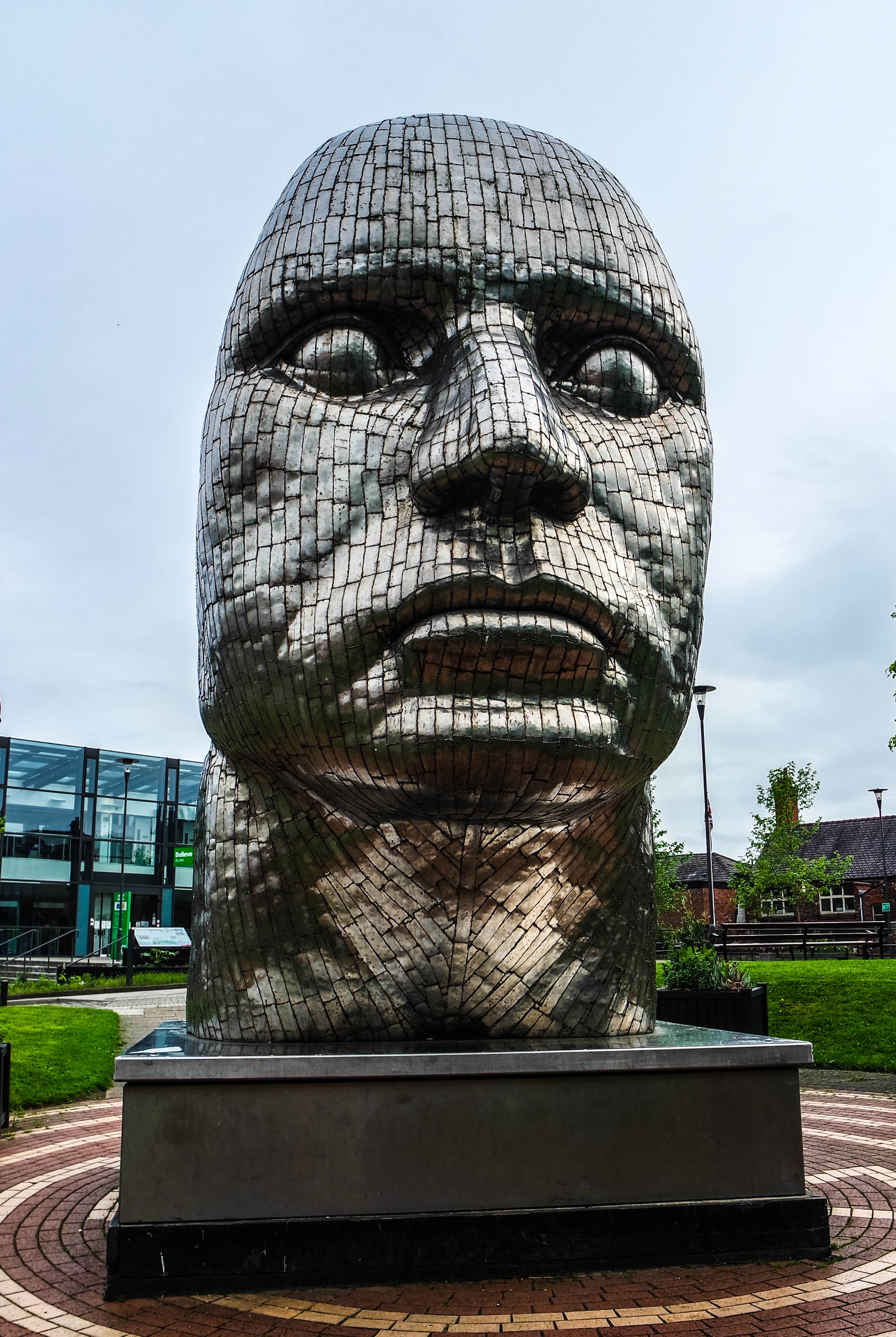
The 18ft tall Face of Wigan sculpture by Rick Kirby erected in 2008

The square is the site of the Face of Wigan, a 2008 sculpture by artist Rick Kirby. The piece features a steel face, with facets reflecting the Wigan community and its hinterland.

== Wigan Life Centre ==
The Wigan Life Centre on the square is a hub for education, the arts, and leisure, as well as the site of civic offices. The Life Centre adjoins Wigan Metropolitan Borough Council, on the site of the former Wigan International Pool. Opened in 2011, as a consolidate public services hub. The Life Centre consists of two main buildings: the North and South sites. The North site houses a library and neighbourhood support facilities, the South site's "Healthy Living Zone", focuses on leisure and health services, including a 50-metre (160 ft) swimming pool, a gym, and fitness studios.

The hub is used for education, employment, and healthy-living programs.

== Believe ==
The "Believe" mantra has been associated with the local sports teams of Wigan since the early 2010s. In 2013, Wigan Athletic F.C. won the 2012–13 FA Cup, and the Wigan Warriors rugby league club won the Super League Grand Final. The "Believe" slogan developed from then. A related town square, Civic Square in Leigh, Greater Manchester is also the site of Believe Stars.

== Notable Inductees ==
Individuals and groups awarded stars on Believe Square include:

- John Winnard MBE (2012) - Co-owner of Uncle Joe's Mint Balls
- Stuart Maconie (2012) - Writer and broadcaster
- Billy Boston MBE (2012) - Rugby league legend.
- Jenny Meadows (2012) - middle-distance runner
- Dave Whelan (2013) - Former owner of Wigan Athletic F.C..
- Ian McKellen (2015) - Acclaimed actor.
- NHS and Key Workers (2021) - Following the COVID-19 pandemic.
- Joseph's Goal (2022) - Non-ketotic hyperglycinemia (NKH) charity.
- Joining Jack (2023) - Duchenne muscular dystrophy charity.
- Wigan Youth Zone (2023) - A boys and girls club.
- Keely Hodgkinson (2023) - Olympian
