= Culcheth and Glazebury =

Civil parish in Cheshire, England

Coordinates: 53.452°N 2.522°W

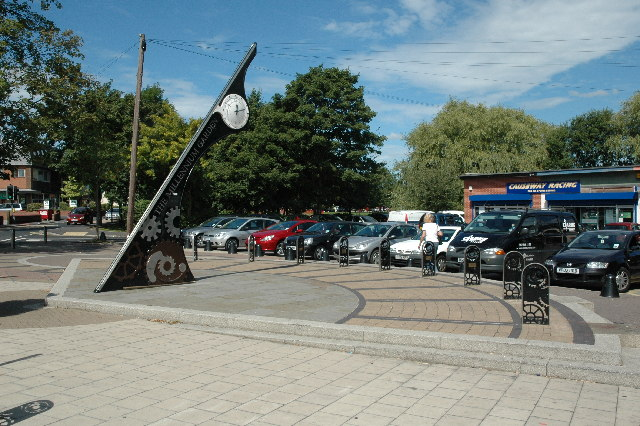
- The sundial in the centre of Culcheth

- Location within Cheshire
- Population: 8,534 (2001)
- OS grid reference: SJ6595
- Civil parish: Culcheth and Glazebury
- Unitary authority: Warrington
- Ceremonial county: Cheshire
- Region: North West
- Country: England
- Sovereign state: United Kingdom
- Post town: WARRINGTON
- Postcode district: WA3
- Dialling code: 01925
- Police: Cheshire
- Fire: Cheshire
- Ambulance: North West
- UK Parliament: Warrington North

Culcheth and Glazebury is a civil parish in Borough of Warrington, Cheshire, England. At the 2001 census, it had a population of 8,534.

== Culcheth ==
Historically part of Lancashire, the area was dense woodland until the Norman conquest, hence the village gets its name from the Celtic for "narrow wood".

Bronze Age pottery discovered at Croft suggests the area was inhabited 4,000 years ago.

The Culcheth family played an important role in shaping village fortunes. Gilbert de Culcheth was lord of the manor of Culcheth and built its first hall in 1200. He was survived by a son Hugh de Gilbert and four daughters. Hugh de Gilbert was murdered by a group of twelve angry men in 1246, leaving no male heir. This saw the land divided between daughters Margery, Elizabeth, Ellen and Joan. However, equality was unheard of and land could not be passed down to women. The responsibility for the girls went to the Baron of Warrington who married off all the girls to his four sons. Eldest girl Margery, married Richard who took the name de Culcheth to ensure its survival. Each couple lived in their own sector of the Manor – Culcheth, Holcroft, Risley and Peasfurlong. Religion played an important role. As Catholics during the Reformation, services took place under complete secrecy in the family chapel which priests would enter through a secret passage by the fireplace in the great hall, and exit at a secluded spot on the tree-lined drive. The Culcheths supported Charles I in the Civil War, whilst their neighbours and enemies the Holcrofts backed Cromwell and the Parliamentarians. The Culcheth name died out with Thomas Culcheth (who died in 1747) being the last. He had no heir, so the hall passed to his cousin Thomas Stanley and then to John Trafford, which is where the family line ends.

The Holcroft family also have some notoriety for a scandal involving the daughter of Lt-Col John Holcroft of Holcroft Hall, who was an officer in Cromwell's army. His daughter, Maria, married Irishman Lieutenant Thomas Blood against Holcroft's wishes. They married on 16 June 1650 in Newchurch before moving to Ireland. At the end of the civil war, Cromwell promoted Blood to the rank of captain. Three years later he was elevated to Commissioner of Parliament. Blood is most famous for devising a plot to steal the Crown Jewels from the Tower of London and using them as a ransom for Charles II. In 1671 he and Maria disguised themselves as a parson and his wife. They visited the keeper of the jewels and Maria pretended to faint to cause a distraction. The keeper unlocked the Crown Jewels and, to his amazement, was seized and held in the strongroom. Just as Blood and his accomplice were leaving, the plan was hindered yet again since they were caught before even getting out of the grounds of the Tower. The King took pity on Blood and, after serving a short sentence, he was returned to Ireland and his estate, where he and Maria lived on a £500-a-year allowance.

The lordship of the manor of Culcheth and Culcheth Hall were latterly owned by the Withington family. The hall was demolished after the Second World War, and the estate has been developed as residential housing by Adam Lythgoe (Estates) Ltd.

== Glazebury ==
Hurst Hall

Before the Civil War, Glazebury was part of Culcheth, and known as Hurst because of Hurst Hall. It was formerly the seat of the Holcroft family, before the Adamsons lived there during the 19th and early 20th centuries. Anthony Emery in Greater Medieval Houses of England and Wales, 1300–1500: East Anglia, Central England and Wales commented upon Hurst Hall's four-bay hall, although most of the medieval structure was demolished in 1975; it is now the site of a garden centre.

The village name is unusual as the ending "bury" in English place names usually signifies a fortified place. However Hurst became known as Glazebury in a different way. In the 17th century Civil War combatants were buried in a road which became known as Bury Lane (now part of Warrington Road) and Glazebury is believed to take its name from a combination of bury and the word glaze from the nearby Glaze Brook. The brook also acts as the boundary between Glazebury and Astley.

The village has a parish church, primary school and cricket club amongst other facilities, along with it being the home of Bents Garden Centre.

Glazebury has more pubs than shops. There are a number of walks around the village to Windy Bank Wood and Crow Wood. The A580 East Lancashire Road crosses the far north of the village, at its border with Wigan Borough, linking the village with Liverpool, St Helens and Manchester.

== See also ==
- Listed buildings in Culcheth and Glazebury
