= John Holcroft (16th-century MP) =

Sir John Holcroft (died 1560) of Holcroft Hall, Culcheth, was a soldier, politician, and landowner of the Tudor period. He was returned twice as a member of the English parliament for Lancashire.

== Background ==
The date of John Holcroft's birth is not known, although it is known that he was born by 1498. He was the eldest son of John Holcroft of Holcroft: the remains of Holcroft Hall are close to the Glaze Brook, east of Culcheth, 53°27′06″N 2°29′04″W. Holcroft's mother was Margaret Massey, daughter of Hamnett or Hamlet Massey of Rixton, which lies a few miles to the south of Holcroft, on the River Mersey. The Masseys also had lands in the township of Pennington.

The Holcrofts were minor landed gentry. The manor of Holcroft had come into being after Gilbert de Culcheth was murdered in 1246, leaving four infant daughters as heirs. As wards of William le Boteler, lord of Warrington, their marriages were sold to Hugh de Hindley, who married them to his own four young sons and divided the estate among them. Holcroft, along with Peasfurlong and Risley, was hived off the original manor of Culcheth. Joan de Culcheth married Thomas de Hindley and took Holcroft. They or their successors seem to have adopted the name Holcroft, although little is known of the estate's history until the early 16th century, when John Holcroft senior was lord. Sir John Holcroft's generation were the first of the family to attain regional and national eminence.

His younger brother, Sir Thomas Holcroft, was to become rather wealthier and more prominent than himself, mainly through speculation in former monastic lands, building up a substantial estate around the estates of the former Vale Royal Abbey. Their sister Margaret married James Gerard, a younger son of another minor but rising Lancashire gentry family, and became the mother of Sir Gilbert Gerard, an important Elizabethan lawyer. By 1519, John Holcroft was married to Anne Standish, daughter of Ralph Standish of Standish.

Holcroft's early career is slightly hazy, not least because his father and eldest son were both called John, and the father's dates are uncertain, so it has proved impossible to disentangle their participation in events definitively. When Edward Stanley, 3rd Earl of Derby, raised troops in 1536, a John Holcroft answered the call, but it is not certain which. However, John Holcroft was certainly pricked as High Sheriff of Lancashire for 1537–38. This appointment, important but not always welcome, suggests he was now notable at a county level, and possibly possessed of his own fortune.

== Landowner and official ==
It is likely that Holcroft had inherited the family estates by 1537, when he was first appointed sheriff. His importance locally was confirmed by his appointment as Justice of the Peace for Cheshire in 1539 and for Lancashire at some time over the next two years. He served as High Sheriff of Cheshire during 1541–42, and for Lancashire again in the following year. He held the Cheshire shrievalty for a second time in 1546–47.

During these years, Holcroft became involved in his brother's schemes to profit from the Dissolution of the Monasteries. Together they were appointed receivers for the lands formerly belonging to Lenton Priory, a Cluniac house at Nottingham. The Valor Ecclesiasticus had valued the property at £387 10s. 10½d., well above the threshold of £200 set by the Suppression of Religious Houses Act 1535. However, unlike other larger houses, Lenton was neither surrendered voluntarily nor dissolved by the Second Act of Dissolution. Instead, a campaign of allegations and propaganda brought forth accusations of verbal treason against the prior, Nicholas Heath, eight of the monks and four labourers. They were tried and executed in 1538, while the priory was dissolved by attainder, with no pensions paid to any of the survivors. The Holcrofts moved in to receive the property on the king's behalf, presumably profiting greatly themselves: Thomas was notorious for his exploitation of monastic rents.

When the receivership of Lenton expired in 1545, John Holcroft was able, because of his services, to buy the site and lands of Upholland Priory in Lancashire for £345. The property of this Benedictine house had been valued at £78 12s. 9d. annually in 1536, so Holcroft's outlay represented a bargain: money he could recoup, given improved management, in a few years. In fact, he passed it on after two years to a cousin, Sir Robert Worsley. This apparently formed part of a deal in which Holcroft acquired Worsley's holdings in the township of Pennington, where he himself already land, thus enlarging and consolidating his estate there.

The colleges and chantries were following the monasteries into oblivion, although the process was slowed by the final illness of Henry VIII, and then accelerated again by fresh legislation after the Edward VI in 1547. This provided further opportunities for the Holcrofts to enrich themselves. In 1546, Thomas and John were jointly appointed commissioners for chantries in Lancashire, Cheshire and Chester. Even after Mary I came to the throne, bringing in a brief Counter-Reformation, monasteries and colleges were not restored and the process of disposing of their assets continued. In 1554 John was again appointed commissioner for chantries in Lancashire and Cheshire, this time with Staffordshire.

Wardships provided further avenues for enrichment. In July 1539 Holcroft obtained the wardships of William and Anne Radcliffe of Winmarleigh. The associated annuities totalled £23 2s.2d, although Holcroft seems to have been interested largely in profiting his family through their marriages. William was married to Holcroft's own daughter, Anne, but died in 1561, only a year after Holcroft himself. However, this left William's half-sister Anne as sole heiress to the Damhouse in Tyldesley and the manor of Astley, as well as Winmarleigh. She was already promised in marriage to Holcroft's nephew, Gilbert Gerard, the Attorney General for England and Wales, so the Winmarleigh estates were added to the growing Gerard fortune. In May 1545 Holcroft obtained the wardship of William Booth of Dunham Massey, with an annuity of £25, although he had to pay 400 marks for it. Booth was later to become a member of Parliament of a radical Protestant persuasion. While he seems to have married as he wished, his kinsman Edward Fitton was married to Holcroft's granddaughter, Alice, the sole heir of the younger Sir John Hopcroft.

== Soldier ==
With the accession of Edward VI in 1547, Holcroft was summoned to London for the coronation on 20 February and there knighted. The ceremonies were abbreviated because of the king's youth, and so Holcroft was not formally invested with the Order of the Bath, as originally planned. However, he and the others so treated were nevertheless regarded as Knights of the Bath (KB).

It is possible that it was Holcroft who had answered Derby's call to arms in 1536. However, it is certain that it was he who was joint commissioner for the musters with George Blagge for the 1547 phase of the Rough Wooing, the campaigns intended by the English to force a marriage between Edward VI and Mary, Queen of Scots. It is likely that Holcroft was actively involved in the campaign, like Blagge, who was knighted for his services. Holcroft's son, also John Holcroft, was knighted by Protector Somerset at Roxburgh during the campaign. A John Holcroft was appointed in 1557 to command 100 men with Richard Assheton of Middleton and others. It is possible this was the younger man.

== Parliamentary career ==
Holcroft was elected to Parliament for the first time as Knight of the Shire for Lancashire on 23 November 1554, the election, according to the indenture, being unanimous. All the county's freeholders were entitled to vote, but the numbers were in practice variable but low. Elections were held at Lancaster Castle, extremely inconvenient for most of the county's inhabitants.

The parliament had been called for November 1554 and was Mary's third. By this time Holcroft was a notable man in the county and may have had sufficient prestige and influence to secure his own election. However, he had powerful allies too. His brother Thomas, a close ally of Somerset, had been imprisoned after the Protector's fall, but was for the time being in favour with Mary, like other former Somerset supporters. He was also powerful in the Duchy of Lancaster, the most important institution in the government of Lancashire. Moreover, both of the brothers were on excellent terms with Edward Stanley, 3rd Earl of Derby, the most powerful of the local magnates, whom John was to name as mediator in his will. Holcroft was returned second in order of precedence to Sir Thomas Stanley, Derby's son, who had also represented the county in the previous parliament, elected in March of the same year. Stanley's success was clearly the result of his father's support.

The parliament assembled on 12 November. However, John Holcroft was found absent in the January sittings and informed against in the King's Bench. He was fortunate to avoid further problems, as the parliament was dissolved on 16 January 1555.

Holcroft was not elected to the parliament summoned later in 1555, but he was returned for Lancashire again in January 1558. It is not known whether he served the county any better on this occasion. The senior member was Sir Thomas Talbot, who was a relative of the Earls of Shrewsbury, and whose mother had married a Stanley. However Talbot died on 1 August 1558, leaving Holcroft as the sole representative of the county for the remaining three months of the parliament.

== Death ==
Probably foreseeing his impending death, Holcroft made his will on 2 December 1559. Most of his goods had already been divided up between his wife and children. The documentation relating to this was entrusted to Gilbert Gerard. He left an annuity of 40 shillings a year to Gerard, the sum of £5 to Sir William Gerard and a gown to Sir Thomas Stanley. Lest his family should quarrel, he promised The Earl of Derby £6 13s.4d. to act as mediator.

Holcroft died some time in 1560. He was buried at Newchurch, Culcheth, the local parish church where he had bought the tithes in 1539.

== Marriage and family ==
John Holcroft married Anne Standish. She was the daughter of Ralph Standish of Standish and Alice, daughter of Sir James Harrington of Wolfage. Anne's father, Ralph, was a fairly wealthy member of the landed gentry, with a considerable number of estates and churches across south and central Lancashire. After his death in 1538, the estates passed through difficult times, with two successors dying in quick succession. Only under Anne's young nephew, Edward, did stability return, although he was continually criticised as a recusant. Anne's mother, Alice Harrington was from a Northamptonshire family of considerably higher social status: Sir James was knighted at the coronation of Henry VII

John Holcroft and Anne Standish had a large number of children: at least 7 sons and 6 daughters. They included the following.

- Sir John Holcroft, the heir. He married Dorothy Bold and they left as heir a daughter:

- Alice Holcroft, who married Edward Fitton of Gawsworth Old Hall in Cheshire. They had a number of children, including:

- Mary Fitton, a notable courtesan.

- Anne Fitton, who married the politician John Newdigate.

- Richard, the heir.

- Edward, who inherited the estates on the death of his brother and became first of the Fitton baronets.

After the death of the 2nd Baronet, also called Edward, in 1643, the Fitton estates became the subject of protracted legal dispute. The Holcroft estates were purchased soon after, apparently from trustees, by another branch of the Holcroft family.

- Hamlet Holcroft, a younger son of John Holcroft and Anne Standish, married Isabel Clifton. They had a son:

- John Holcroft, who married Anne Heywood and had a son:

- Lt. Col. John Holcroft, a prominent politician of the mid-17th century. He represented Liverpool and became a Roundhead commander. He was able to recover the Holcroft estates, probably by buying them from the Fitton trustees. He married Margaret Hunt and they had a daughter:

- Maria Holcroft married Thomas Blood, who famously attempted to steal the Crown Jewels in 1671.

- Anne Holcroft, daughter of John and Anne, married the Winmarleigh heir and ward William Radcliffe, who died in 1561.
