= Bents Garden Centre =

Garden, home and leisure destination in Warrington, England

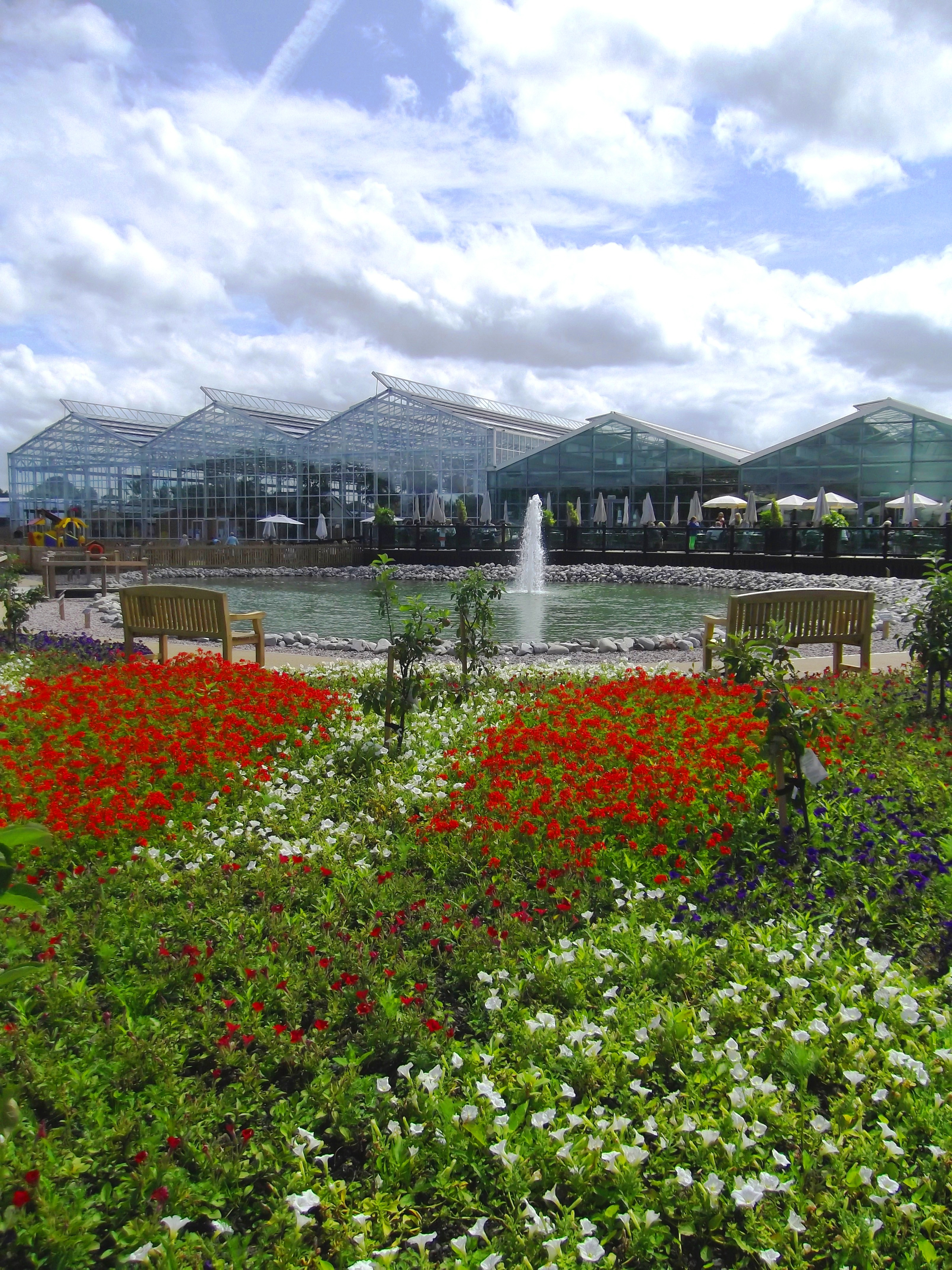
- Type: Private
- Industry: Gardening
- Founded: 1937
- Headquarters: Leigh End, Glazebury, Warrington, United Kingdom
- Key people: Ron Bent, Chairman and Matthew Bent, MD
- Website: bents.co.uk

Bents is a garden, home and leisure destination in Glazebury, Warrington, England, that attracts over a million visitors annually. Established in 1937 by Alfred and Margaret Bent, it remains a family-owned and family-operated business and has evolved into one of the UK's biggest garden centres.

== History ==
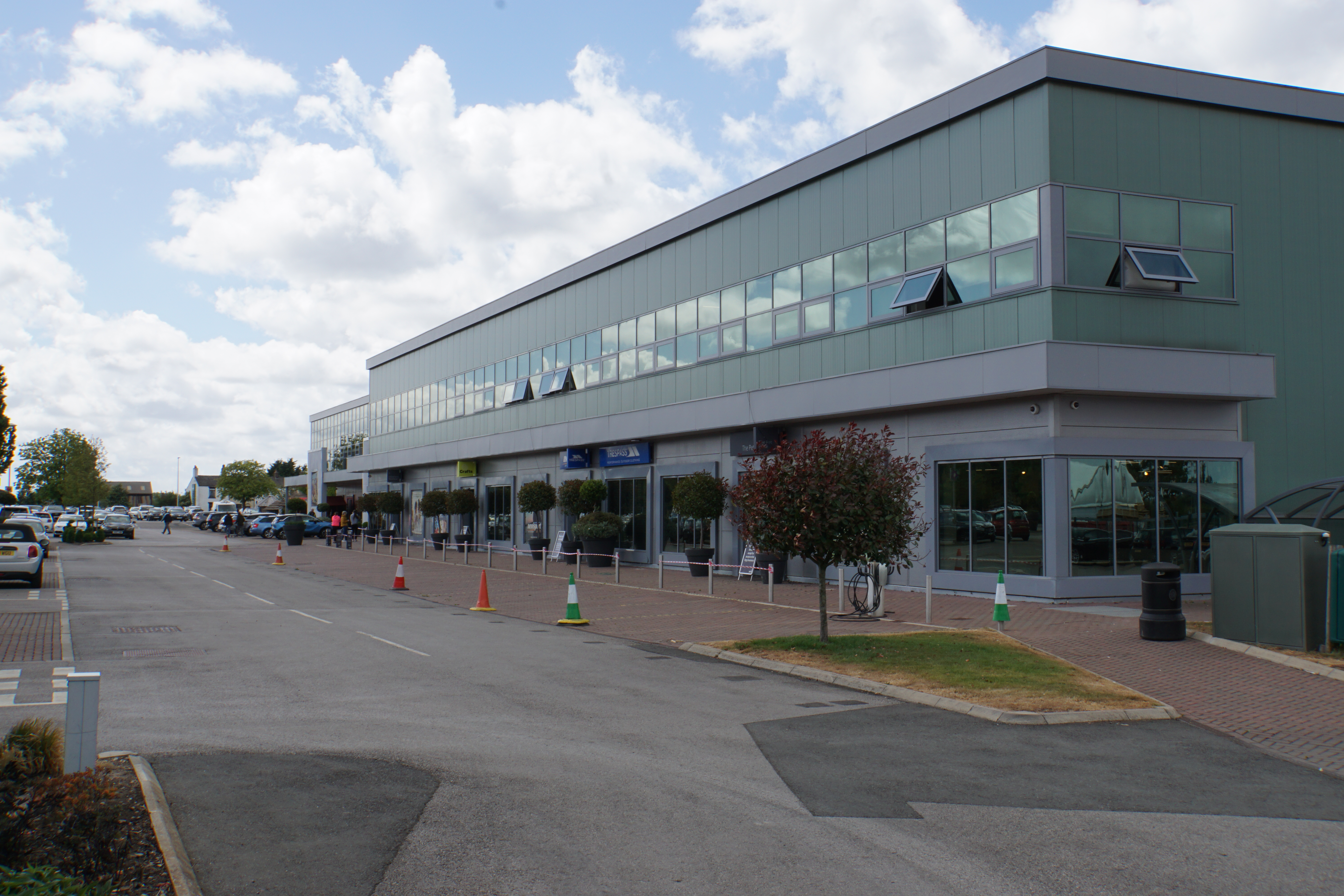
Entrance

The business can trace its origins back to 1937 when Alfred and Margaret Bent started selling their home-grown roses in the front garden of their terraced house in Glazebury, Warrington. Alfred was working at the local co-op at the time, but the garden business did so well that he and Margaret decided to rent a half-acre plot of land so that they could increase supply. Just as the business began to establish itself, the Second World War broke out and Alfred joined the war effort by taking a post with the fire service.

When the war was over, Alfred became ill with bronchitis and was advised by his doctor to take a permanent job outdoors. In the early 1950s, Alfred and Margaret purchased 16 acres (6.5 ha) of land allowing them to carry out the business they had created before the war, but on a larger scale. At this time, garden centres did not exist and the challenges were numerous, not least financial: everything was planted in either November to December or March to April and the revenue generated in the active months had to last all year round.

== Expansion ==
In the 1960s, the Bents bought an additional 44 acres (18 ha) adjacent to the site they already owned, giving the family 60 acres (24 ha) of land in total. In 1966 a small shop was opened, marking the beginning of a retail operation that would prove central to further growth. It was around this time that Alfred and Margaret's sons, Ron and John, joined the business and, along with Ron's wife Wendy, they presided over a period of expansion and diversification.

In 1982 Bents became one of the first garden centres in the country to open a café. The decision to add a catering facility came at a time of renewed expansion to create more indoor space. It was a bold move and would prove to be a significant step in the company's development and direction.

The business thrived and in 1995 underwent further expansion with additional space added on to the existing building. In 1998 almost all of the old garden centre buildings were demolished, replaced by new state-of-the-art continental style structures. Ron Bent's visionary approach to garden centre retailing was recognised in 2012 when he was awarded a lifetime achievement award by the garden retail industry.

== Recent years ==
The early 2000s saw the next generation of the Bents family become involved in the business, as Ron's son Matthew took over as managing director. In September 2001, a 450-seat restaurant and an Italian-style café opened on the site. The Open Skies Glass House was introduced in 2007 with a roof that is open when the sun shines but closes when it rains, allowing customers to shop for their plants whatever the weather.

Additional funding was secured in 2014, representing the start of a 10-year development plan to transform the site into a major retail and leisure destination. As part of this expansion strategy, six new retail developments opened in 2015, including a 4,400 sq ft (410 m^{2}) Nevisport concession. The centre's largest restaurant The Fresh Approach celebrated its 15th anniversary in 2016 and became the centrepiece of an expanded dining offering: a total of six catering outlets providing over 1,200 covers with an average monthly footfall of 110,000 customers. With the number of employees rising to around 500 full and part-time staff at peak season, a new £700,000 staff facility was added to the site in January 2017. In April 2017, a dinosaur and pirate themed adventure golf course was added.
