= Holcroft Blood =

Anglo-Irish soldier and military engineer

- Born: 1660; Ireland
- Died: 19 August 1707 (aged 46–47); Brussels, Belgium

Holcroft Blood (c. 1660 – 19 August 1707) was an Anglo-Irish army officer, notable for his service as an engineer and artillery commander under the Duke of Marlborough during the War of the Spanish Succession.

== Life ==
He was the son of Thomas Blood, an adventurer who became notorious for his failed attempts to steal the crown jewels from the Tower of London and assassinate the Duke of Ormonde. His mother was Mary Holcroft, daughter of the Liverpool Mayor and MP John Holcroft.

In 1672, without his father's permission he enlisted in the Royal Navy during the Third Anglo-Dutch War, then served as a cadet in the Guards of Louis XIV of France. He returned to Ireland, and in 1676 was appointed a Justice of the Peace in County Clare. He married around this time to a widow named Elizabeth Fowler, but she later sued him for assault and adultery and they separated.

He gained further military experience serving during the Williamite War in Ireland (1689–91), fighting for the forces of William of Orange against the Jacobite Irish Army. He took part in the Siege of Carrickfergus, where he was wounded. He also participated in the Battle of the Boyne in 1690, a decisive victory for William's troops.

He was made chief of artillery during the campaigns of Marlborough. He was one of the General's inner circle of commanders including his younger brother General Charles Churchill and Chief of staff William Cadogan. He took part in the March to the Danube leading to the major victory at the Battle of Blenheim in 1704. Two years later he was present at Battle of Ramillies. He rose to the rank of Brigadier General. He died in Brussels on 19 August 1707.

== Bibliography ==
- Falkner, James. Marlborough's War Machine 1702-1711. Pen and Sword, 2014.
- Hutchinson, Robert. The Audacious Crimes of Colonel Blood: The Spy Who Stole the Crown Jewels and Became the King’s Secret Agent. Hachette, 2015.
- Manning, Roger Burrow. Swordsmen: The Martial Ethos in the Three Kingdoms. Oxford University Press, 2003.
- Watson, J.N.P. Marlborough's Shadow: The Life of the First Earl Cadogan. Leo Cooper, 2003.
