= Thomas Holcroft (politician) =

English politician (1505–1558)

Sir Thomas Holcroft
- Born: 1505; Holcroft, Culcheth, Lancashire
- Died: 31 July 1558 (c. aged 53)
- Occupations: Soldier, landowner, courtier
- Spouse: Juliane Jennings
- Children: 2, including Isabel, Countess of Rutland

Sir Thomas Holcroft (1505 – 31 July 1558) was a sixteenth-century English courtier, soldier, politician and landowner.

Holcroft's fortune was made from speculation in former monastic properties, after having distinguished himself during the Anglo-Scottish Wars. He was a close supporter of Lord Protector Somerset and represented three constituencies in the English Parliament.

== Background and early life ==
Thomas Holcroft was born at Holcroft Hall, Culcheth, Lancashire, the son of John Holcroft of Holcroft and Margaret Massey.

The Holcrofts were minor gentry who had been resident since the Middle Ages at Holcroft Hall, the remains of which lie close to the Glazebrook, to the east of Culcheth. The manor of Holcroft was the product of a division of the manor of Culcheth in the mid-13th century and the Holcrofts may have been descended from the de Culcheth family, the original holders of the manor, although the succession of the estate is not certain before John Holcroft, the lord of the manor in the early 16th century and Thomas's father. The Holcrofts had made little impression even regionally before Sir Thomas' generation. His mother's family descended from a junior branch of an ancient noble family, but were scarcely more important: Margaret was a daughter of Hamnett or Hamlet Massey of Rixton, south of Holcroft, on the River Mersey. The Masseys also had a scattering of other estates, including holdings at Pennington.

Thomas being a younger son was not first in line to inherit the Holcroft lands. His brother, John Holcroft who was about ten years his senior had children by his wife Anne Standish, but none reached adulthood; thus the Holcroft estates were entailed to Sir Thomas' family. There were also two sisters, who both married into local gentry families: Alice married Sir Thomas Hesketh whilst the elder sister, Margaret, married James Gerard of Ince, also a younger son but whose brother of Sir Gilbert Gerard became a very powerful figure in the Elizabethan legal establishment and political circles; the Gerards were important contacts for the Holcrofts.

Thomas Holcroft married Juliane Jennings. As she was the sole heiress of Nicholas Jennings, who had property at Preston, Lancashire, and in London, the marriage gave Thomas a start in making his fortune. They had a son, Thomas, and a daughter, Isabel, who married Edward Manners, 3rd Earl of Rutland.

Holcroft enlarged his fortune through a series of linked routes: serving as a soldier, exploiting contacts at court, obtaining lucrative posts in the administration, buying monastic lands, and serving as a member of parliament.

== Soldier, diplomat, courtier ==
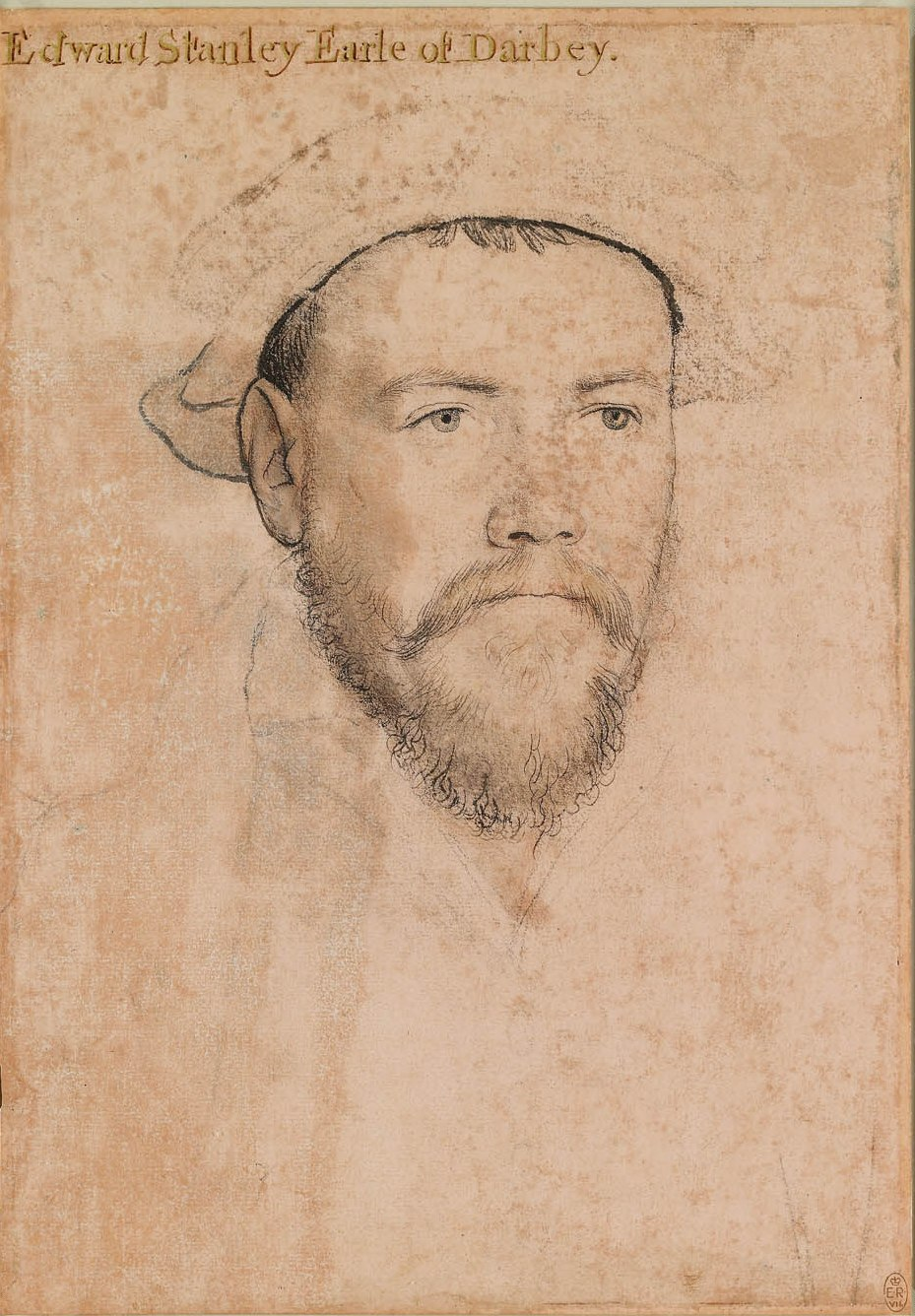
The 3rd Earl of Derby, a key figure in the politics of Lancashire, who favoured Holcroft at important points throughout his life.

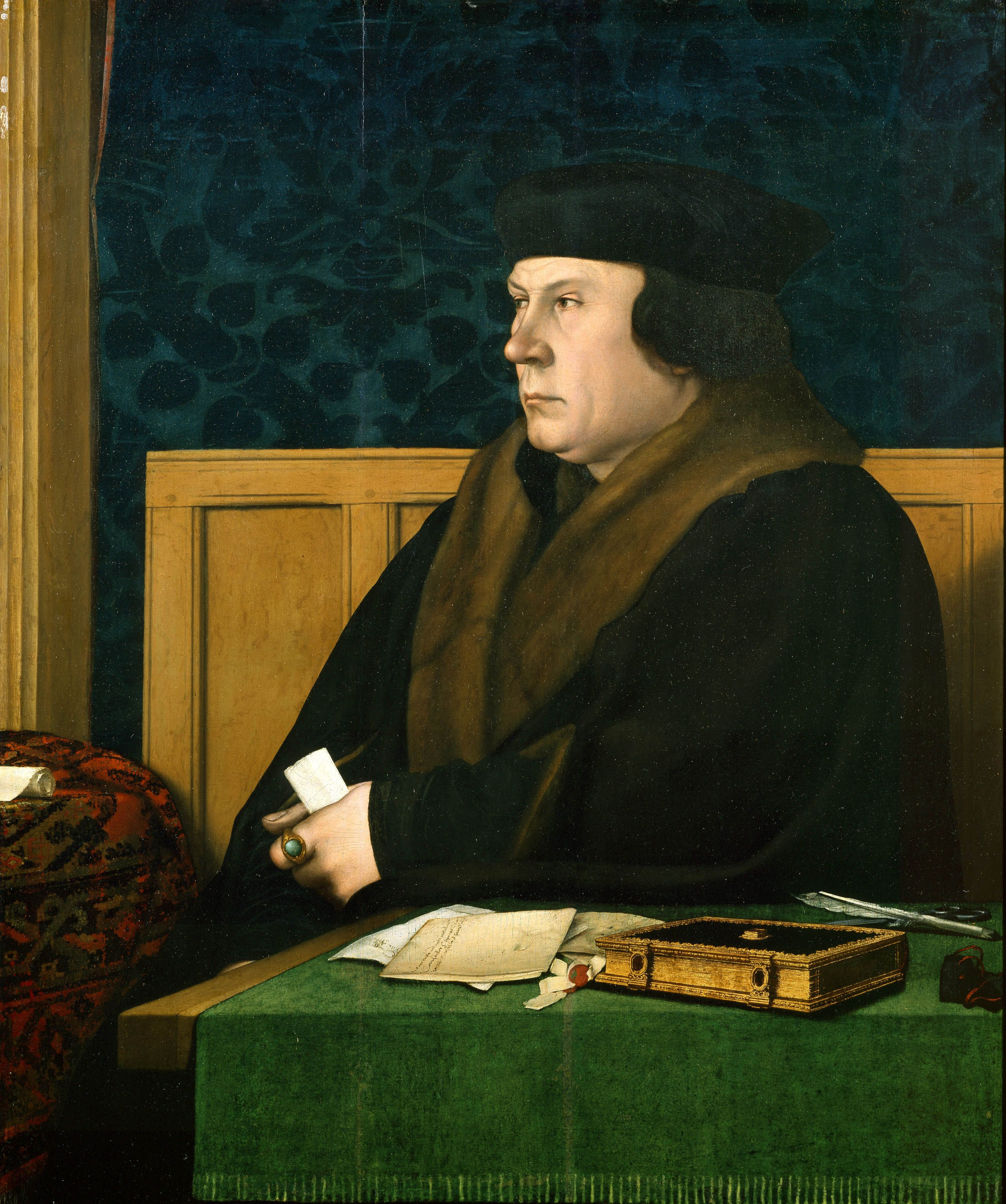
Thomas Cromwell, Henry VIII's principal secretary and chief minister, who steered through the key measures of the English Reformation. His patronage provided Holcroft's most important opportunities for enrichment.

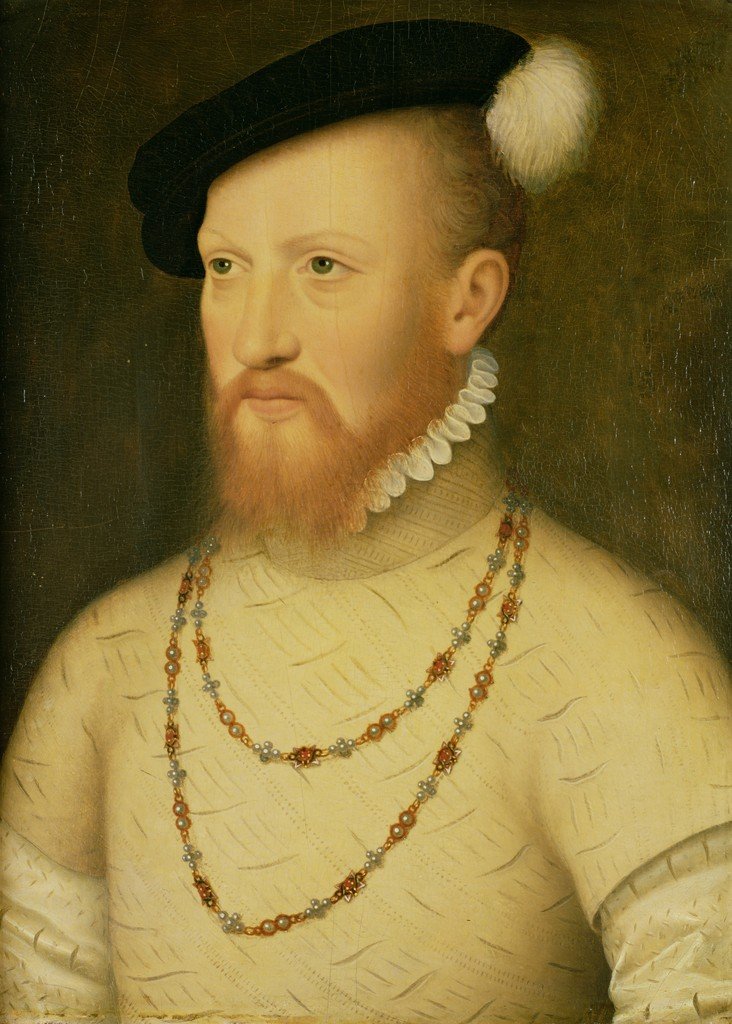
Edward Seymour, Earl of Hertford and 1st Duke of Somerset. He knighted Holcroft in 1544 and was his key patron in the reign of Edward VI.

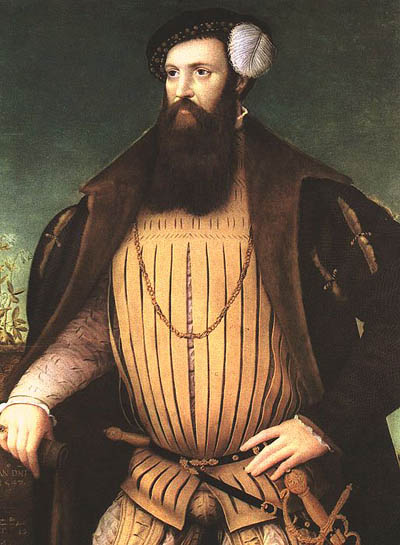
An unknown nobleman, thought to be Lord Grey de Wilton in 1547, by Gerlach Flicke, National Gallery of Scotland. Grey de Wilton commended Holcroft's conduct at the siege of Haddington.

Holcroft seems to have allied himself to Edward Stanley, 3rd Earl of Derby, the most powerful magnate in Lancashire, while still young, serving on his council. This brought him to the attention of Thomas Cromwell, and most of his later preferment stems from his able service of Henry VIII and Cromwell over the next few years. He was put on the payroll of Furness Abbey under royal mandate.

In October 1535 he was entrusted with an important mission. Holcroft and William Barlow, Prior of Bisham, were sent to James V of Scotland to pave the way for an alliance between the two countries, hitherto in conflict. The aim was to arrange a meeting between the two kings, and to explain to James, King Henry's unfolding policy of breaking with the Pope and enriching the Crown through dissolution of the monasteries. In 1536 Holcroft was sent to deliver messages to Margaret Tudor, Henry's sister and James's mother. However, this diplomatic effort was futile and the countries drifted towards war. In 1539, Holcroft was appointed to attend the Lord Admiral William FitzWilliam, 1st Earl of Southampton at the reception of Anne of Cleves.

In preparation for the expected conflict in Scotland, Holcroft was sent north with carts and horses in 1542. Responding to this provocative preparation, Scottish forces advanced in November but were severely defeated at the Battle of Solway Moss. James died shortly afterwards and attempts were made to negotiate an end to the conflict, but these failed after the return to power in Scotland of Cardinal Beaton.

War resumed in December 1543 and led to the prolonged series of campaigns known as The Rough Wooing. Norman Leslie, Master of Rothes, was the main opponent of Beaton within Scotland and was known to favour his assassination. Holcroft was sent to negotiate with Leslie. The idea was abandoned temporarily, and Holcroft served in the subsequent campaign that led to the Burning of Edinburgh. Holcroft was knighted upon the recommendation of Edward Seymour, at that time the Earl of Hertford, at Leith in May 1544.

Holcroft's service was further rewarded with positions in the Royal Household of England: in 1536 he was appointed Sewer of the Chamber and four years later Esquire of the Body. More substantial offices accompanied these: he was Bailiff for the Duchy of Lancaster in the West Derby Hundred from 1536 to 1545 and receiver for Lancashire and Cheshire for most of the period between 1538 and 1558). From 1540 to 1545 he was Master Forester for Quernmore and Wyresdale in Lonsdale Hundred. These were lucrative appointments that gave him a wide range of useful contacts.

=== Siege of Haddington ===
In the reign of Edward VI, Holcroft was given still more power and responsibility. During 1548–9 he headed the English spy network in Scotland and spent more than £400 of his own money on the work. The English commander Grey de Wilton, wrote to Edward Seymour, 1st Duke of Somerset, "rejoicing in the diligence, good will, and courage of the Lord Warden and Mr. Holcroft."

Holcroft won great distinction during the Siege of Haddington. The English garrison at Haddington held out against a Scottish and French army. Thomas Fisher, charged with arranging the return of Mary, Queen of Scots, to marry Edward VI, wrote of Haddington in a letter to William Cecil: "I assure you it had been French ere this, but for Master Holcroft, who has served as few men living would and with such liberality as is wonderful".

Edward VI heard about the exploits of Holcroft and Thomas Palmer bringing food to the besieged garrison at Haddington, and recorded their names in his journal. Holcroft's letters describe the building of a fort at Dunglass, and the "King's Pale" in Scotland, anticipating that Edward VI would receive feudal rents from the occupied area of Southern Scotland, extending from Dunglass to Berwick, and Lauder to Dryburgh. Landowners would be replaced by a Scottish "assured man" or an English landlord who would "answer the king's majesty for the rents of the same". Holcroft and Francis Leek wrote from Alnwick to Edward Seymour, now Duke of Somerset, in January 1549, about constructing further fortifications at Haddington, Lauder, and Lindisfarne.

=== Fall of Somerset ===
Holcroft became close to Somerset and chief regent of the young Edward VI, and to William Paget, Seymour's key administrator. Seymour was closely identified with the partly successful Scottish campaigns and Holcroft was given an annuity of £100 "until better provided for" when the wars ended. Seymour was toppled from power in October 1549 but later released from imprisonment and allowed to resume his place on the council. During this period Holcroft visited Paget's homes a total of nine times. The final downfall of Somerset in October 1551 brought the arrest of both Paget and Holcroft. He was imprisoned in the Tower until June 1552. He was also forced temporarily to surrender his office as receiver of the Duchy of Lancaster. However, he escaped with his head and was able to resume his activities after his release.

In Mary I's reign, Holcroft, like Paget and many other Somerset supporters, was back in favour. He was made Knight Marshal, a senior post in the household he held from 1556 until 1558. When hostilities with Scotland threatened again in Mary's reign, Holcroft was suggested as an adviser to Francis Talbot, 5th Earl of Shrewsbury, who was appointed commander in the north, as "a man of skill in matters of war". However, as he was knight marshal and had other responsibilities, the unreliable James Croft was despatched in his place.

== Parliamentary career ==
Holcroft was first elected to Parliament as knight of the shire (MP) for Lancashire in 1545. By this time he was already wealthy and had earned a knighthood through his military exploits. The Lancashire representatives were formally elected by freeholders but in reality the Duchy of Lancaster was the dominant force in the county, and the Earl of Derby had great sway as the major landowner: all MPs in the period had some sort of connection with him. Holcroft was a duchy official and had started his career as a client of Derby. As such, he was a natural choice for member of parliament. The parliament was summoned in December 1544 but did not meet for the first time until almost a year later, on 23 November 1545. It then held only two sessions before its dissolution three days after Henry VIII's death in January 1547. Among its concerns were the war with France and Scotland and the abolition of chantries. Despite his expertise in these areas, there is no record of his contributing to work in committee.

Holcroft was not returned in the parliament of 1547, the first of Edward VI's reign. His appointment as Vice-Admiral of the Coast for both Cheshire and Lancashire in that year was the work of Thomas Seymour, Protector Somerset's brother. The Seymour's were in power, and preferment from Thomas might have seemed likely to lead to greater things. However, there were tensions between the brothers that were to lead to a rupture and it seems that Holcroft had moved into the Protector's camp by the end of the year. It was not until the last year of Edward's reign, after the fall of both Seymours and during the ascendancy of John Dudley, 1st Duke of Northumberland, that Seymour was elected to parliament again, having been released from prison.

The second and last parliament of Edward VI was summoned in January 1553 and elected in a hurry, ready for assembly on 1 March. Holcroft was returned for Cheshire, the county where his interests were increasingly centred. Cheshire and Chester had not been represented in parliament until the Chester and Cheshire (Constituencies) Act 1542 gave them two seats each: the status of the palatine counties was ambiguous and transitional and they were not fully absorbed into the English political and judicial system until the 19th century. The Chamberlain of Chester was head of the palatine administration and the post was held by Sir Rhys Mansel. He apparently did not intervene in elections. Consequently, the knights of the shire were drawn from the overlapping circles of landed gentry who dominated county life. Holcroft would have needed support from within these circles, as well as the acquiescence of the Dudley regime, to emerge smoothly as MP for Cheshire. Holcroft had close links to Sir Richard Cotton, a Cheshire landowner who was Comptroller of the Household, and with Sir Thomas Venables, another local landowner and courtier, who was elected as second member for Cheshire alongside Holcroft. It is likely Cotton, who was a close supporter of Dudley, smoothed Holcroft's way with the government. Holcroft probably also used his good relationship with Cecil to communicate his loyalty.

Holcroft was able to transfer his allegiance to Mary without challenge, alongside Cotton, and like many other former Seymour supporters. Consequently, he was returned again for Cheshire in the second parliament of 1553, which was Mary's first. The parliament reversed most of the reforms of Edward VI's reign and restored the Latin Mass. He was not marked as one of those who "stood for the true religion", i.e. Protestantism, on the Crown Office list of the 1553 parliament annotated in Elizabeth I's reign.

In the next parliament, which assembled in April 1554, Holcroft represented Arundel. The constituency was tightly controlled by Henry FitzAlan, 19th Earl of Arundel, another former Seymour supporter who was now a partisan of Mary. He also controlled Steyning, which returned Holcroft's nephew Gerard for this parliament. Holcroft assisted Arundel in the negotiations that led to the marriage between Mary and Philip II of Spain. The seats for himself and Gerard were probably a token of Arundel's gratitude. The parliament lasted for only one month and Holcroft never sat in parliament again.

== Landowner and official ==
Holcroft seems to have acquired control of a wide range of small properties through his marriage, including a number of valuable business premises in London. It seems that these were used to provide funds when required. The Feet of Fines for London and Middlesex shows him and Juliana disposing of London properties during the reign of Edward VI in the parishes of St Mary-at-Hill in the Billingsgate area and that of All Hallows-by-the-Tower or "All Saints, Barkyng". A much larger group of properties in London, Essex and Bedfordshire was disposed of in the same reign to a partnership involving Gilbert Gerard, Holcroft's nephew, who was already making a name for himself as a lawyer. In the latter part of Mary's reign, Thomas and Juliana Holcroft did further property deals in London, this time involving Sir Rowland Hill, a former Protestant Lord Mayor of London, as well as Gilbert Dethick, an important Officer of arms and diplomat, and Thomas Leigh, a Protestant businessman and politician from Bedfordshire.

Holcroft made his fortune mainly by speculation in monastic lands. Initially he was appointed by Thomas Cromwell to assist the commissioners for the Dissolution of the monasteries in Lancashire. He went on to act as receiver of monastic estates. He then moved into the leasing, purchase, development and resale of lands. He spent a total of £3,798 on monastic estates. As chantries and colleges of secular canons were swept away in a later round of dissolutions, Holcroft served as commissioner for chantries in Cheshire, Lancashire and Chester in 1546, commissioner of goods of churches and fraternities for Cheshire in 1553.

He is known to have taken part in the dissolution of the following monastic houses.

Name of House	Order	Year of Dissolution	Role of Holcroft	Approximate coordinates
Cartmel Priory	Augustinian canons regular	1536	Initially lessee, with others. Purchased the priory site in 1540.	54°12′04″N 2°57′08″W
Furness Abbey	Cistercian	1537	Granted an annuity by royal mandate. Assisted commissioners and was responsible for demolition of the church.	54°08′08″N 3°11′53″W
Lenton Priory	Cluniac	1538	Receiver, jointly with his brother John Holcroft	52°56′37″N 1°10′43″W
Vale Royal Abbey	Cistercian	1538	As royal commissioner, received surrender of house. Leased the site and surrounding lands, purchasing them in 1544.	53°13′29″N 2°32′33″W
Lytham Priory	Benedictine, a daughter house of Durham Cathedral Priory	Monks withdrawn by Durham 1535, formally dissolved 1536	Acquired the priory site and lands on 23 July 1554 from Queen Mary.	53°44′39″N 2°58′37″W
Whalley Abbey	Cistercian	1537	Commissioner was John Bradyll, a servant of Thomas Holcroft. He leased the land from 1544 and purchased it jointly with Richard Assheton for £2,132 in 1554	53°49′13″N 2°24′37″W
Lancaster Friary	Dominican	1539	Purchased from the Crown 18 June 1540	54°03′03″N 2°48′22″W
Preston Friary	Franciscan	1539	Purchased from the Crown 18 June 1540	53°45′37″N 2°42′11″W
Warrington Friary	Augustinian	1539	Purchased from the Crown 18 June 1540	53°23′13″N 2°35′37″W

Holcroft acquired and has kept a reputation for ruthlessness in his acquisition of monastic lands. Robert Southwell, a key figure in the Court of Augmentations, was deputed to Lancashire during 1537, reporting of Holcroft at Furness that:

"if there is a good fee Holcroft will take it: he has been diligent, though only put in trust to pluck down the church."

Dissolution at some of the larger houses where Holcroft was involved became unusually tortuous and sometimes bloody. The Pilgrimage of Grace, essentially a Yorkshire and Lincolnshire rising, spilled over the Pennines and set off resistance in Lancashire, delaying dissolutions that were already under way. A pardon was proclaimed subsequently for religious who had taken part, and they were ordered to return to their houses for the time being, but not all were covered by this offer and some chose not to take advantage. At Cartmel some of the canons rebelled, possibly provoked by Holcroft personally, although the prior stole away to join the king's forces at Preston. Some of the rebel canons were later hanged. Rebellious feelings were not confined to the North. At Lenton, near Nottingham, the abbot and some of the monks were accused of verbal treason. They were executed and the priory dissolved under an Act of Attainder, rather than the dissolution acts. This was true also at Whalley, although Holcroft was only indirectly involved at this house, the work and profits of dissolution being undertaken by his servant John Bradyll. The monks of Furness were deeply involved in the revolt, even encouraging their tenants and servants to enlist. However, they were prudent enough to capitulate and, when faced by the example of Whalley, they all left unharmed.

Vale Royal had become riven by political dissension long before it was dissolved, and as early as 1529 an inquiry, probably under the reformer Rowland Lee, had deposed the abbot and sought to bring the abbey under stricter discipline. As dissolution became more certain, Abbot John Hareware or Harwood began to lease out the abbey lands wholesale to realise what value he could, coming into direct conflict with Thomas Cromwell, who had himself appointed steward of Vale Royal. As commissioner, Holcroft accepted surrender of the house on 7 September 1538. However, the abbot then challenged the validity of Holcroft's commission and denied that the surrender had taken place. Holcroft responded with a litany of charges of sharp practice against the abbot. He claimed Hareware had tried to get leases ante-dated and that he had tried to get sole permission to remain in the abbey. He had got personal possession of the abbey plate and numerous other items and cash, allegedly to pay off creditors. Holcroft pointed out that the abbot had run down the property disastrously by leasing demesne lands, depleting stock and felling 5000 trees. The abbot and his monks were compelled to leave in December. Holcroft initially leased the property and bought it outright in 1544. He tore down the church and built a substantial home for his family on the site. Vale Royal became the centre of his landed interests and he and his successors were styled "of Vale Royal".

Holcroft's use of his lands was enterprising, if not exploitative. He bought the three friaries as a job lot for £126 in 1540, but one of them alone fetched the same sum when he sold it three years later, minus the building stone, which he kept for himself. As lessee at Cartmel, he tripled the rents and made £250 from rents alone.

As an increasingly powerful landowner, Holcroft was a natural candidate to become High Sheriff of Lancashire in 1546. He was Custos Rotulorum of Cheshire between 1548 and 1558, a singular honour as it was the senior post in the county's civil administration.

== Later years and death ==
Although not prepared to stand up for Protestantism in parliament, there is considerable evidence that Holcroft used his position as knight marshal to aid Protestants during the Marian Counter-Reformation.

John Strype, an important 17th-century biographer of Thomas Cranmer, wrote that:

"The knight-marshal, Sir Thomas Holcroft, the under-marshal, the knight-marshal's secretary, were secret friends of the Protestants: and, when designs were laid to take any of them, some signification was often privately brought them, that search would within some few hours be made for them; and therefore that they should depart from their lodgings, and conceal themselves. And when any good men were under their hands in prison, they would take all occasions to shew them kindness, as far as safely they might."

Strype also recorded the testimony of Sir John Bourne, a principal secretary to Mary, about Edwin Sandys, the Protestant Bishop of Worcester, escape from the Marshalsea:

"That corrupt labour was made for his deliverance under queen Mary, to which he (Bourne, then secretary) assented not; and when he was discharged he knew not, but sure he was there was no plain order for it; and that he had heard, he conveyed himself away by breaking prison with the aid of sir Thomas Holcroft or his man."

Sandys continued to feud with Bourne long after Elizabeth restored Protestantism. In 1563 he made a sworn statement that Holcroft and others had sued for his release, but he did not confirm Bourne's account that Holcroft actually engineered his escape. However, Thomas Mountain, a London Protestant minister did testify that he was warned by Holcroft's secretary to leave the city. Holcroft's own religious views are not clear. His expressed attitudes and behaviour to this point suggested that he shared "the contempt with which the new gentry and officials regarded spiritual dignities". Whether anti-clerical or actually Protestant, Holcroft certainly fell foul of Mary's regime in his final months. He was replaced as knight marshal early in 1558 by Thomas Harvey, a partisan of Edward Courtenay, 1st Earl of Devon who would later defect to Philip II of Spain.

When Holcroft made his will on 25 July 1558, he was in Wenham, Suffolk, at the home of Michael Wentworth, a Yorkshire politician and courtier who seems to have been loyal to the regime. It is possible, therefore that Holcroft had been arrested and placed in Wentworth's custody. He named his wife executrix and gave her all his goods and leases. His brother, John Holcroft, and his nephew, Gilbert Gerard (albeit described as his cousin – a common usage in the 16th century), were appointed supervisors. Thomas Holcroft died on 31 July 1558.

== Marriage and family ==
Thomas Holcroft married Juliane or Juliana Jennings, the daughter and sole heiress of Nicholas Jennings, a business man and small landowner of Preston, Lancashire and London. She seems to have been much younger than him, and long survived him, dying in 1595. Both their offspring were still children when Thomas died in 1558 and he commended their upbringing to Juliana, "as she will answer to God on the day of judgment." The children were :

- Thomas Holcroft (1557–1620), who struggled financially for much of his life, as his mother had control of all the family property. Disputatious and violent, he was involved in a number of duels and died by falling down stairs. He first married Elizabeth Fitton, daughter of Edward Fitton. After her death in 1595, he married Elizabeth Rayner, widow of Henry Talbot. By Elizabeth Fitton he had a son:

- Thomas Holcroft, who married Mary Talbot, Elizabeth Rayner's daughter.

- Isabel, who married Edward Manners, 3rd Earl of Rutland. They had a daughter:

- Elizabeth Manners, who married William Cecil, 2nd Earl of Exeter, a grandson of William Cecil, 1st Baron Burghley.

== See also ==
- List of monastic houses in Lancashire
- List of monastic houses in Cheshire
