= Gilbert Gerard (judge) =

Englush lawyer, politician and landowner

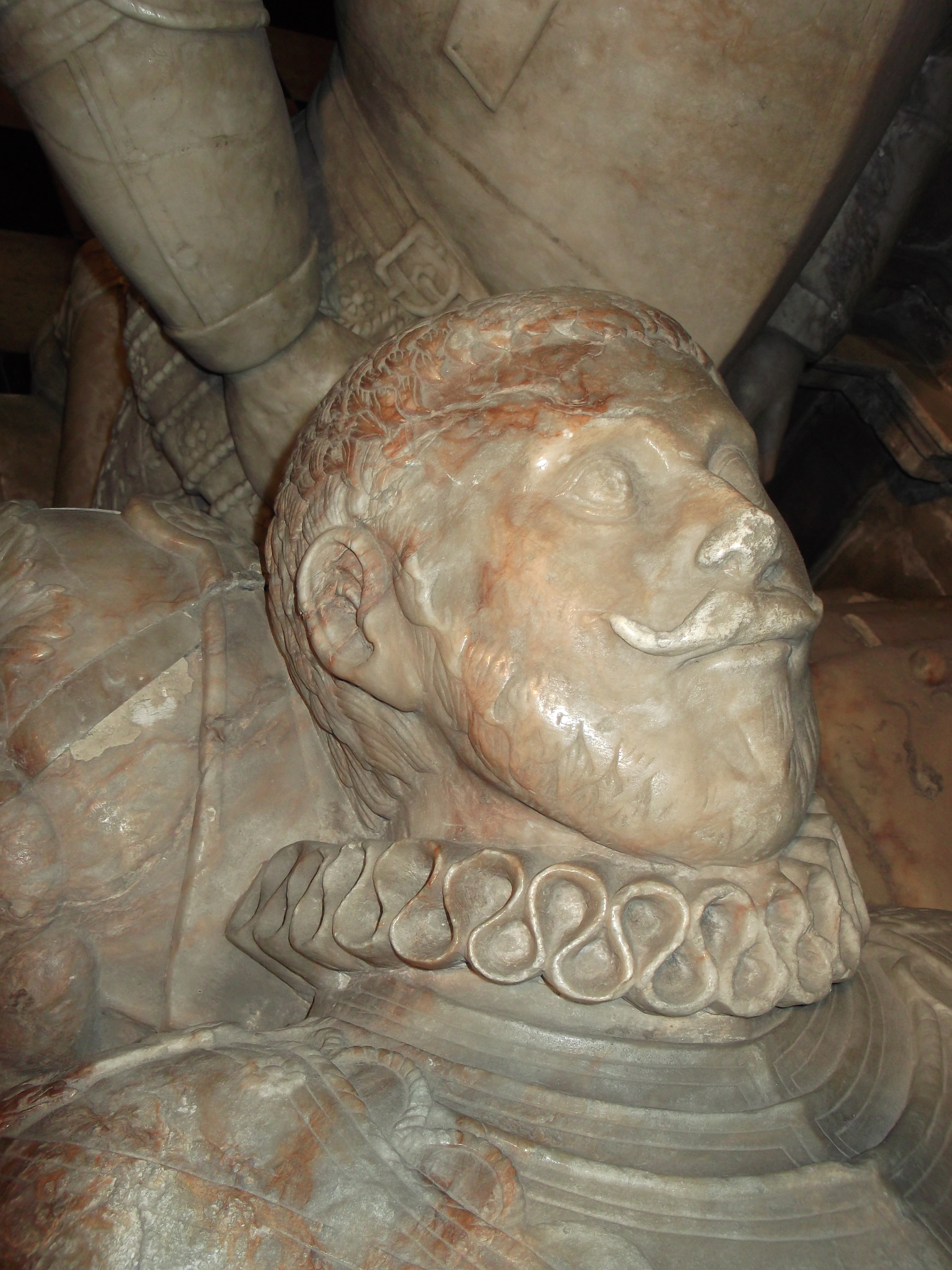
Gilbert Gerard (before 1523–1593), Attorney General 1559–81, Master of the Rolls 1581–93. Gerard Chapel, Church of St John the Baptist, Ashley, Staffordshire

Sir Gilbert Gerard (died 4 February 1593) was a prominent English lawyer, politician and landowner of the Tudor period. He was returned six times as a member of the English parliament for four different constituencies. He was Attorney General for more than twenty years during the reign of Elizabeth I, as well as vice-chancellor of the Duchy of Lancaster, and later served as Master of the Rolls. He acquired large estates, mainly in Lancashire and Staffordshire.

== Background ==
Gerard was born by 1523, the son of James Gerard of Astley and Ince, Lancashire, who was descended from the Gerards of Bryn, Ashton in Makerfield, Lancashire, and Kingsley, Cheshire. The Gerard family had lived at Ince, near Wigan, since the late 14th century. However, James was probably a younger son, so it was not expected that he or Gilbert would inherit the family estates.

The Gerard family became wealthy and distinguished in the reign of Elizabeth I, although Sir Gilbert was the most successful of them. Owing to repeated use of the same names in the Gerard family, Sir Gilbert's relatives are easily confused. Sir Gilbert was a cousin of the distinguished judge and administrator Sir William Gerard, who ended his career as Lord Chancellor of Ireland. However, he also had a younger brother, William, who served as MP for Preston and Wigan and died in 1584, and a nephew, William III, by that brother, who also served as MP for Wigan and died in 1609. Still more confusing, Sir William, the Lord Chancellor of Ireland had a son called Gilbert, who served as MP for Chester in 1593.

Gilbert's mother was Margaret Holcroft, daughter of John Holcroft of Holcroft, Lancashire. The Holcrofts were another rising landed gentry family. Margaret had two brothers: Sir John Holcroft and Sir Thomas Holcroft. Both distinguished themselves in the Anglo-Scottish Wars, served as MP for Lancashire, and profited from speculation in monastic lands at the Dissolution of the Monasteries, although it was Sir Thomas, the younger brother, who had the more successful and varied career, building up a substantial estate around the estates of the former Vale Royal Abbey. Sir John, heir to the family estates, speculated in wardships, and it was through one of these that Gilbert Gerard's marriage was arranged, to Anne Radcliffe or Ratcliffe. Sir John addressed Gerard as "cousin", a term also used for their relationship by the History of Parliament. "Cousin" was used in the 16th century more widely for blood relatives than in modern English: Sir John and Sir Thomas were Gerard's maternal uncles.

== Education ==
Gerard spent some time at the University of Cambridge but did not graduate, as was typical at the time.

He entered Gray's Inn in 1537, when he was probably still about 16, and was called to the bar in 1539. He seems to have been an outstanding student and was honoured by the Inn several times in later life. In 1554 he was elected Autumn Reader, an important post with both academic and administrative responsibilities, and in 1556 he served as Treasurer.

Allegiance to Gray's Inn became a family tradition and it served as a power base for the family. Gerard installed himself in a room there and was generally styled "of Gray's Inn". His nephew William later moved into the room too and added an office above it for his own use, and Thomas Holcroft, Sir Thomas's son, was also admitted to Gray's Inn in 1588.

== Parliamentary career ==
Gerard's parliamentary career was interwoven with his progress as a lawyer. He was returned to parliament a total of six times, four of them in the reign of Mary I.

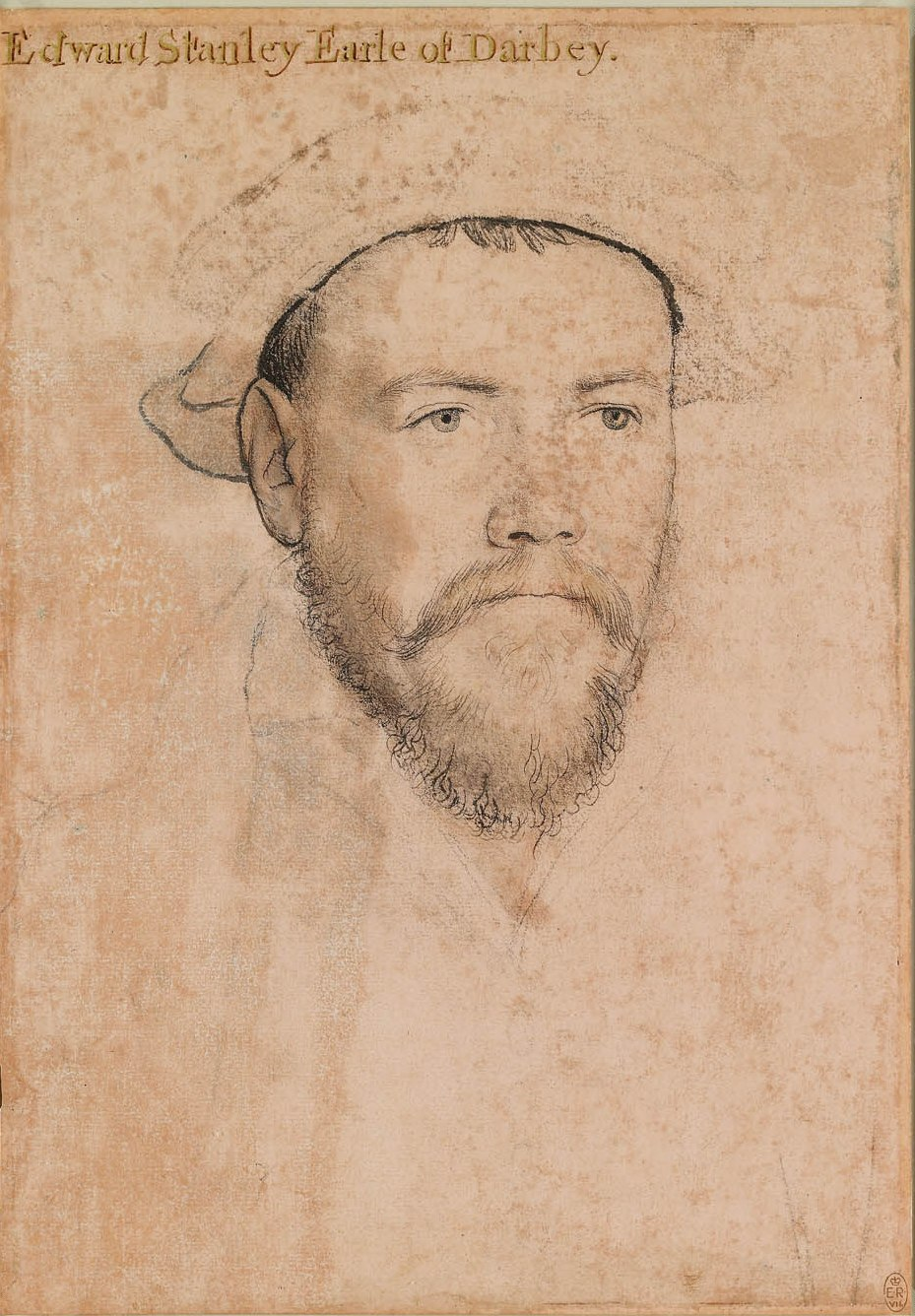
The 3rd Earl of Derby, a key early patron of Gerard.

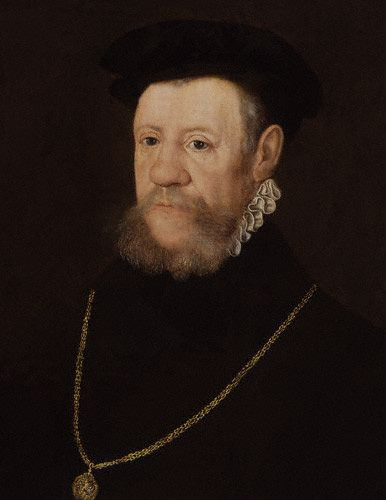
Henry FitzAlan, 19th Earl of Arundel, another of Gerard's political patrons.

Gerard was first returned as MP in 1545 for Liverpool. The town belonged to the Duchy of Lancaster, and the most important local magnates were the Earls of Derby and the Molyneux family. 1545 may have been the first year Liverpool had returned members for about a century - certainly the first for which records survive.

By the early years of Elizabeth's reign, the Earls of Derby and the Duchy of Lancashire were effectively selecting one member each, although it was the mayor and burgesses or freemen who nominally elected the members. Even in 1545, it is likely that Edward Stanley, 3rd Earl of Derby was a decisive influence in handing a seat to Gerard. The two probably already knew each other: Gerard was the earl's legal counsel by 1562 - perhaps much earlier.

Another influential supporter would have been Gerard's uncle, Sir Thomas Holcroft, who was an official of the Duchy of Lancaster and held the Liverpool fee-farm of the Duchy: he was returned as MP for Lancashire in the same parliament.

Gerard was returned as junior to the other member, Nicholas Cutler, a client of Charles Brandon, 1st Duke of Suffolk. The influence of the Molyneux family grew subsequently and Sir William Molyneux and his son acquired joint control of the Liverpool fee-farm later in 1545, often coming into confrontation with Derby and the civic officials. This may have played a part in Gerard's move to a safer seat in later elections.

Gerard was elected as MP for Wigan in March and October 1553: the last parliament of Edward VI and the first of Mary's reign. The lord of the manor of Wigan was the rector, and members of the Gerard family had purchased the advowson, making them extremely influential in local government, which was divided between the rector and the civic officials of the borough.

As Wigan was part of the Duchy and the County palatine of Lancaster, duchy officials had considerable influence. The Earl of Derby was also an important figure locally. The senior MP in 1547 and for the next five elections was Alexander Barlow, a member of the Earl's council and soon to be his brother-in-law. All this favoured Gerard, although it is likely his own relatives were his most decisive allies: the High Sheriff of Lancashire, the returning officer, in 1553 was Sir Thomas Gerard, a cousin.

In April 1554, Gerard was returned as MP for Steyning, Sussex. Steyning had belonged to Syon Abbey until the Dissolution of the monasteries but now formed part of the royal honour of Petworth. As steward of the honour, the decisive voice in selecting the members belonged to Henry FitzAlan, 19th Earl of Arundel, a religious conservative who had supported the Somerset faction under Edward VI and was now a key supporter of Queen Mary and Lord Steward of her household. Significantly, he was happy to support Gerard. Sir Thomas Holcroft, Gerard's uncle was returned for the neighbouring constituency of Arundel, where almost all the members in the 16th century were nominated by the earls.

However, for the 1555 election Gerard returned to Wigan, again being returned as junior to Barlow. Gerard seems to have done little as a member of parliament. His name does not appear in the records, even though, as a rising lawyer, he would have been useful in drafting and reviewing bills. It is clear, however, that he broadly supported Mary's regime. If he had not, his name would appear on either the list of those who "stood for the true religion" in 1553–4, or among those who supported Sir Anthony Kingston in the 1555 parliament, or on the list of government opponents kept by William More.

Despite his reputation as a staunch Protestant supporter of Elizabeth, Gerard appears in fact to have been essentially conservative, accepting the existing regime irrespective of religious policy. Elizabeth probably promoted him because of his proven competence as an advocate, not his ideological purity.

Only once more did Gerard secure election to parliament, and that much later in life. On 18 November 1584 he was returned as member for Lancashire. As the county seats were dominated by the Duchy of Lancaster and the Earls of Derby, Gerard would have had a good chance in Lancashire at any time. However, he was by now vice-chancellor of the Duchy, so the result was not in question. He was returned as senior knight of the shire, together with Richard Molyneux. As he was already Master of the Rolls, he was required to attend the House of Lords, although not a peer.

Consequently, he was unable to sit in the House of Commons. In January of the following year he was replaced as MP by Richard Bold, a powerful local landowner whose wife was a known recusant and who had recently been reported to Burghley as a recusant himself.

== Legal career ==
=== Barrister ===
Information about Gerard's career before the accession of Elizabeth I is scanty and not always reliable. He was made an Ancient - a barrister qualified to practise independently - in 1547. The first mention of him as an advocate is in Edmund Plowden's Commentaries, relating to Michaelmas term 1554. According to a tradition found in William Dugdale's Baronage of England, Gerard represented Elizabeth when she was examined by the Privy Council:

"In the time of Queen Mary (as by credible tradition I have heard) upon the Lady Elizabeth's being questioned at the Council table, he was permitted to plead there on her behalf and performed his part so well that he suffered for the same in the Tower of London during the remaining term of Queen Mary's reign."

However, this is certainly not entirely true. Gerard cannot have spent much, if any time in prison, as he was appointed permanent counsel by the City of London in October 1554, and represented Wigan in the English parliament for the third time in 1555. Nor can he have incurred the wrath of Mary, as he was made a Serjeant-at-law, one of a small and extremely powerful group of barristers with exclusive rights to work in the Court of Common Pleas towards the end of her reign - an appointment that lapsed on her death. He was made Justice of the Peace in five counties by 1559, many of them probably in Mary's reign: Bedfordshire, Buckinghamshire, Cambridgeshire, Cheshire and Huntingdonshire. However, it is certainly true that Gerard was much favoured by Elizabeth and one of a small group of lawyers who were quickly installed in important offices to consolidate the new regime.

=== Attorney-General ===
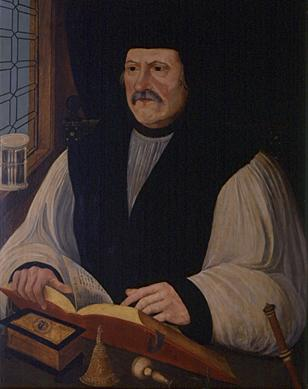
Matthew Parker, Archbishop of Canterbury 1559–75.

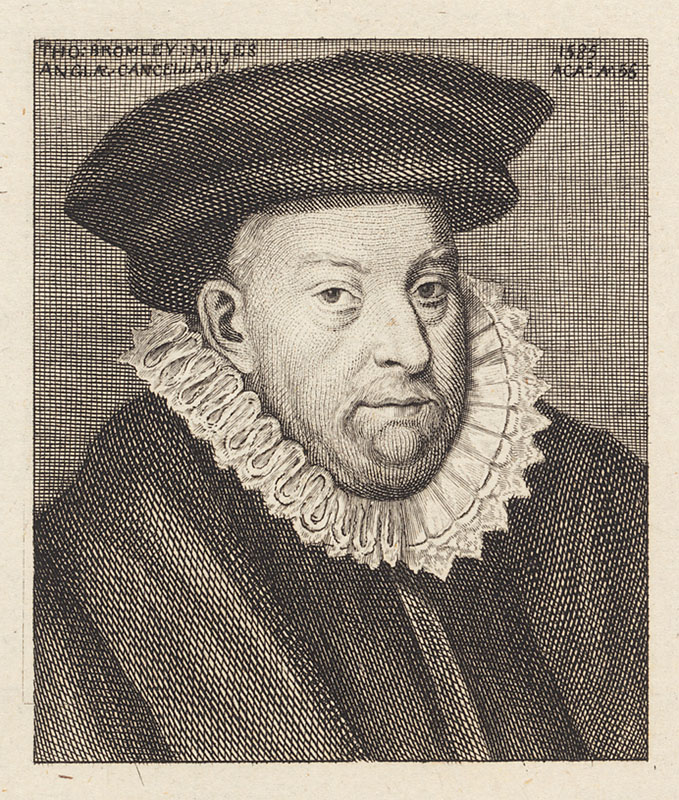
Thomas Bromley, Solicitor General 1569–79, Lord Chancellor 1579–87.

Gerard was made Attorney General on 22 January 1559, a week after Elizabeth's coronation, still a young man for such a senior legal post. He was early deputed to Ireland, where he helped reform the procedure of the Court of Exchequer and drew up new rules for collecting the Queen's rent. He sat as a judge on trials including that of John Hales in 1564.

Much of his work was ecclesiastical and he was appointed to the Ecclesiastical Commission by 1564. In 1567 he helped Matthew Parker, the Archbishop of Canterbury, in reforming Merton College, Oxford. From 1561 he represented the University of Cambridge whenever he was not engaged as a justice, and in 1571 he was thanked by the University for his work in securing the passage of an Act of Parliament confirming its charters and privileges.

Gerard was appointed to key positions in the administration or judiciary all over the country. He was made Justice of the Peace in Norfolk and Suffolk, and later in Lancashire. In 1573 he was appointed Custos Rotulorum of Middlesex, the county's senior administrative official.

Gerard was actively involved in defending Elizabeth against plots and revolts. In 1570, he was a member of a commission trying participants in the Rising of the North of the previous year, sitting mainly at York and Durham. In 1571 he assisted in the interrogation and prosecution of participants in the Ridolfi plot. He devised the questions put to the Duke of Norfolk, John Lesley, the Earl of Northumberland, Lord Lumley and others. In the following year he seconded Nicholas Barham in the prosecutions of Norfolk and his secretary, Robert Higford: the only two State Trials of his term of office.

With Thomas Bromley, the Solicitor General from 1569, Gerard had to settle many problems of jurisdiction. One of the most important concerned an attempt in 1576 by Worcester and Worcestershire to shake off the authority of the Council of Wales and the Marches - a bid which Gerard and Bromley turned down. Gerard must have been disappointed that it was Bromley, about a decade younger than himself, who was appointed Lord Chancellor and Lord Keeper of the Great Seal in 1579, although he was rewarded with a knighthood in that year.

However, the post of Attorney General was lucrative. It allowed Gerard to acquire wardships, leases and a grant of wine free of duty, and he exercised considerable patronage. Most importantly, it gave him access to a source of wealth and power through the Duchy of Lancaster, which dominated the north-west of England and had been united with the Crown since 1399. The duchy had considerable holdings outside its natural area of influence, and Gerard began by acquiring in 1567 the stewardship of Copt Hall in the honour of Clare, Suffolk, which had been transferred to the duchy by Queen Mary. In the same year he became steward of Rochdale manor, and over the decades increased his stewardships in Clare and became bailiff of the Lancashire hundreds of West Derby and Amounderness. In 1571 he became vice-chancellor of the duchy. Along with the Chancellor, Ralph Sadler, this gave him great political influence. Gerard and Sadler both used their positions to have their sons returned as MPs for Lancaster.

=== Master of the Rolls ===
Gerard was promoted in 1581 to be Master of the Rolls, the chief administrative post in the Court of Chancery and second most senior judge in the land. If the honour was not so great as the Chancellorship, the financial rewards were a great compensation. For example, in 1586, Gerard drew an income of £1,599 5s.3d. from his post, mainly from fines, writs and legal instruments. The posts of the clerks of the petty bag, the examiners and the clerks of the rolls chapel, usher, crier and doorkeeper, his three secretaries and numerous minor posts all fell within his patronage, so he was able to make considerable extra profits from the sale of offices.

As Master of the Rolls, Gerard was still frequently involved in trials. He sat in the case of William Davison, who was the scapegoat for the execution of Mary, Queen of Scots. Davison was standing in for Francis Walsingham as principal secretary to Elizabeth when the warrant for Mary's execution was signed. Elizabeth then decided to have Mary executed secretly, but while she was wavering, Davison was present at a Privy Council meeting in Burghley's rooms when it was decided to send the warrant to Fotheringhay Castle.

Subsequently, Davison alone had to face Elizabeth's wrath. He was sent to the Star Chamber for trial, where Gerard and his fellow judges sentenced him to a fine of 10,000 marks and imprisonment during the Queen's pleasure. In fact, his fine was remitted and he was released after a few months, even receiving his salary while detained. However, the case is regarded as notorious by legal historians and did not reflect well on the judges involved.

While a distinguished judge, Gerard seems to have been a poor administrator. His departments became increasingly chaotic and slipshod in their work. Bromley died in 1587 and was succeeded by the still younger Christopher Hatton, who survived only until 1591. At this point the Queen and her advisors decided to reorganise the legal departments. The issue of instruments was separated off and placed under the authority of a commission of Privy Councillors. Gerard and the other judges were formed into a second commission to hear cases. The commissions then began to dispute the boundaries of their jurisdiction, while Gerard's commission fell into internal dissension, with other judges refusing to accept his authority. The problems were compounded by his descent into illness, which led to his death on 4 February 1593.

== Landowner ==
Although not heir to any of the major groups of Gerard family estates, Sir Gilbert was able to build up a large patrimony of his own. He did this mainly by seizing opportunities that came his way through his professional life or family contacts. Through his wife he acquired the Damhouse at Astley. He also had estates in Middlesex, Shropshire and Wiltshire.

Another major purchase was within the family. His cousin, Sir Thomas Gerard of Bryn, was a Catholic and father of the famous Jesuit priest John Gerard. He acquired considerable estates in Derbyshire and Staffordshire, including Etwall through marriage to Elizabeth, daughter of John Port (the younger). He was implicated in a plot to free Mary, Queen of Scots, from Tutbury Castle, close to Etwall. Imprisonment and fines forced him to dispose of some property and he sold to Gilbert Gerard lands around Ashley, Staffordshire. Gilbert built there a very large house, Gerrard's Bromley, which became the seat of his branch of the Gerards.

== Marriage and family ==
Gerard married Ann Radcliffe or Ratcliffe. She was the daughter of Thomas Ratcliffe of Winmarleigh and of Isabel Boteler. As her father died before she reached the age of majority, she became a ward of Sir Thomas Holcroft, Gerard's uncle. She inherited Damhouse in Astley, which was later sold by her son, Thomas. She remained a Catholic throughout her life.

They had two sons:

- Thomas, Gilbert's heir, was created the first Baron Gerard of Gerrard's Bromley in 1603.

- Ratcliffe married Elizabeth Somerset, a wealthy heiress related to the Earls of Worcester. (Note: Elizabeth was daughter of Sir Charles Somerset K.B. fifth son, of Henry, Earl of Worcester.) They had a number of children.

- Sir Charles Gerard of Halsall, married Penelope, sister and coheir of Sir Edward Fitton, 2nd and last of the Fitton baronets of Gawsworth, Cheshire. They had at least three sons:

- Charles (the eldest), a Cavalier general during the Civil War and a courtier after the Restoration. He was made Baron Gerard of Brandon in 1645 and Earl of Macclesfield in 1679.
- Edward Gerard, a colonel of foot who was wounded at the First Battle of Newbury (1643).
- Sir Gilbert Gerard, killed in one of the frequent skirmishes that took place in Ludlow between Cavaliers and Roundheads.

- Gilbert, a colonel of a Royalist regiment of foot and was appointed Governor of Worcester in December 1642.
- Ratcliffe, twin brother of Gilbert, under whom he served as a lieutenant-colonel. He married Jennet, the illegitimate daughter of Devereux Barrett of Tenby, Pembrokeshire. They had several children:

- Gilbert (died 1687), served as a Royalist captain in the Civil War, after the restoration sat as MP for Northallerton and was made Baronet of Fiskerton
- John (1632–1654) served as an ensign in the Civil War, was executed in for his part in the Gerard's conspiracy
- Charles (born 1635)

They also had at least four daughters who survived infancy:

- Frances married Richard Molyneux of Croxteth and Sefton, an important Lancashire landowner, who became first of the Molyneux baronets. One of their sons was

- Richard Molyneux, 1st Viscount Molyneux

- Radclyffe married Sir Thomas Wingfield of Letheringham.

- Catherine married Richard Hoghton, a Lancashire landowner who became first of the De Hoghton baronets.

- Margaret married Peter Legh of Lyme Park, Cheshire, a client of the Earls of Derby who studied at Gray's Inn, probably under the auspices of Gilbert Gerard.

== Death and burial ==
Gerard's will was made on 8 January 1593 and probate was on 6 April of that year. He died on 4 February 1593, and was buried at Ashley, Staffordshire, on 6 March. The legal historian Edward Foss points out that William Dugdale reported the year of his death as 1592, and this has been repeated in some accounts. In February 1592 (New Style) Gerard was still working, and around that time was put in charge of the new commission to hear cases in Chancery. The confusion was probably the result of the difference between Old Style and New Style dates. The known details are unusually exact, as the parish register recorded the date of death, not just the burial, as was customary.

In his later years, Gerard had come under suspicion for his religious beliefs. An anonymous letter of 1586 to Walsingham denounced him as "a protestant at London and a papist in Lancashire ... there is no man that so much shifteth papists from the danger of the law as he doth". His wife and two of his daughters, at least, were known Catholics. Many of his descendants, like Richard Gerard of Hilderstone who died in Newgate Prison in 1680, were staunchly Catholic. However, this seems not to be true of his heir, Thomas, who gave specific directions to be buried without ceremony - a provision typical of radical Protestants. In the preamble to his will, Gerard himself expressed his trust in Divine grace, as "there is nothing in any of my works or deeds whereby I can or may challenge or attain unto everlasting life". These words closely echo the Protestant teaching embodied in Article 11 of the Thirty-Nine Articles: "We are accounted righteous before God, only for the merit of our Lord and Saviour Jesus Christ by faith, and not for our own works or deservings." He left plate to his sons-in-law Sir Richard Molyneux, Peter Legh and Richard Hoghton, and to an unmarried daughter, presumably Radclyffe, who was also promised £1,000 towards her wedding. His wife received all her jewels and household equipment, as well as use of his Middlesex house.

The Gerard family memorial in Ashley parish church

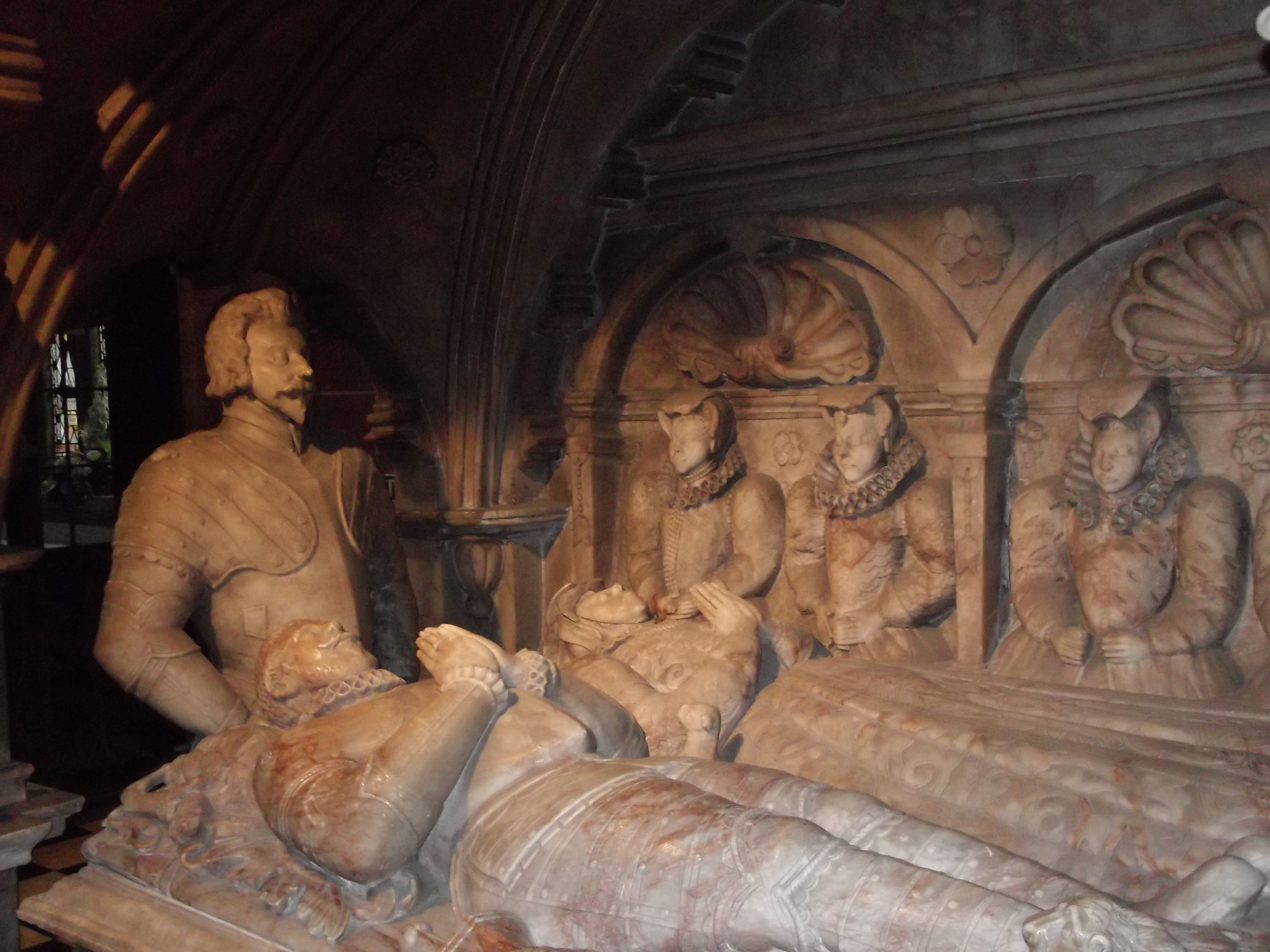
The Gerard family: Thomas, 1st Baron Gerard (kneeling); Gilbert Gerard, Attorney General 1559–81; Anne Radcliffe. Gerard Chapel, Church of St John the Baptist, Ashley, Staffordshire.

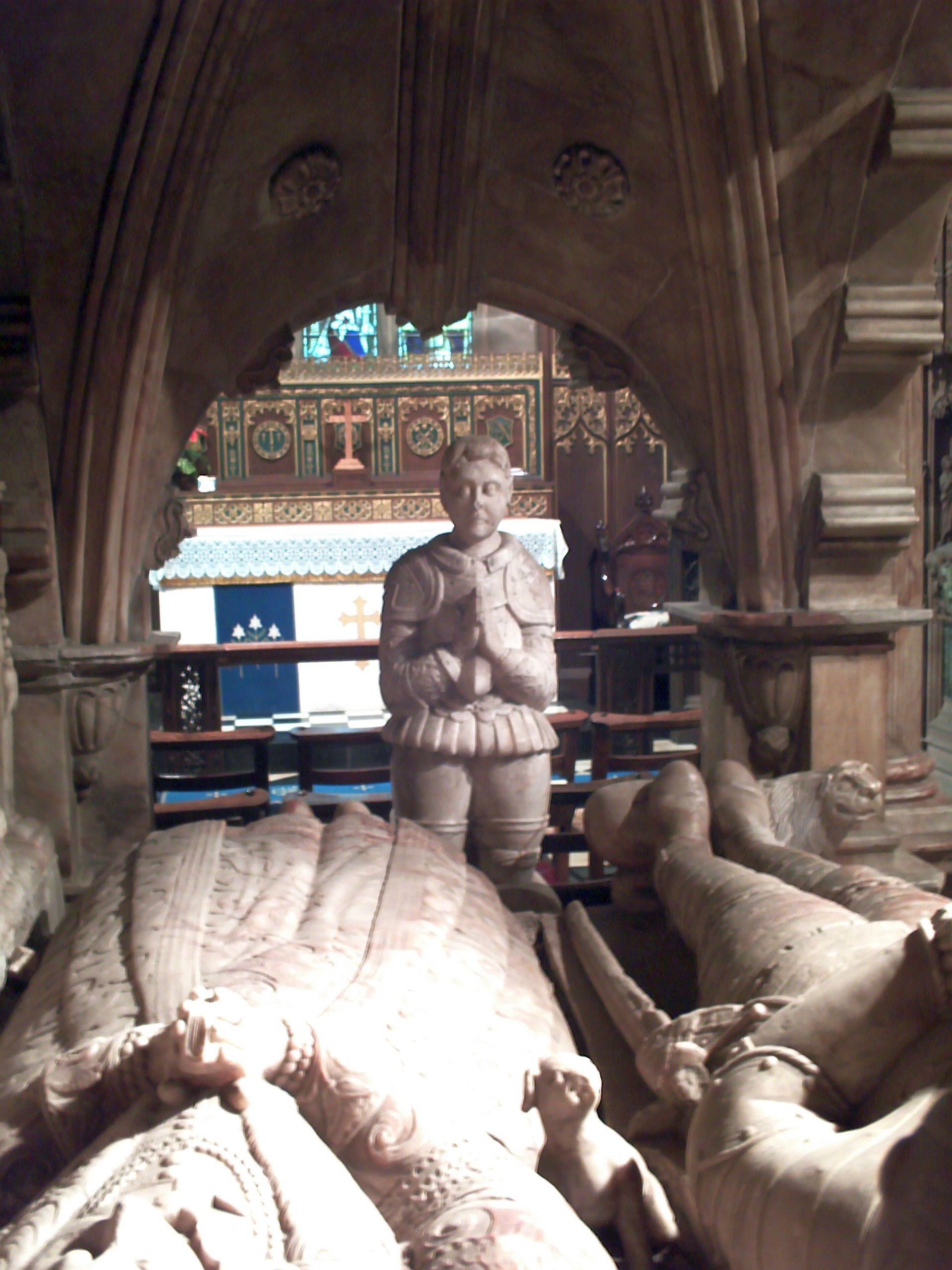
The Gerard family. Sir Gilbert Gerard and his wife, Anne Radcliffe, in foreground. Gilbert Gerard, 2nd Baron Gerard, facing.

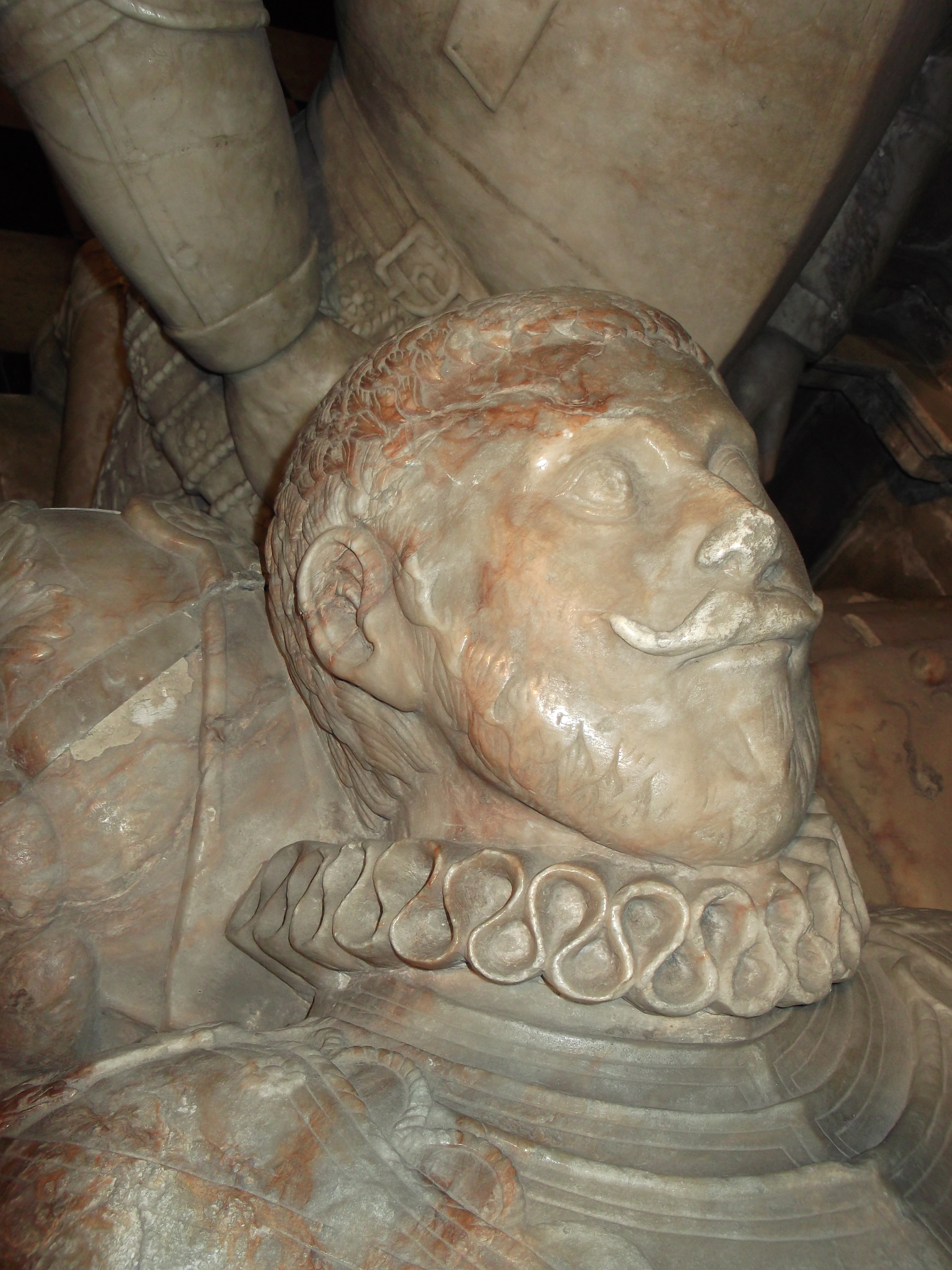
Sir Gilbert Gerard (before 1523–1593), Attorney General 1559–81, Master of the Rolls 1581–93.

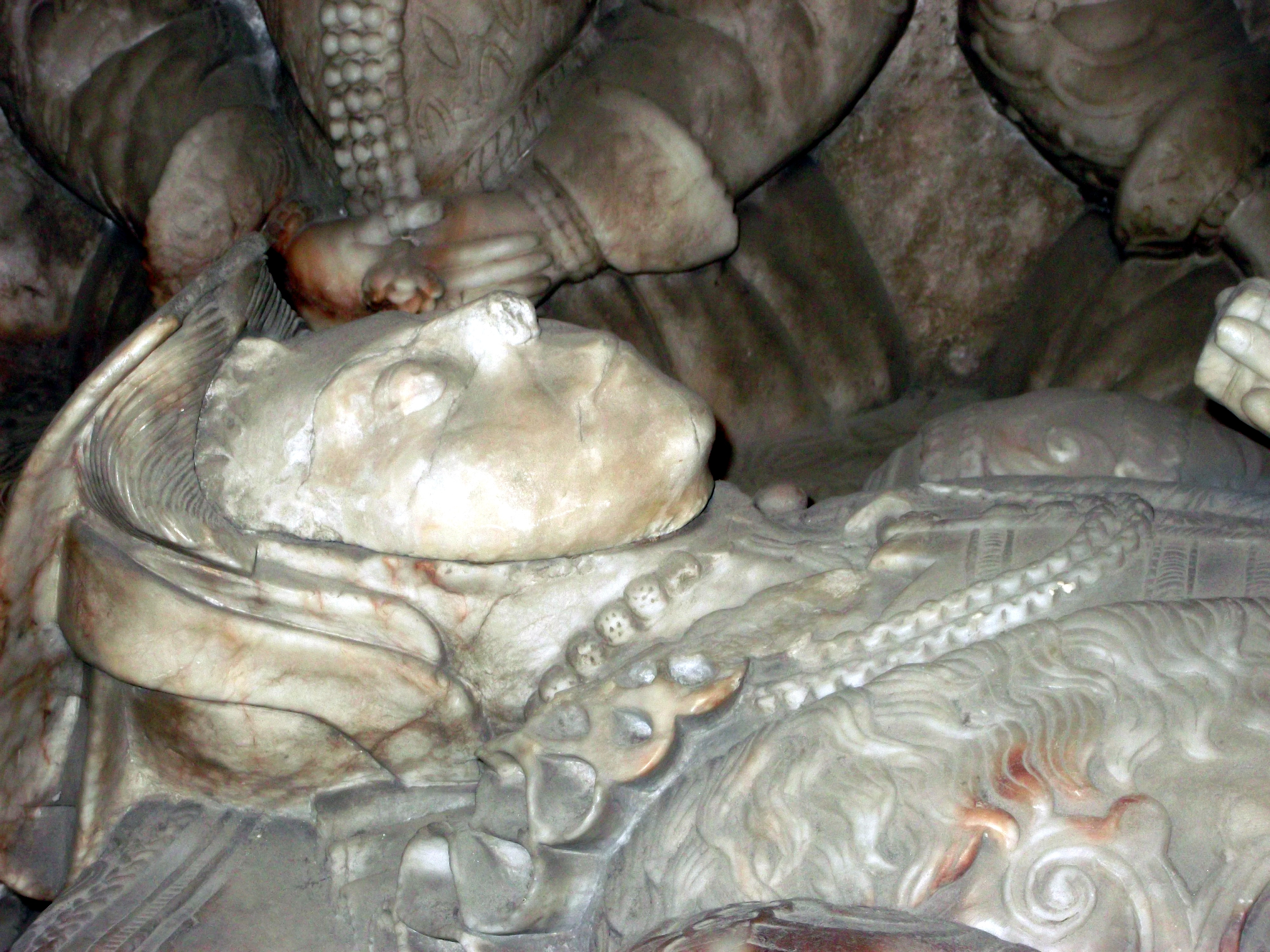
Anne Radcliffe of Winmarleigh, Lancashire, wife of Gilbert Gerard and mother of Thomas.

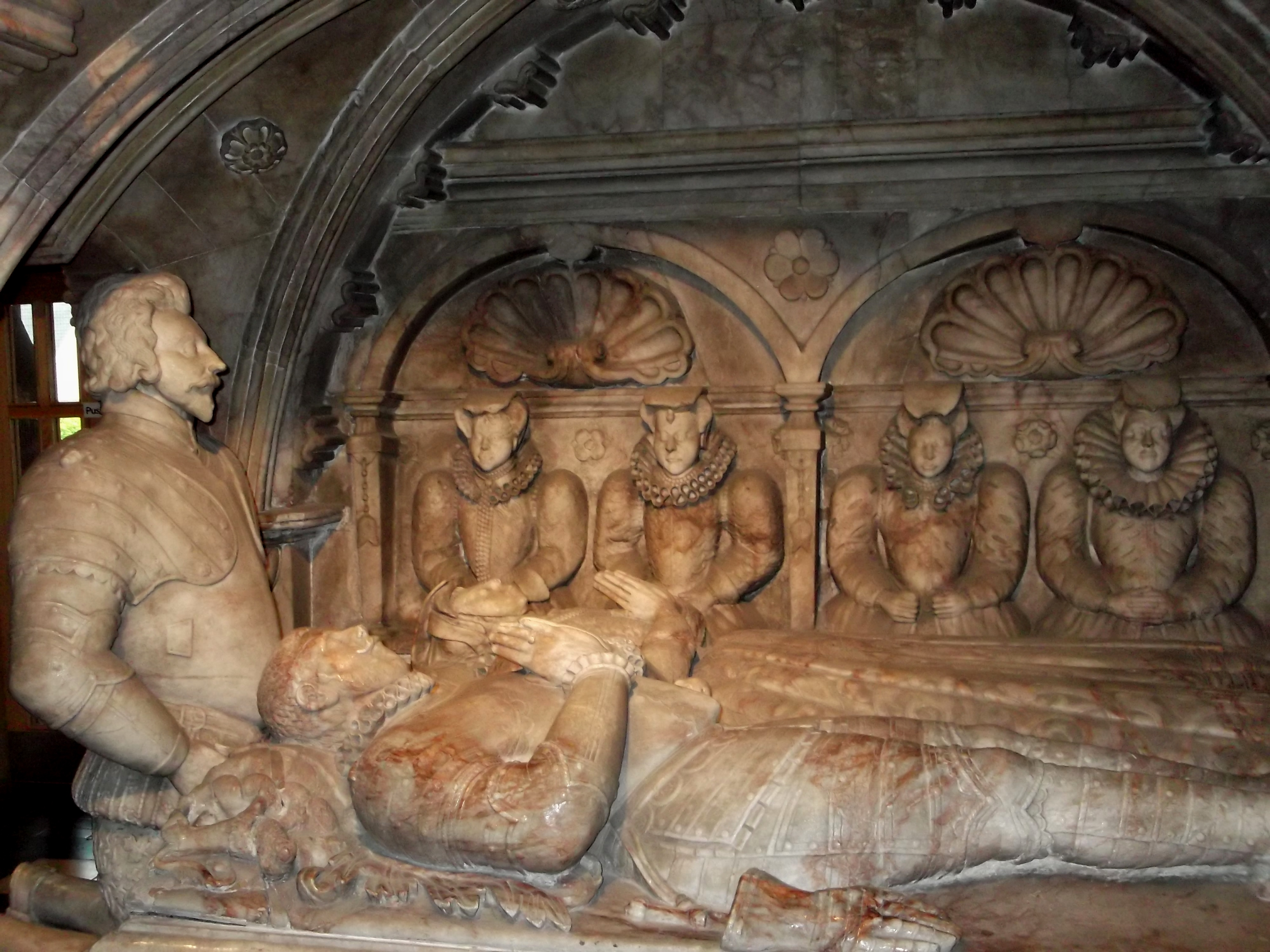
Gerard family memorial, clearly showing Sir Gilbert and Anne's four daughters on rear panel: Frances, Radclyffe, Catherine, Margaret.

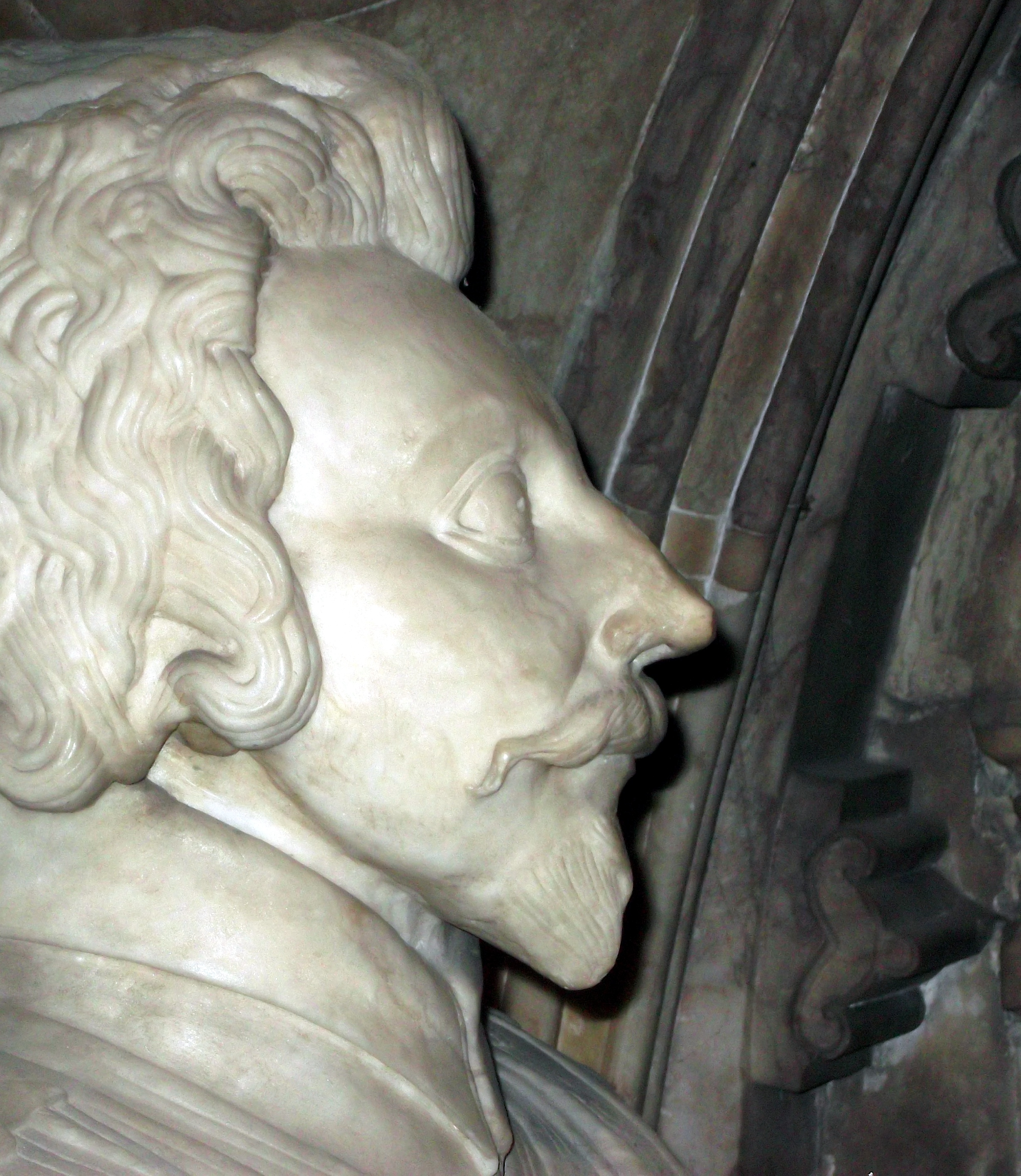
Thomas Gerard, 1st Baron Gerard (c.1554-1618), eldest son and heir of Sir Gilbert.

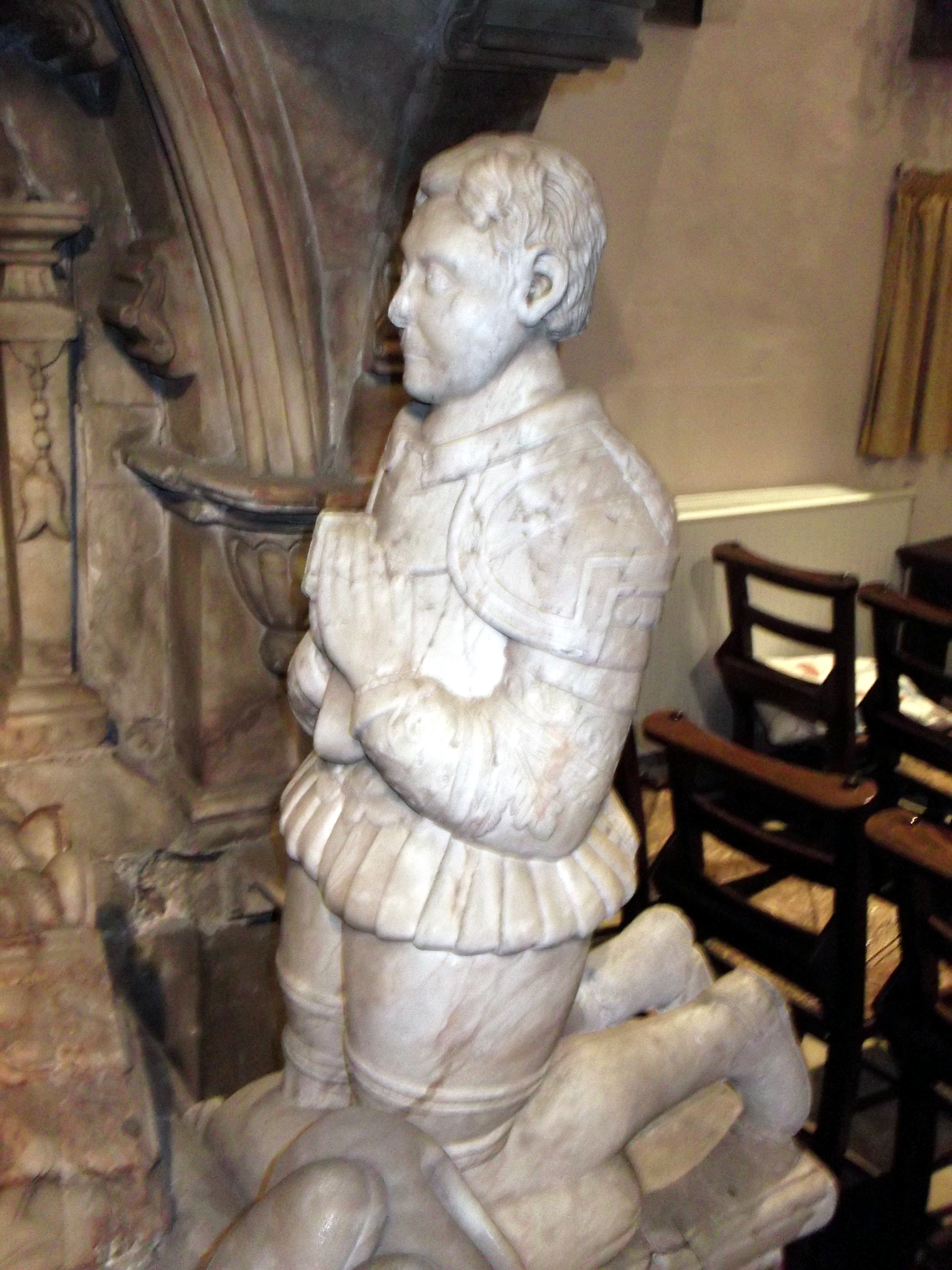
Gilbert, 2nd Baron Gerard (d.1622).

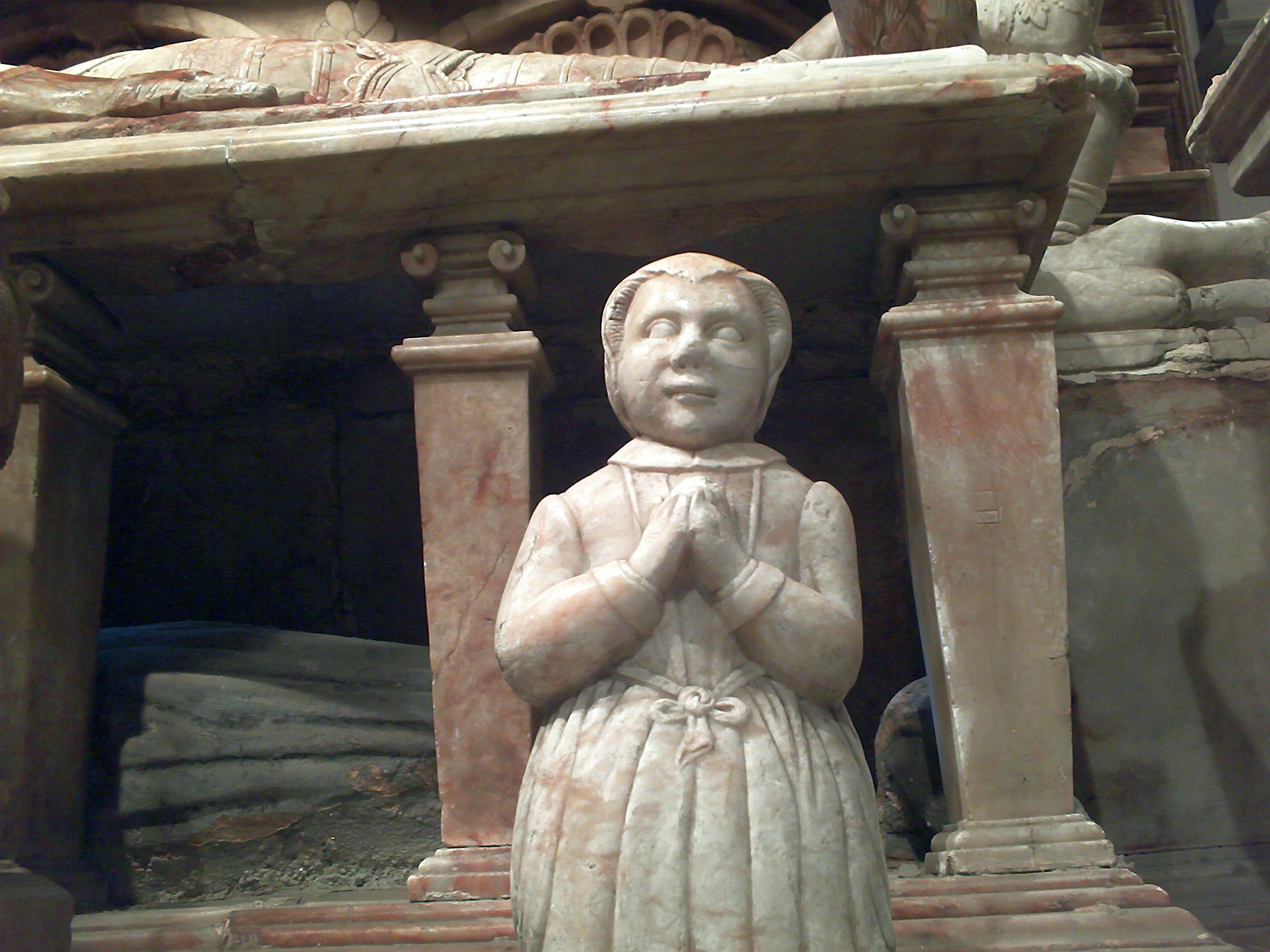
Kneeling figure at front of Gerard family memorial, perhaps representing a daughter who predeceased her parents.

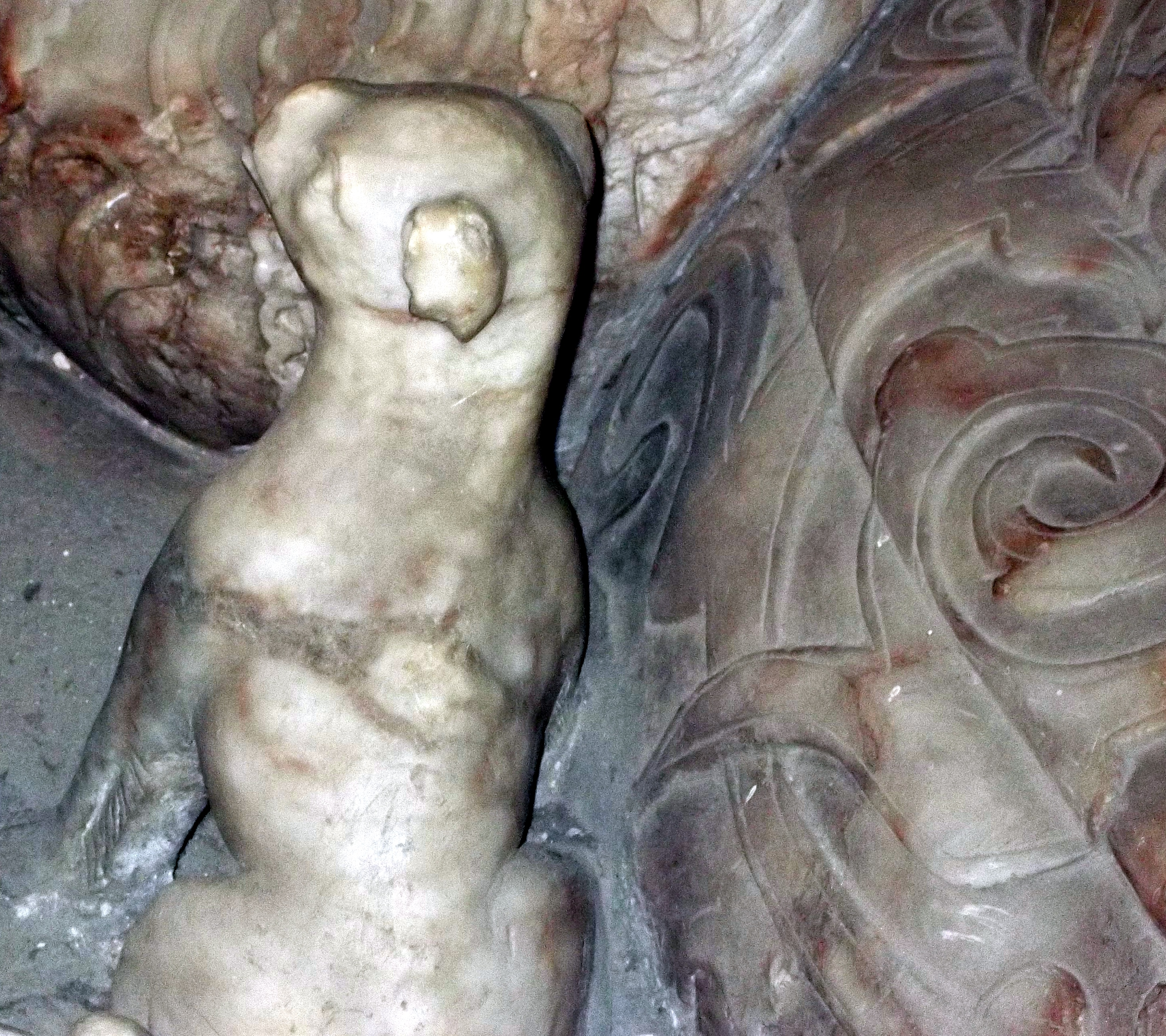
Anne Radcliffe's Talbot dog.

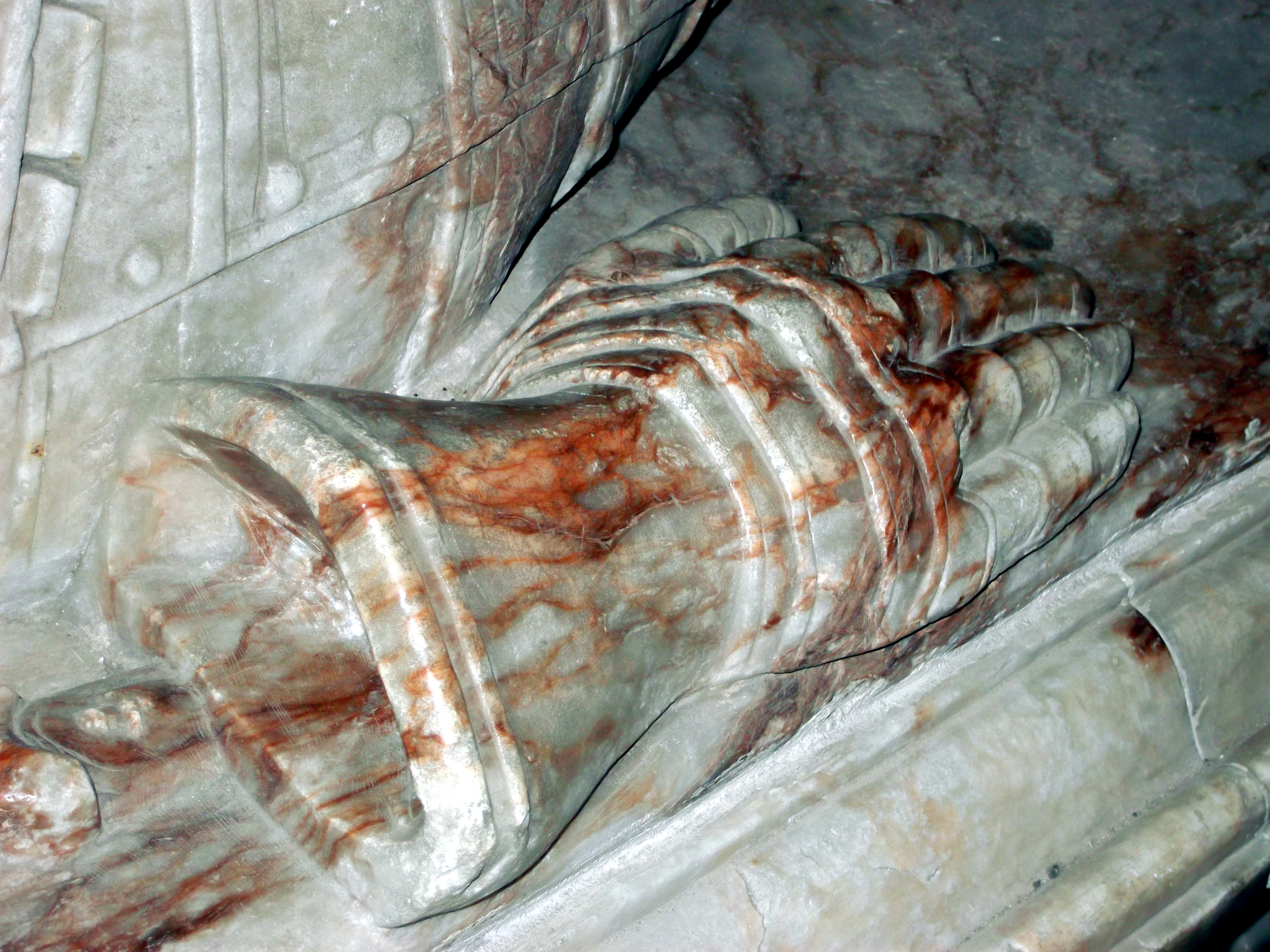
Gauntlet, part of Gilbert Gerard's armour.

Gerard was commemorated by an elaborate memorial in Ashley parish church, which grew and was modified over several generations. The main structure, built under the supervision of Gilbert's son, Thomas, portrays him and Anne, lying in splendour. She has her Talbot dog at her side, while he is in full armour, an uncharacteristic garb for him, with a finely modelled gauntlet at his side. Beneath the Gerards is a cadaver, but, unlike the case of a normal cadaver tomb, it appears to date from an earlier period. The kneeling figure of Thomas Gerard looms over his parents at the head end, vigilant but not in prayer. A smaller kneeling and praying figure, said to be the younger son Ratcliffe, is placed at the feet of the couple. Both kneeling figures are completely free-standing and detached from the main structure, clearly added later and at the sacrifice of part of its moulded edge. The four daughters of Gilbert and Anne, all of whom survived their parents, are portrayed on a separate rear panel. Two more smaller kneeling and praying female figures, free-standing and detached, are placed to the front of the main structure - possibly daughters who predeceased their parents, but more likely of a later generation. The monument is surmounted by a vast, densely decorated alabaster canopy, displaying the armorial bearings of the Gerards and Radcliffes.

The work was claimed by John Betjeman as the largest Elizabethan monument in England, and said to be executed "under the influence" of Joseph Hollemans, completed about 1612. Joseph, also known as Jasper, Hollemans was the son of Garrett Hollemans, a Dutch sculptor who fled to England in the 1580s and worked from Burton upon Trent, centre of alabaster carving in the 16th and 17th centuries. Joseph worked for clients as illustrious as the House of Cavendish and the Spencer family of Althorp. While there is no evidence that he personally carved the memorial, it is in Burton alabaster of his style and period.

== Notes ==
Legal offices
Preceded by Edward Griffin	Attorney General for England and Wales; 1559–1581	Succeeded by Sir John Popham
Preceded by Sir William Cordell	Master of the Rolls; 1581–1593	Succeeded by Sir Thomas Egerton
