= Holcroft Hall =

Grade II* listed privately owned historic house in Culcheth, Cheshire

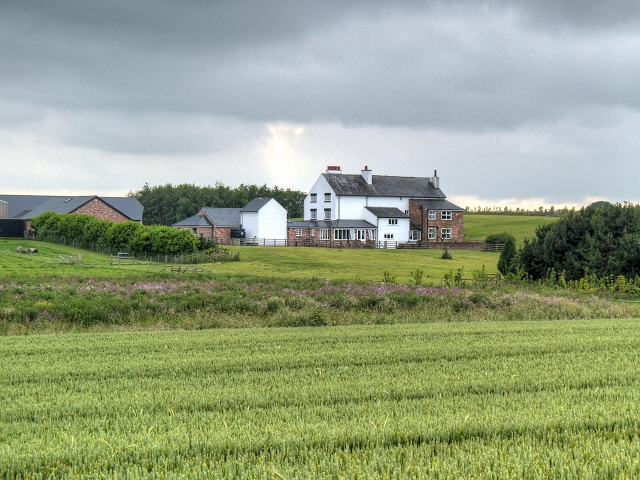
- Holcroft Hall
- Interactive map of the Holcroft Hall area

General information
- Type: Private Residence
- Location: Culcheth, United Kingdom
- Coordinates: 53.4522°N 2.4836°W
- Construction started: 15th Century

Design and construction
- Designations

Listed Building – Grade II*
- Official name: Holcroft Hall
- Designated: 15 November 1966
- Reference no.: 1159651

Holcroft Hall is a Grade II* listed privately owned historic house in Holcroft, Culcheth, Cheshire.

== History ==
The manor of Holcroft was the product of a division of the manor of Culcheth in the mid-13th century, and the Holcrofts may have been descended from the de Culcheth family, the original holders of the manor, although the succession of the estate is not certain before John Holcroft, the lord of the manor in the early 16th century and father of the politician John Holcroft (d.1560) and the courtier Sir Thomas Holcroft (d.1558).

One of the family was Colonel John Holcroft, who favored the Parliamentary side in the Civil War. His eldest daughter, Mary Holcroft, married Colonel Thomas Blood to attempt to gain possession of the estate in the 1670s. Eleanor, daughter of Mary's brother Thomas Holcroft, married Thomas Tyldesley of Myerscough and Morley, and the manor passed to the Tyldesley family until 1761. By 1787, the Hall was owned by Samuel Pool.

== Architecture ==
This late 15th- or early 16th-century farmhouse was enlarged in the 18th century and later centuries. It preserves mullion windows, some timber eaves gutters, and a large chimney stack, as well as some interesting interiors.

== See also ==
- Listed buildings in Culcheth and Glazebury
