= Nevisport =

Outdoor clothing and equipment retailer founded in Fort William

Nevisport Ltd
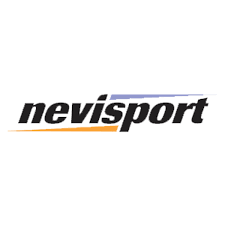
- Company type: Privately held company
- Industry: Retail
- Founded: Fort William (1970)
- Headquarters: Glasgow, United Kingdom
- Key people: Ian A Sykes and Ian D Sutherland
- Products: Clothing, outdoor equipment
- Number of employees: 1001–5000 (2022)
- Website: www.nevisport.com

Nevisport is an outdoor clothing and equipment retailer, specialising in climbing, skiing, camping and general outdoor gear.

== History ==
Founded in 1970 by a pair of highland climbers and outdoor instructors Ian A Sykes MBE and Ian D Sutherland, Nevisport started life with money saved by Sykes.

The first Nevisport occupied a small store at the west end of Fort William's high street and was sustained financially during its first year by Sutherland, who continued to work full-time elsewhere while Sykes ran the shop day to day. Such was the success of the fledgling company it was soon forced to relocate to larger premises and subsequently opened a second store in Glasgow in 1974.

By the spring of 1982 Nevisport had moved its headquarters into a purpose-built retail unit at the end of Fort William's high street which remains the company's flagship store. Nevisport Fort William also incorporates a café and bar as well as a gift shop. During the early 1990s the company moved into Edinburgh and also opened what is the UK's highest outdoor shop on the western slopes of Aonach Mor at the top of the gondola at the Nevis Range ski centre.

In 1997 Nevisport continued its expansion by acquiring an English outdoor chain called Wilderness Ways and an independent store by the name of Nick Estcourts. Shortly afterwards Clive Rowland's store in Aviemore and Marshall's in Aberdeen were also acquired.

In 2004 Sykes and Sutherland retired.

=== Acquisition ===
In October 2007 Nevisport was acquired by Jacobs & Turner Ltd, owner of the Trespass clothing brand. Nevisport's headquarters and warehouse were relocated to Glasgow. New stores were opened in Fraddon, Cornwall and near Fleetwood, Lancashire.

== Stores ==
Nevisport currently has 13 stores around the United Kingdom. Fort William, Glasgow, Edinburgh, Aviemore, Aonach Mor (Nevis Range), Kendal, Fleetwood, Middlesbrough, Manchester, Bents Garden Centre (Warrington), Woking and Fraddon in Cornwall. Selected Nevisport stores also offer ski servicing facilities.
