= Thomas Blood =

Anglo-Irish army officer (1618–1680)

Thomas Allen Blood
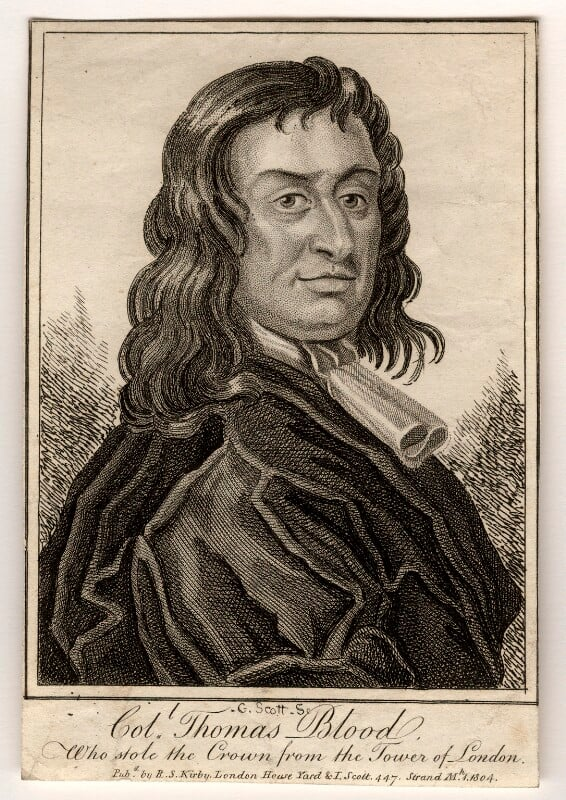
- Portrait by G. Scott, 1804
- Born: 19 March 1618; Ballyvaughan, County Clare, Ireland
- Died: 24 August 1681 (aged 62–63); Westminster, England
- Known for: Attempted theft of the Crown Jewels of England

Thomas Allen Blood (19 March 1618 – 24 August 1680) was an Anglo-Irish army officer and self-styled colonel best known for his attempt to steal the Crown Jewels of England from the Tower of London in 1671. Described in an American source as a "noted bravo and desperado," he was also known for his attempt to kidnap and, later, to kill his enemy, the 1st Duke of Ormond.

== Early life ==
Sources suggest that Blood was born in Ballyvaughan, County Clare, in the Kingdom of Ireland, the son of a successful land-owning blacksmith of English descent, and was partly raised at Sarney, near Dunboyne, in County Meath. He was apparently a Presbyterian. His family was respectable and prosperous (by the standards of the time); his father held lands in Counties Clare, Meath and Wicklow. His grandfather was a member of the Irish Parliament, and had lived at Kilnaboy Castle (also in County Clare). He received his education in Lancashire, England. At the age of 20, he married Maria Holcroft, the daughter of John Holcroft of Holcroft Hall, Culcheth, Cheshire, and Golborne, Lancashire, and returned to Ireland.

At the outbreak of the First English Civil War in 1642, Blood returned to England and initially took up arms with the Royalist forces loyal to Charles I. As the conflict progressed he switched sides and became a lieutenant in Oliver Cromwell's Roundheads. In 1653 at the cessation of hostilities Cromwell awarded Blood land grants as payment for his service and appointed him a justice of the peace. Following the Restoration of King Charles II to the Crowns of the Three Kingdoms in 1660, Blood fled with his family to Ireland. The confiscations and restitutions under the Act of Settlement 1662 (which sought to cancel and annul some of the grants of land and real properties allocated as reward to new holders being Cromwellians under the Act of Settlement 1652) brought Blood to financial ruin, and in return Blood sought to unite his fellow Cromwellians in Ireland to cause insurrection.

== Irish discontent ==
As part of the expression of discontent, Blood conspired to storm Dublin Castle, usurp the government, and kidnap for ransom the 1st Duke of Ormond, who was the Lord Lieutenant of Ireland. On the eve of the attempt, the plot was foiled. Blood managed to evade the authorities by hiding with his countrymen in the mountains, and ultimately escaped to the United Dutch Provinces in the Low Country. A few of Blood's collaborators were captured and executed. As a result, some historians speculated that Blood swore vengeance against Ormond.

While in the Dutch Republic, Blood gained the favour of Admiral de Ruyter, an opponent of the English forces in the Anglo-Dutch Wars, and was implicated in the Scottish Pentland Rising of 1666 by the Scottish Presbyterian Covenanters. At some point during this period, Blood became associated with the wealthy George Villiers, 2nd Duke of Buckingham, who 19th-century commentators believed used Blood as a means to punish his own political and social adversaries, since his own class ranking did not allow him to meet them "in the field".

In 1670, despite his status as a wanted man, Blood returned to England and is believed to have taken the name Ayloffe and practised as a doctor or an apothecary in Romford Market, east of London. A second attempt, this time on the life of the Duke of Ormond, followed.

Since Ormond's return to England, he had taken up residence at Clarendon House. Blood had followed Ormond's movements and noted that he frequently returned late in the evening accompanied by a small number of footmen. On the night of 6 December 1670, Blood and his accomplices attacked Ormond while the latter travelled St James's Street. Ormond was dragged from his coach, bound to one of Blood's henchmen, and taken on horseback along Piccadilly with the intention of hanging him at Tyburn. The gang pinned a paper to Ormond's chest spelling out their reasons for his capture and murder. With one of his servants who had given chase on horseback, Ormond succeeded in freeing himself and escaped. The plot's secrecy meant that Blood was not suspected of the crime, despite a reward being offered for the capture of the attempted assassins. In the King's presence, Ormond's son, Thomas Butler, accused the Duke of Buckingham of being behind the crime. Thomas threatened to shoot Buckingham dead in revenge if his father was murdered.

=== Theft of the Crown Jewels ===
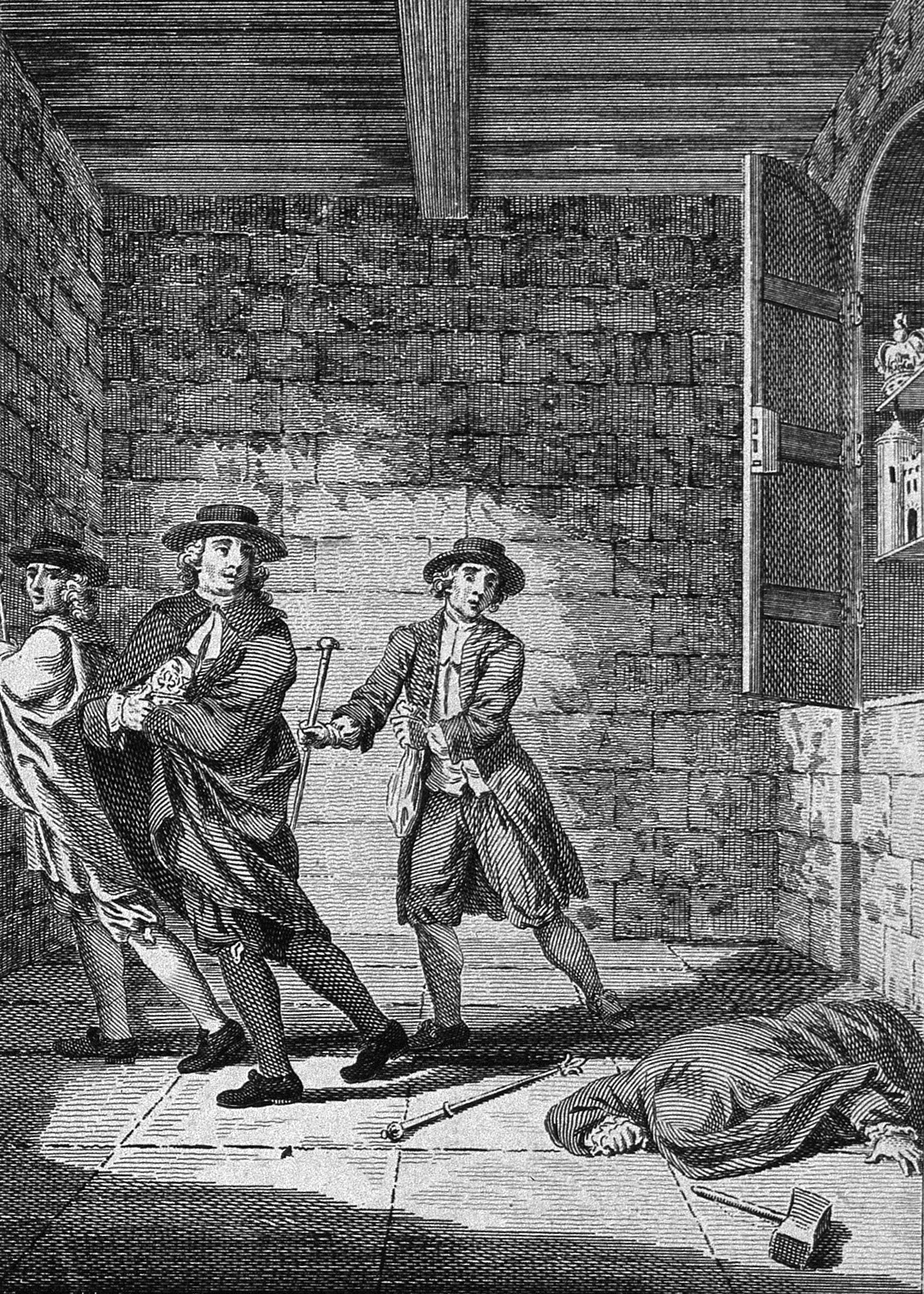
c. 1793 illustration of Blood and his accomplices attempting to steal the regalia

Colonel Blood Stealing the Crown Jewels (Henry Perronet Briggs, 1824)

Blood did not lie low for long, and within six months he made his notorious attempt to steal the Crown Jewels. In April or May 1671 he visited the Tower of London dressed as a parson and accompanied by a female companion pretending to be his wife. The Crown Jewels could be viewed by the payment of a fee to the custodian. While viewing the Crown Jewels, Blood's "wife" feigned a stomach complaint and begged the newly appointed Master of the Jewel House, 77-year-old Talbot Edwards, to fetch her some spirits. Given the proximity of the jewel keeper's domestic quarters to the site of the commotion, Edwards' wife invited them upstairs to their apartment to recover, after which Blood and his wife thanked the Edwardses and left.

Over the following days Blood returned to the Tower to visit the Edwardses and presented Mrs Edwards with four pairs of white gloves as a gesture of thanks. As Blood became ingratiated with the family, an offer was made for a fictitious nephew of Blood's to marry the Edwardses' daughter, who, Blood alleged, would be eligible, by virtue of the marriage, to an income of several hundred pounds.

On 9 May 1671, in furtherance of the deception, Blood convinced Edwards to show the jewels to him, his supposed nephew, and two of his friends while they waited for a dinner that Mrs Edwards was to put on for Blood and his companions. The jewel keeper's apartment was in Martin Tower above a basement where the jewels were kept behind a metal grille. Reports suggest that Blood's accomplices carried canes that concealed rapier blades, daggers, and pocket pistols. In entering the Jewel House, one of the men made a pretence of standing watch outside while the others joined Edwards and Blood. The door was closed and a cloak thrown over Edwards, who was struck with a mallet, knocked to the floor, bound, gagged and stabbed to subdue him.

After removing the grille, Blood used the mallet to flatten the Imperial State Crown of Charles II so that he could hide it beneath his clerical coat. Another conspirator, Blood's brother-in-law Hunt, filed the Sceptre with the Cross in two (as it did not fit in their bag), while the third man, Perrot, stuffed the Sovereign's Orb down his breeches. Meanwhile Edwards refused to stay subdued and fought against his bindings. Accounts vary as to whether Edwards' struggle caused sufficient disturbance to raise the alarm or whether the attempt was foiled in more fortuitous circumstances.

Popular reports describe Edwards' son, Wythe, returning from military service in Flanders, happening upon the attempted theft. At the door of the Jewel House, Wythe was met by the impromptu guard, who challenged him, before the young Edwards entered and went upstairs. The "guard" then alerted his fellow gang members. At around the same time, the elder Edwards managed to free his gag, and raised the alarm shouting, "Treason! Murder! The crown is stolen!"

As Blood and his gang fled to their horses waiting at St Catherine's Gate, they dropped the sceptre and fired on the warders who attempted to stop them, wounding one. One drawbridge guard was struck with fear and failed to discharge his musket. As they ran along the Tower wharf it is said they joined the calls for alarm to confuse the guards until they were chased down by Captain Beckman, brother-in-law of the younger Edwards. Although Blood shot at him, he missed and was captured before reaching the Iron Gate. Having fallen from his cloak, the crown was found while Blood refused to give up, struggling with his captors and declaring, "It was a gallant attempt, however unsuccessful! It was for a crown!" The globe and orb were recovered although several stones were missing and others were loose. Hunt and Perrot were also taken, but not punished.

=== Aftermath ===
Following his capture, Blood refused to answer to anyone but the King and was consequently taken to the palace in chains, where he was questioned by King Charles, Prince Rupert, and others. King Charles asked Blood, "What if I should give you your life?", and Blood replied, "I would endeavour to deserve it, Sire!" To the disgust of Ormond, Blood was not only pardoned but also given land in Ireland worth £500 a year. In contrast, Edwards' family was awarded less than £300 by the King, a sum which was never paid in full, and he returned to his duties at the Tower regaling visitors with his tales of the attempted theft. He died in 1674 and his tomb is in the chapel of St Peter's Ad Vincula, at the Tower of London.

The reasons for the King's pardon are unknown. Some historians have speculated that the King feared an uprising in revenge by followers of Blood, who were thought to have taken an oath to their leader. Others speculate that the King had a fondness for audacious scoundrels such as Blood, and that he was amused by the Irishman's claim that the jewels were worth only £6,000 as opposed to the £100,000 at which the Crown had valued them.

There is also a suggestion that the King was flattered and amused by Blood's revelation that he had previously intended to kill him while he was bathing in the Thames but had been swayed otherwise, having found himself in "awe of majesty." It has also been suggested that his actions had the connivance of the King, who was very short of money at the time.

Following his pardon, Blood became a familiar figure around London and made frequent appearances at Court, where he was employed to advocate in the claims of suitors to the Crown. In John Wilmot, 2nd Earl of Rochester's History of Insipids, he wrote of Blood:

Blood, that wears treason in his face,
Villain complete in parson's gown,
How much he is at court in grace
For stealing Ormond and the crown!
Since loyalty does no man good,
Let's steal the King, and outdo Blood!

In 1679 Blood fell into dispute with the Duke of Buckingham, his former patron, and Buckingham sued Blood for £10,000, for insulting remarks Blood had made about his character. In the proceedings that followed, Blood was convicted by the King's Bench in 1680 and granted bail, although he never paid the damages.

== Death ==
Blood was released from prison in July 1680 but had fallen into a coma by 22 August. He died on 24 August at his home in Bowling Alley, Westminster. His body was buried in the churchyard of St Margaret's Church (now Christchurch Gardens) near St. James's Park. It is believed that his body was exhumed by the authorities for confirmation: such was his reputation for trickery, it was suspected he had faked his death and funeral to avoid paying his debt to Buckingham. Blood's epitaph read:

Here lies the man who boldly hath run through
More villainies than England ever knew;
And ne'er to any friend he had was true.
Here let him then by all unpitied lie,
And let's rejoice his time was come to die.

=== Legacy ===
Blood's son Holcroft Blood became a distinguished military engineer rising to the rank of Brigadier-General; he commanded the Duke of Marlborough's artillery at the Battle of Blenheim. Descendants including General Bindon Blood, civil engineer William Bindon Blood, Maurice Petherick, and Brian Inglis, had distinguished careers in British and Irish society.

The Newcastle-Upon-Tyne, England based indie professional wrestler Thomas Blood took his name directly from the historical figure although his character is not based on him.

== Depictions ==
- The 1934 movie Colonel Blood, by W. P. Lipscomb, depicts Blood's theft of the Crown jewels and his subsequent pardon.
- Blood may have been, in part, the inspiration for a character in Rafael Sabatini's novel Captain Blood, which in turn resulted in several film adaptations, most famously the 1935 version starring Errol Flynn and Olivia de Havilland.
- Michael Wilding portrayed Blood in the 1957 episode "The Trial of Colonel Blood" of NBC's anthology series, The Joseph Cotten Show.
- The theft of the jewels was heavily fictionalised in the film The King's Thief
- Blood was a character in George MacDonald Fraser's 1983 novel The Pyrates which was filmed by the BBC in 1986
- Blood was a major character in a humorous play about the theft, called The Crown Jewels, written by screenwriter Simon Nye and performed at the Garrick Theatre in London in 2023. The part was played by Aidan McArdle, and the cast included Al Murray as Charles II, Neil Morrissey as his accomplice Perrot, and Mel Giedroyc as Mrs Edwards.
- In November 2024, Channel 4 broadcast A History of Royal Scandals series 2 episode 4 entitled Crime in which Suzannah Lipscomb discussed Blood's theft of the Crown Jewels, his meeting with King Charles, and the mystery surrounding his burial.
