= John Holcroft =

English politician

John Holcroft (died 1656) was an English politician who sat in the House of Commons variously between 1640 and 1648. He fought in the Parliamentary army in the English Civil War.

In April 1640, Holcroft was elected Member of Parliament for Liverpool in the Short Parliament. He was Mayor of Liverpool in 1644. In 1646 he was elected MP for Wigan in the Long Parliament and sat until 1648 when he was excluded under Pride's Purge. He was mayor of Liverpool again in 1657.

Holcroft married Margaret Heywood. His daughter Maria married Thomas Blood who stole the Crown Jewels. His grandson was Holcroft Blood, an artillery commander under the Duke of Marlborough.

Parliament of England
Vacant Parliament suspended since 1629	Member of Parliament for Liverpool; 1640; With: James Lord Cranfield	Succeeded by Sir Richard Wynn, 2nd Baronet; John Moore
Preceded by Orlando Bridgeman; Alexander Rigby	Member of Parliament for Wigan; Alexander Rigby; With: 1646–1648	Succeeded by Alexander Rigby
