= Wigan railway station =

Wigan railway station may refer to the following railway stations in Wigan, England

- Operational stations
  - Wigan North Western railway station, the main station for long-distance services called Wigan from 1838 to 1924.
  - Wigan Wallgate railway station, on the Manchester to Kirby and Manchester to Southport lines called Wigan from 1848 to 1924.
- Closed stations
  - Wigan Central railway station, former GC then LNER station from 1892, closed in 1965 and demolished in 1974.
  - Wigan Chapel Lane railway station, former WBR station, open as Wigan from 1832 to 1838 when it was superseded by Wigan North Western railway station.
  - Wigan Darlington Street railway station, former WJR station from 1894 to 1892 when it was superseded by Wigan Central railway station.

See also

- Wigan station group
- Wigan bus station
