= Old railway lines in Wigan =

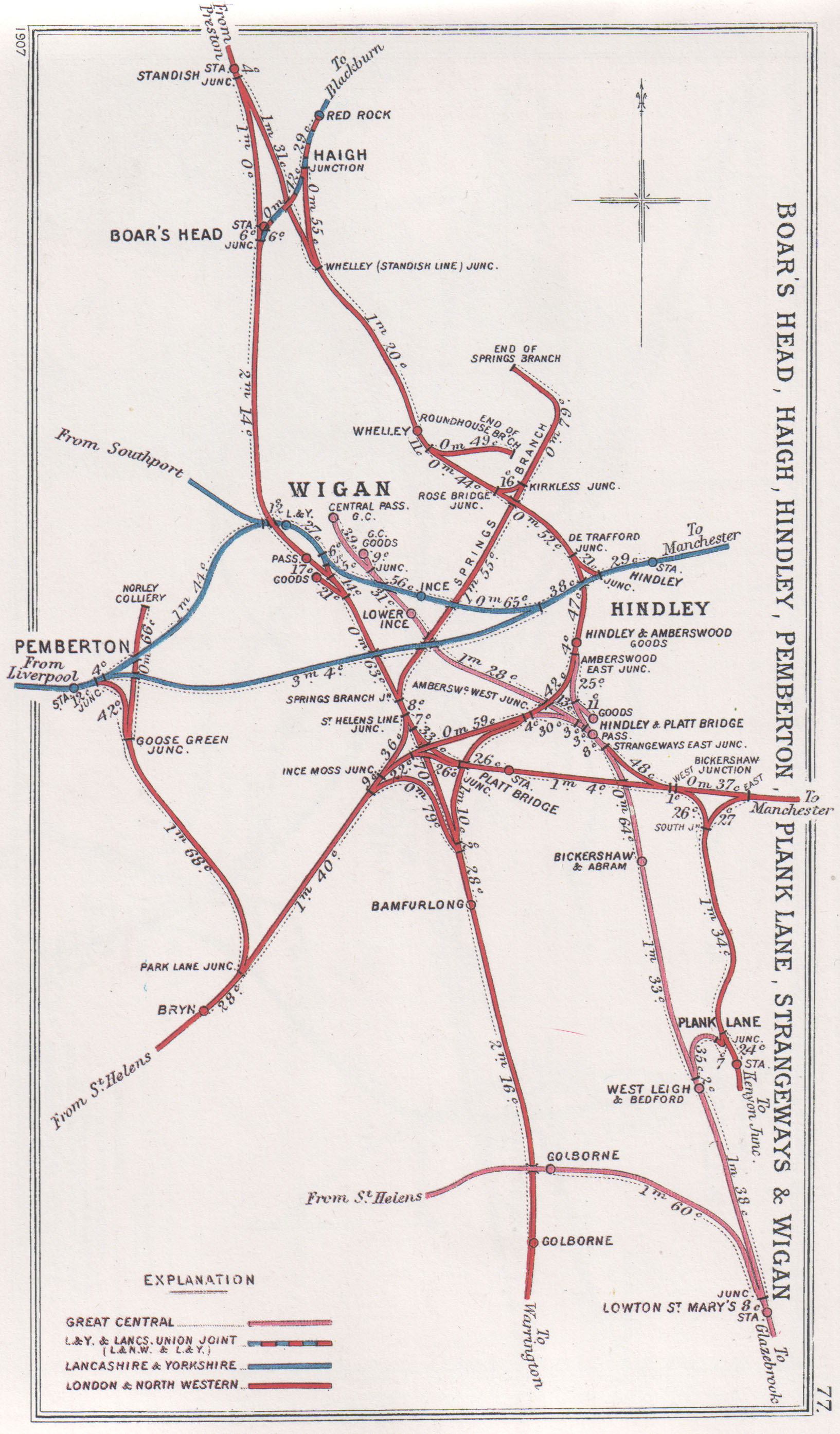
A Railway Clearing House map showing railway lines around Wigan in 1907

The railway system in Wigan started development in the 19th century during the Industrial Revolution. The first railway built in the town was the Wigan Branch Railway which was opened on 3 September 1832 to serve the many collieries in the area; this was a branch line of the Liverpool and Manchester Railway, the first inter-city railway. By the turn of the 20th century, Wigan had numerous railway stations widely available across the borough, used by both freight and passengers. Many of the lines were originally built for freight which were later converted, as the owners saw the profitability of allowing passengers, to carry passenger trains.

After the Beeching Report (1963), which led to many low-usage railway lines and stations closing across the country, some railways and stations around Wigan fell into disuse. The Manchester and Wigan Railway closed in 1969, the Chorley-to-Wigan line (operated by the Lancashire Union Railway) closed to passengers in 1960 and to goods on 25 May 1971, and one of the last lines to close was the Whelley Loop which was closed to both freight and passengers in 1976.

== History ==
Railways were used as a more efficient way of transporting goods and resources around the country with more speed and efficiency than canals. This led to more and more pit owners creating private industrial railways running from the canals and spurring off mainlines, right up to their pits.

== Closed stations ==
- Amberswood Station (1 January 1872 – unknown) Closed to passengers 1 March 1872
- Bamfurlong Station (1 April 1878 – 27 November 1950)
- Bickershaw and Abram Station (1 April 1884 – 2 November 1964)
- Boar's Head Station (1 December 1869 – 31 January 1949)
- Golborne Station North - Great Central Line (3 January 1900 – 3 March 1952)
- Golborne Station South (19 October 1839 – 2 May 1967) Closed to passengers 6 January 1961

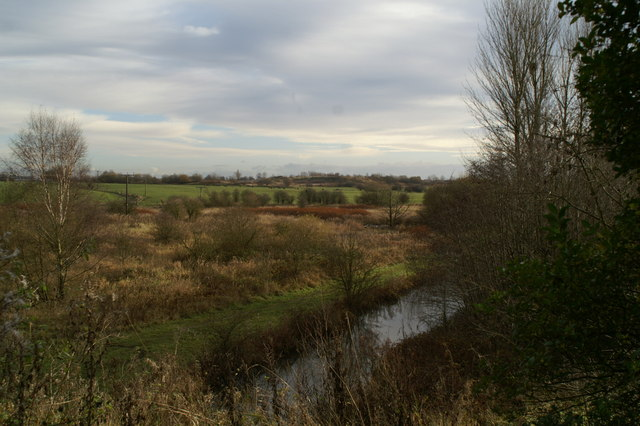
Site of Hindley and Platt Bridge station in November 2008

- Hindley & Amberswood Goods Station. Changed to Hindley South in 1950 (1 April 1884 – 2 November 1964)
- Lower Ince Station (1 April 1884 – 2 November 1964)
- Lowton St Mary's Station (1 April 1884 – 22 April 1968) Closed to passengers 2 November 1964
- Plank Lane Station (1 October 1903 - 22 February 1915)
- Platt Bridge Station (1 September 1864 - 1 May 1961)
- Red Rock Station (1 December 1869 – 2 September 1957) Closed to passengers 26 September 1949
- Standish Station (31 October 1838 - 23 May 1949)
- West Leigh and Bedford Station (1 April 1884 – 2 November 1964)
- Whelley Station (1 January 1872 – unknown) Closed to passengers 1 March 1872
- Wigan Central (3 October 1892 – 5 April 1965) Closed to passengers 2 November 1964.
- Wigan Chapel Lane (3 September 1832 – 31 October 1838)
- Wigan Darlington Street (1 April 1884 – 3 October 1892)

== Contemporary railways ==
As of 2022, there are two major stations in the town. Wigan North Western (managed by Avanti West Coast) is on the West Coast Main Line, served by trains from London, Manchester Airport and Birmingham to the North and Scotland. South of the station there is a connecting line through Bryn to St Helens and Liverpool; this was electrified in May 2015. Wigan Wallgate (managed by Northern) is served by trains from Manchester via either Bolton or Atherton; the routes diverge east of Hindley. These continue west of Wigan Wallgate to Southport or, via Pemberton, to Kirkby, where there are connections to Liverpool.
