= Culcheth railway station =

Former railway station in England

Culcheth
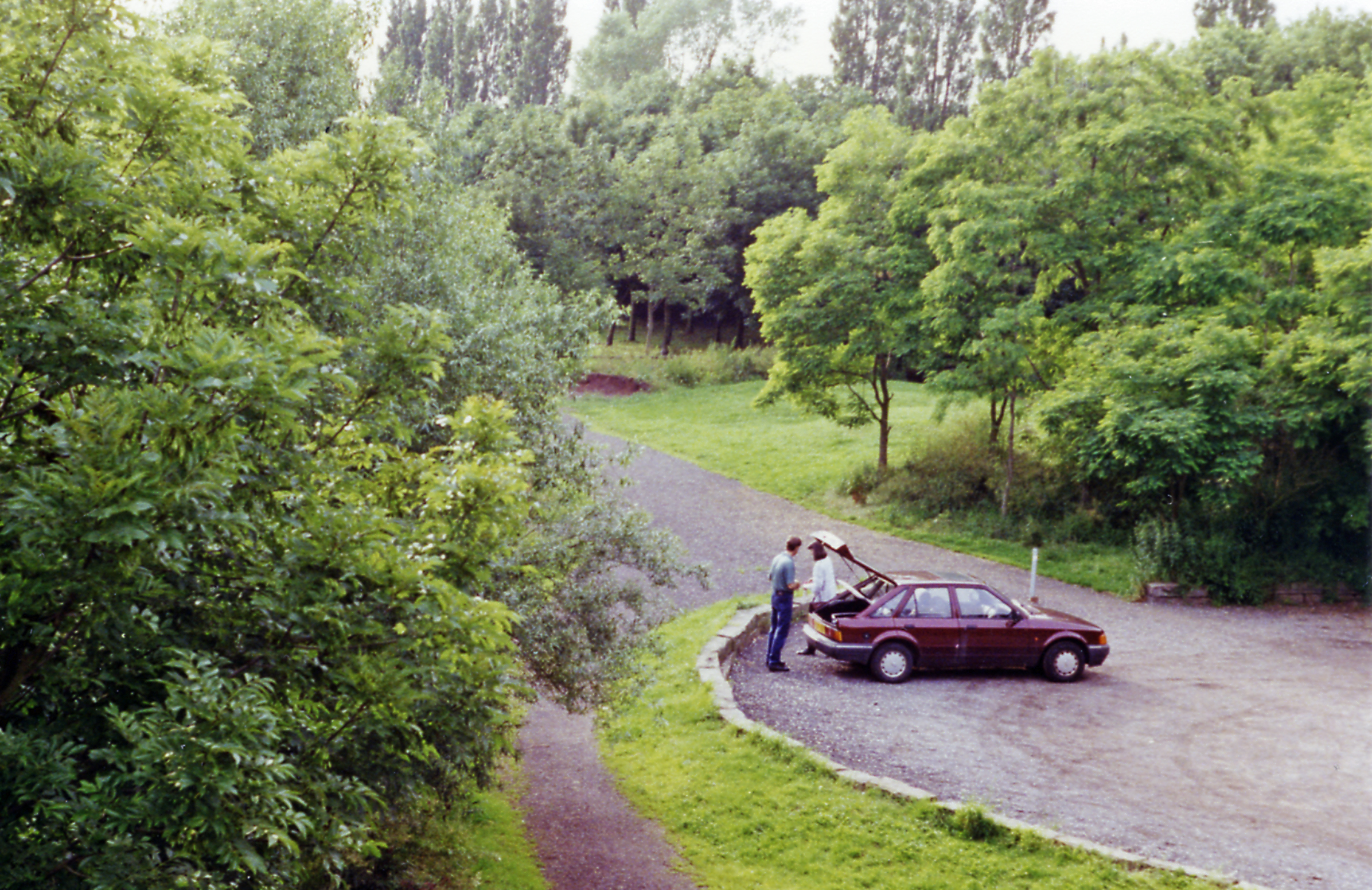
- Site of the station in 1996

General information
- Location: Culcheth, Warrington; England
- Coordinates: 53.4499°N 2.5303°W
- Grid reference: SJ648949
- Platforms: 2

Other information
- Status: Disused

History
- Original company: Wigan Junction Railways
- Pre-grouping: Great Central Railway
- Post-grouping: London and North Eastern Railway

Key dates
- 1 April 1884: Station opened
- 2 November 1964: Station closed to passengers
- 4 January 1965: Station closed completely
Location

Culcheth railway station served the village of Culcheth, Lancashire, England. It was west of the bridge where Wigshaw Lane crossed the railway.

== History ==
Culcheth station opened on 1 April 1884 along with six other stations on the Wigan Junction Railways (WJR), which was backed by the Manchester, Sheffield and Lincolnshire Railway (MS&LR).

The Manchester, Sheffield and Lincolnshire Railway changed its name in 1897 to the Great Central Railway (GCR). The GCR absorbed the WJR on 1 January 1906.

The WJR line ran through Lancashire from Glazebrook West Junction to Wigan Centralbut was also a part of the bigger MS&LR/GCR network and therefore trains were originally provided by the MS&LR.

== Services ==
In April 1884 there were seven trains in each direction per day, all running between Manchester Central railway station and Wigan Central. Of these six called at Culcheth. Two trains each way ran on Sundays, calling at all stations en route.

From 1900 until 1952 Culcheth was also served by passenger trains running to St Helens Central,.

In 1922 six "Down" (towards St Helens and Wigan) trains called at the station, "Weekdays Only" (Mondays to Saturdays.) These all ran All Stations from Manchester Central to St Helens via Glazebrook and Culcheth. It is difficult to be certain from the timetable whether these trains split at Lowton St Mary's with a portion proceeding to Wigan Central, or whether passengers for Wigan had to change, but in either event those same six trains also took Culcheth passengers All Stations to Wigan. Given the dwell times for St Helens trains, it appears that theirs was a through service.

A lone All Stations Manchester to Wigan train - 18:42 from Culcheth - had no St Helens connection or portion, serving the Wigan Central line only.

Three Down trains, one Fridays and Saturdays only and two Saturdays only, appeared to start at Culcheth calling All Stations to Wigan Central, with no St Helens portion or connection. It may be that these trains originated at Liverpool Central, turning West to North at the triangular Glazebrook West Junction, but the timetable doesn't seem to confirm this.

The "Up" service was broadly similar, but the mix of all week and Saturdays only/excepted was more complex.

No trains ran on Sundays.

In WW2 the line through Culcheth was more frequently used, though after 1945 the line started to deteriorate.

The line to and from St Helens was closed when the passenger service was withdrawn on 3 March 1952.

The station closed to passengers on 2 November 1964 and to freight in 1965 although the line survived as freight only until 1968.

The line through Culcheth was also a diversionary route and a route by which traffic such as Summer Saturday holiday specials could bypass busy spots, such as Wigan. Pixton, for example, has a fine 1961 shot of a Summer Saturday Sheffield to Blackpool train at Lowton St Mary's which will have passed through Culcheth. It would bear right at Hindley South onto the Whelley Loop and then join the WCML at Standish, bypassing Wigan altogether.

By far and away the most heavily loaded, but sporadic, passenger trains through the station were for Haydock Park racecourse.

== The station site ==
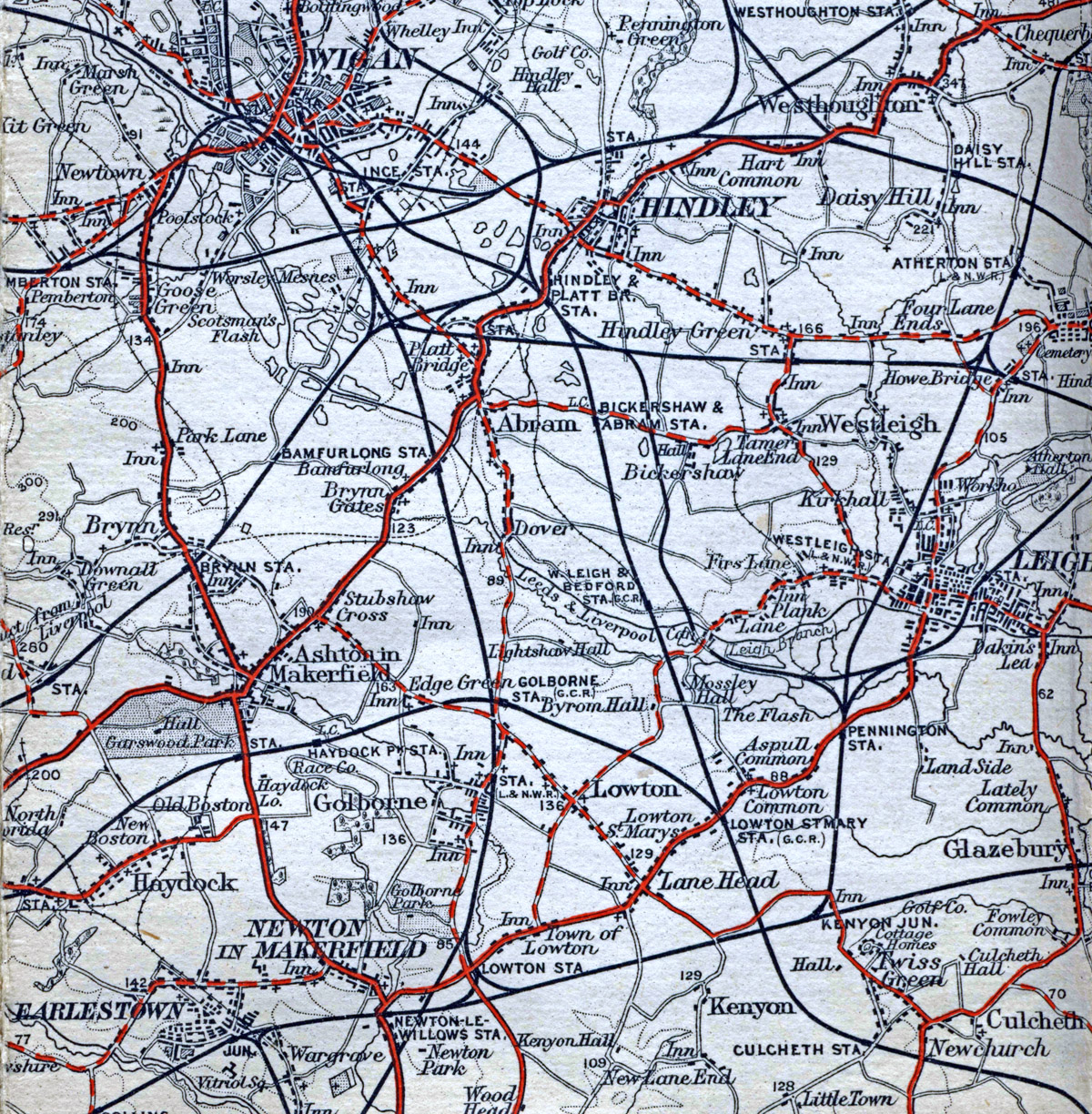
1911 map showing the location of Culcheth station (bottom right) on the GCR line from Glazebrook Junction to Wigan Central

The station was demolished in 1977 to be replaced by Culcheth Linear Park. The remains of a rear wall of one of the platforms can still be identified opposite the Linear Park's car park.

== Routes ==
Preceding station	Disused railways	Following station
Lowton St Mary's; Line and station closed	Great Central Railway; Wigan Junction Railways	Newchurch Halt; Line and station closed

== Sources ==
- Bradshaw, George (1985) [July 1922]. Bradshaw's General Railway and Steam Navigation guide for Great Britain and Ireland: A reprint of the July 1922 issue. Newton Abbot: David & Charles. ISBN 978-0-7153-8708-5. OCLC 12500436.
- Butt, R. V. J. (October 1995). The Directory of Railway Stations: details every public and private passenger station, halt, platform and stopping place, past and present (1st ed.). Sparkford: Patrick Stephens Ltd. ISBN 978-1-85260-508-7. OCLC 60251199. OL 11956311M.
- Conolly, W. Philip (1998). British railways pre-grouping atlas and gazetteer (9th impression; 5th ed.). Shepperton: Ian Allan. ISBN 978-0-7110-0320-0. OCLC 221481275.
- Dow, George (1985) [1962]. Great Central, Volume Two: Dominion of Watkin 1864–1899. Shepperton: Ian Allan. ISBN 978-0-7110-1469-5. OCLC 655324061.
- Fields, N; Gilbert, A C; Knight, N R (1980), Liverpool to Manchester into the Second Century, Manchester Transport Museum Society, ISBN 978-0-900857-19-5
- Pixton, Bob (1996), The Archive Photographs Series Widnes and St Helens Railways, The Chalford Publishing Company, ISBN 0-7524-0751-1
- Smith, Paul; Turner, Keith (2012), Railway Atlas Then and Now, Ian Allan Publishing, ISBN 978-0-7110-3695-6
- Suggitt, Gordon (2004). Lost Railways of Merseyside and Greater Manchester. Newbury: Countryside Books. ISBN 978-1-85306-869-0.
- Sweeney, Dennis (2013). The Wigan Junction Railways. Leigh: Triangle Publishing. ISBN 978-0-9550030-5-9.
