= Culcheth =

Village near Warrington, England

Coordinates: 53.4517°N 2.5218°W

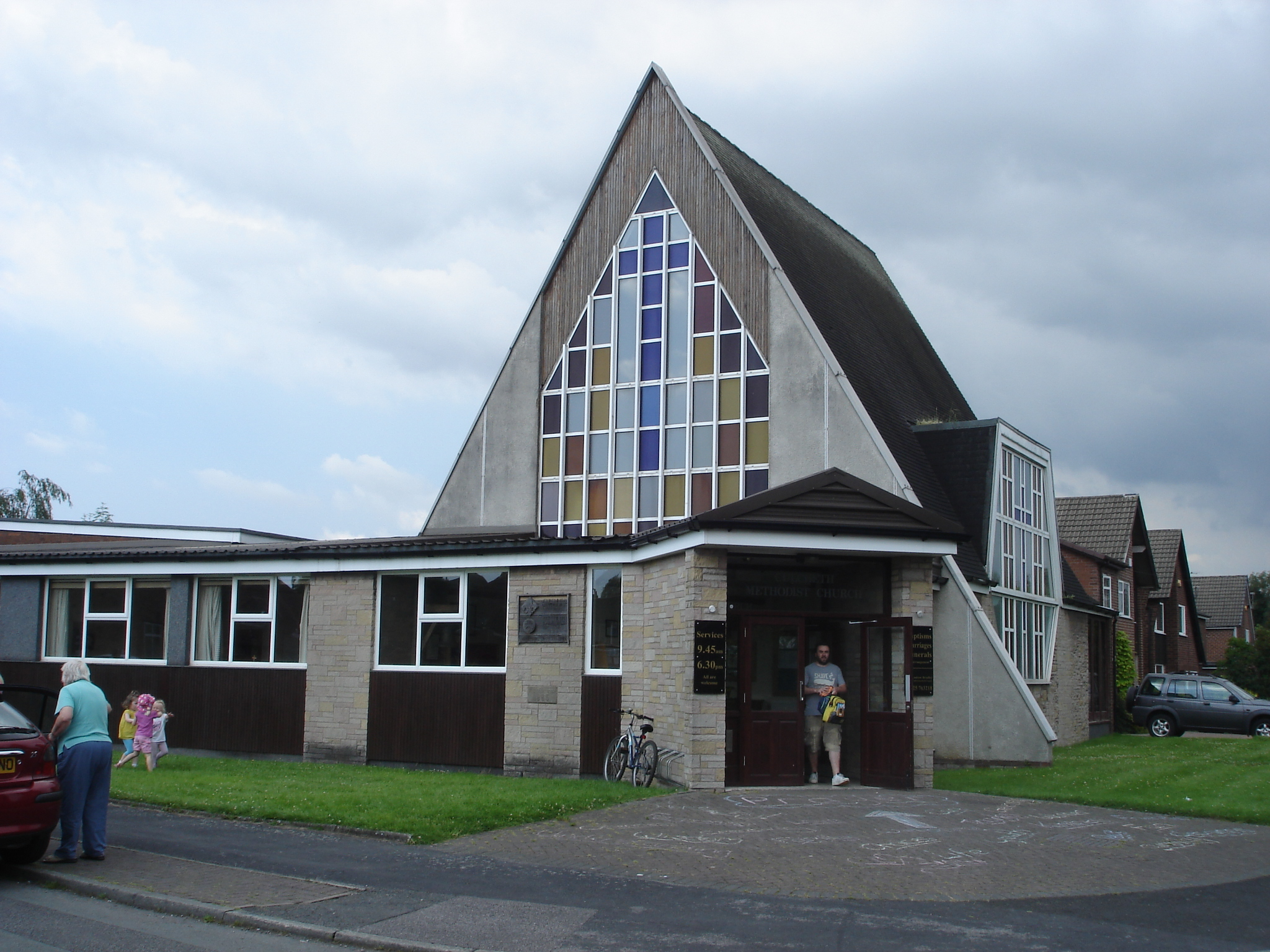
- Methodist church

- Location within Cheshire
- Population: 11,454 (2001)
- OS grid reference: SJ653951
- Civil parish: Culcheth and Glazebury
- Unitary authority: Warrington
- Ceremonial county: Cheshire
- Region: North West
- Country: England
- Sovereign state: United Kingdom
- Post town: WARRINGTON
- Postcode district: WA3
- Dialling code: 01925
- Police: Cheshire
- Fire: Cheshire
- Ambulance: North West
- UK Parliament: Warrington North

Culcheth is a village in the civil parish of Culcheth and Glazebury, in the Warrington district, in Cheshire, England, six miles (10 km) north-east of Warrington.

Lying within the boundaries of the historic county of Lancashire, Culcheth is primarily residential, with a large village green. The old railway line is now known as Culcheth Linear Park.

== Toponymy ==
The name Culcheth is first attested in 1201, in the form Culchet; other early attestations include Kulchit (1242) and Culchith, Kilchiche, Kylchiz (1292). The name derives from the Common Brittonic words that survive in modern Welsh as cul ("narrow") and coed ("woodland"), a pairing found in the names of several other British places, such as Culgaith (Cumbria), Colquite (Cornwall), Blaencilgoed (Dyfed), and Culcoed (Dyfed and Gwynedd).

== History ==
The area is known to have been established before or around the time of the Norman conquest, from its mention in the Domesday Book. Culcheth Hall was latterly owned by the Withington family until its demolition after the Second World War.

The infamous Colonel Thomas Blood, who nearly succeeded in stealing the Crown Jewels, was married in Winwick, and lived for a while at Holcroft Hall (on Holcroft Lane, Culcheth).

In 1899, the Salford Board of Guardians, an ad hoc authority administering the Poor Law, purchased land in the village for the building of children's cottage homes. In 1903, 24 cottages were erected (each housing 12-14 children), alongside a hospital with capacity for 32 people, and separate lodgings for nursing staff and the superintendent. Attending school until the age of fourteen, male children subsequently took up roles on the site in its various workshops, including a shoemaker's shop, joiner's shop, painter's shop, plumber's and engineer's shop and a bakehouse. These roles were supervised by experienced tradespeople and served the needs of the site. According to the Rector of the parish O. R. Plant in A History of Newchurch Parish (1928):

These numerous centres of activity, together with the large mixed farm, makes the Colony [sic] practically self-contained, and it is a rare occurrence to see any outside tradesmen at work on the grounds. The value of the training is shown when the children leave the Homes and almost without any exception they do well and make head way.

Plant does not elaborate on the role of girls who lived there, but he notes that all genders learned gardening skills, and that the experienced tradespeople included both men and women.

The cottage homes were closed in 1936, just a few years after the dissolution of the Board under the Local Government Act 1929, which ended Poor Law unions.

In the post-war era, the site was turned into a psychiatric facility, Newchurch Hospital. In the mid-1990s the buildings were converted into private residences, and the site designated as a Conservation Area.

The Culcheth Laboratories were established in 1950 in the south-west of the village, administered by the United Kingdom Atomic Energy Authority (UKAEA).

On 11 February 2023 Brianna Ghey was murdered in Culcheth Linear Park.

== Governance and politics ==
Local government in Culcheth has been administered by Lancashire County Council (1889–1974), Leigh Rural District Council (1894–1933), Culcheth Parish Council (1894–1933) and Golborne Urban District (1933–1974).

Today, Culcheth is administered by Culcheth and Glazebury Parish Council, as well as by Warrington Borough Council (both since 1974). On 1 April 1998, the Warrington unitary authority was created, of which Culcheth is a part.

Culcheth was formerly a township in the parish of Newchurch-Kenyon. In 1866 Culceth became a civil parish. On 1 October 1933 the parish was abolished and merged with Golborne and Croft. In 1931 the parish had a population of 2730.

Culcheth (along with its neighbouring villages Glazebury and Croft) form the Warrington Borough Council ward of Culcheth, Glazebury and Croft. Although the Labour Party took all three seats in this ward in the local elections of 2016, in 2021 they all changed hands to the Conservatives.

The ward forms part of the Warrington North parliamentary constituency, which has been represented by Labour MP Charlotte Nichols since 2019. Nichols replaced Helen Jones as MP, who lives in the village centre with her family.

At the 2012 municipal elections, Chris Vobe (son of Helen Jones MP) became the first Labour Party Councillor for Culcheth since the mid-1990s, taking his seat on Warrington Borough Council at the Town Hall on 14 May 2012, with Culcheth having been represented on Warrington Borough Council by three Conservative councillors from 1996 to 2012. Chris Vobe stood down from his position in 2016.

Cheshire Constabulary has established a police community base in Culcheth Scout Centre in agreement with the local scout group. This innovation allows local police officers to spend more time in the community and makes it easier for people to contact them. Without this arrangement police officers would have to be based at Warrington Police Station, which is several miles away from their 'beat'.

== Transport ==
Culcheth has main road links into Warrington (A574), and the M62 motorway into Liverpool and Manchester. It is also accessible via Common Lane (the B5207 from Lowton), linking to the A580 East Lancashire Road, and Holcroft Lane (the B5212) which meets the A57 Warrington-Manchester road near Warburton Toll Bridge.

Warrington's Own Buses operate bus services through the village centre.

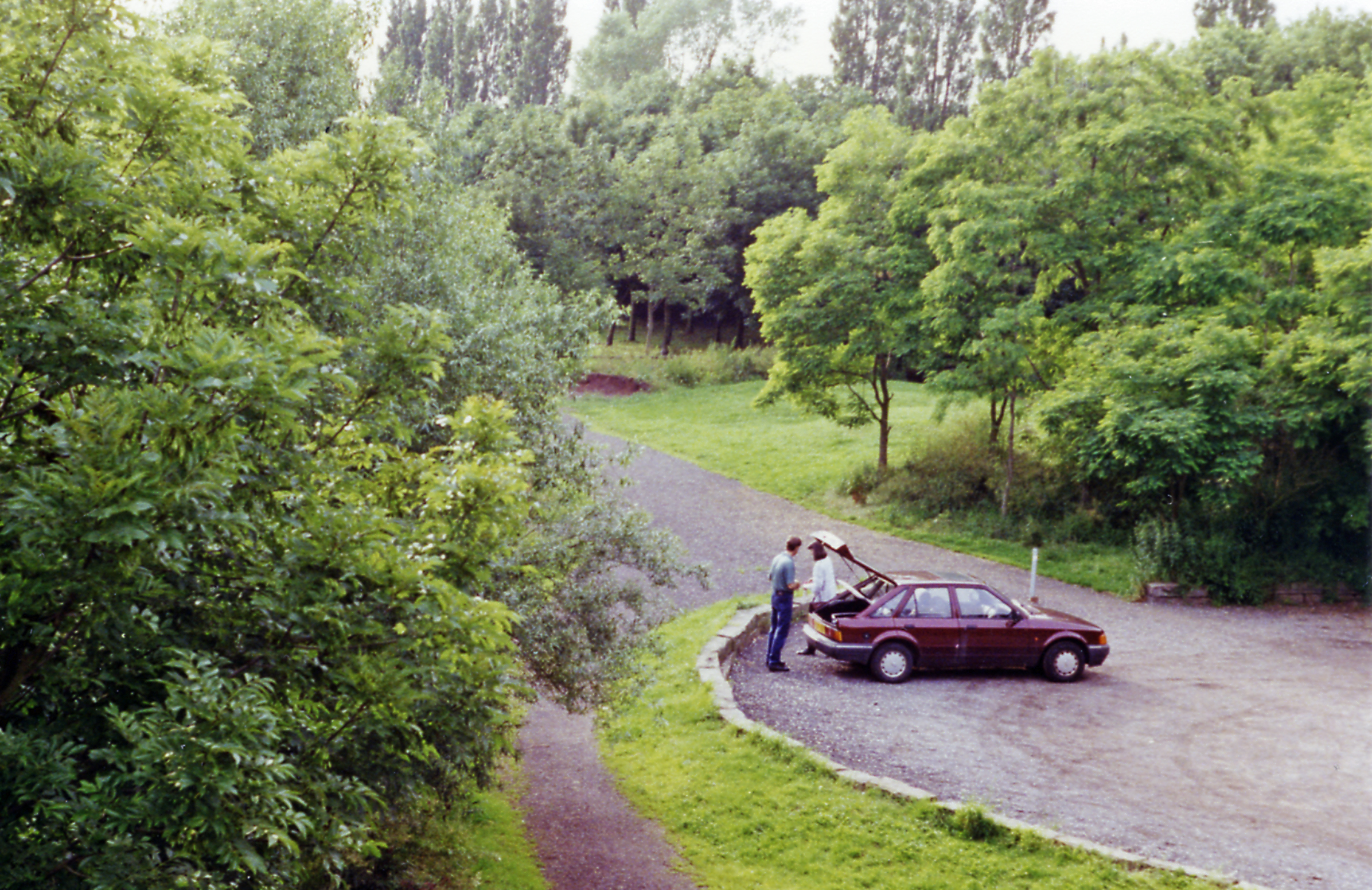
Site of the former Culcheth Railway Station, now the main entrance to Culcheth Linear Park accessible from Wigshaw Lane.

Between 1884 and 1964, Culcheth was served by three railway stations on the Great Central Railway (GCR) line from Manchester Central between Glazebrook and Wigan Central railway station. The station names were Kenyon Junction, Culcheth and Newchurch Halt respectively. All were affected by the Beeching cuts, either directly or as a result of the closing of connecting lines. Like many parts of the country, this left the village without any rail access, a phenomenon believed to affect places in multiple negative ways. The line between the stations has since been turned into Culcheth Linear Park, with the park's HQ situated on top of Culcheth station's foundations.

The nearest operating railway stations are at Birchwood and Glazebrook, both on the line from Liverpool Lime Street to Manchester Piccadilly.

== Economy ==
The science and business parks at nearby Birchwood employ around 5,000 people. The Taylor Industrial Estate / Taylor Business Park provides rented premises and facilities to many small and medium-sized businesses on the outskirts of the village on the road between Culcheth and Risley.

There are two supermarkets in the village centre as well as a wide range of smaller specialist shops. There is also CPS shopping centre which is located in the centre of Culcheth village, and has been home to a wide variety of small independent shops for more than 50 years.

== Religion ==
Newchurch Parish Church, part of the Church of England, viewed from Church Lane.

Culcheth has four churches: Newchurch Parish Church, Culcheth Methodist Church, Culcheth Christian Fellowship, Hob Hey Lane and the Grace Fellowship Church which meets at Culcheth High School. The nearest Roman Catholic church is St Lewis's, which is in the nearby village of Croft.

== Education ==
The village is well provided with schools. Culcheth High School opened in 1931, The school form closed in 2014. The school was picked as Warrington's 'Pathfinder' school under the now-defunct 'Building Schools for the Future' scheme, and the brand new school buildings opened in July 2010. The old school buildings were demolished to make way for the new school playing fields.

The village also has three primary schools: Twiss Green Community Primary School, Culcheth Community Primary School and Newchurch Community Primary School.

== Sport ==
Leigh Golf Club is located to the north of Culcheth.

The Culcheth Sports Club (formerly the Daten) provides a wide range of sports facilities such as table tennis, cricket, tennis, croquet and bowls. The Sports Club also has teams in various leagues in different sports, including numerous table tennis teams, a football team, a tennis league and a croquet team.

Culcheth Eagles ARLFC is a successful rugby league team, which runs many youth teams and an open age team, which all compete in the North West Counties leagues.

== Culture and community ==
The Culcheth and Glazebury Christmas Market (formerly Victorian Day) is a village event held in late November each year with gazebos and market stalls complementing the Gift and Craft Fayres taking place in the Parish and Methodist Halls. The whole event is crowned by carols and the Christmas light switch-on at the village green.

== Notable people ==
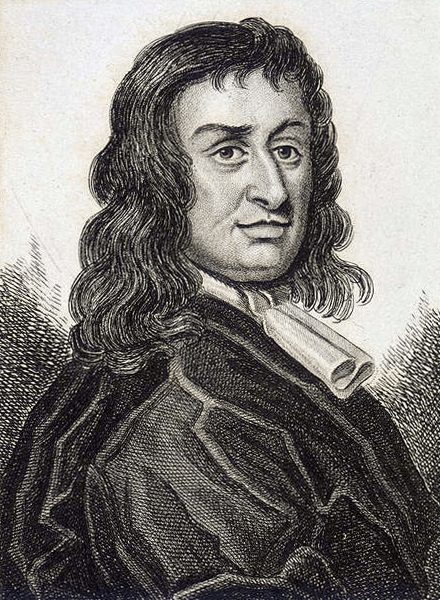
Thomas Blood, 1813

- Sir John Holcroft (pre-1498–1560) of Holcroft Hall, Culcheth, a soldier, politician, and landowner
- Sir Thomas Holcroft (1505 in Holcroft Hall, Culcheth – 1558), a courtier, soldier, politician and landowner.
- Col. Thomas Blood (1618–1680), adventurer who attempted to steal the Crown Jewels; may have lived in Culcheth.
- Walton Newbold (1888 in Culcheth – 1943), the first of the four Communist Party of Great Britain members to be elected as MPs in the United Kingdom.
- John Bridge (1915–2006) bomb disposal expert of the Royal Navy Volunteer Reserve
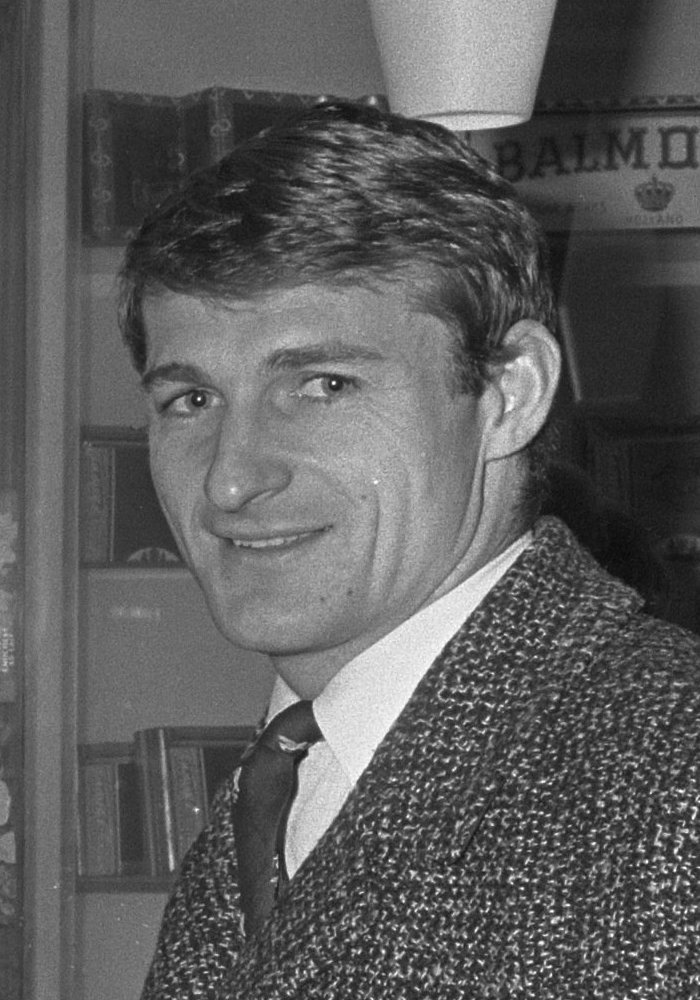
  Roger Hunt, football player for the winning 1966 World Cup team and Liverpool F.C.
- Roger Hunt (1938 in Glazebury – 2021), footballer; 404 appearances for Liverpool F.C. with 286 goals, member of England's 1966 World Cup-winning team.
- Donald Adamson (1939 in Culcheth – 2024), a British literary scholar, author and historian.
- Andie Airfix (born 1946), graphic designer of album covers for famous musicians.
- Daniel Ryan (born 1968 in Culcheth), an English actor and writer.
- Andy Burnham (born 1970), Leader of the Labour Party and Prime Minister of the United Kingdom from 2026, former Mayor of Greater Manchester from 2017 to 2026, and previously the MP for Leigh from 2001 to 2017, was brought up in Culcheth.
- Andy Saunders (born 1974) is a British author and NASA photography expert who currently lives in Culcheth.

== Twin town ==
- Saint-Leu-la-Forêt, France

== See also ==
- Listed buildings in Culcheth and Glazebury
