= West Leigh and Bedford railway station =

Former railway station in England

West Leigh and Bedford

General information
- Location: Crankwood, Leigh, Wigan; England
- Coordinates: 53.4952°N 2.5691°W
- Grid reference: SD624000
- Platforms: 2

Other information
- Status: Disused

History
- Original company: Wigan Junction Railways
- Pre-grouping: Great Central Railway
- Post-grouping: LNER

Key dates
- 1 April 1884: Station opened as "Plank Lane for West Leigh"
- 1893: Station renamed "West Leigh and Bedford"
- 2 November 1964: Station closed
Location

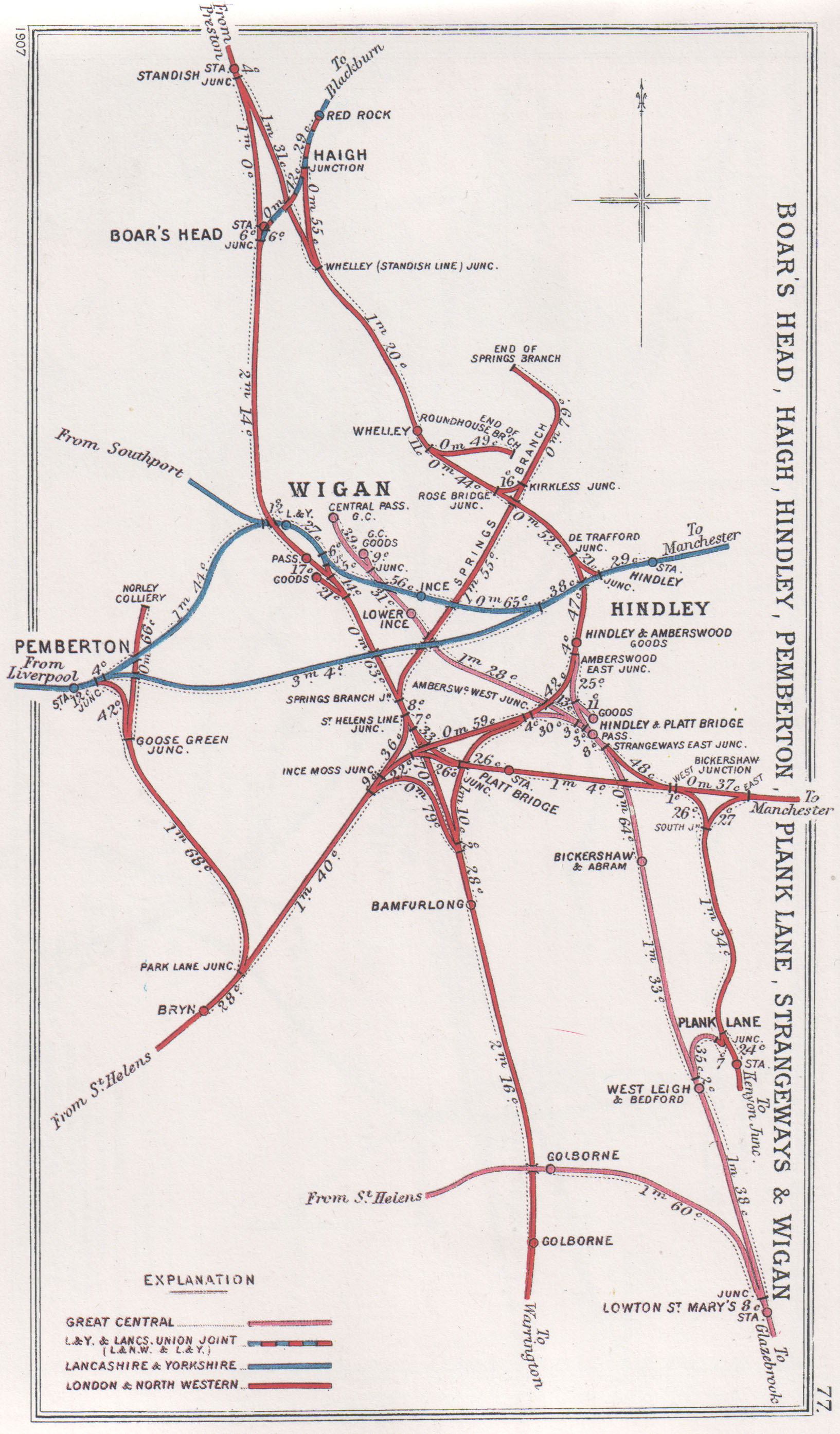
Map showing the location of West Leigh and Bedford station in the early 1900s

The West Leigh and Bedford railway station served the hamlet of Crankwood, the village of Abram, and the Plank Lane area of Leigh, England. Like many railways, the line passed between rather than through communities, with branches off to serve the key driver - goods, and in this area - coal.

== Location and nearby stations ==
The station was on the Wigan Junction Railways line, known locally as the "Wigan Central line", which ran from Wigan Central to Glazebrook. It was situated immediately north of the bridge over Crankwood Lane, which in 2015 was still a minor road.

From 1903 to 1915 the LNWR operated Plank Lane station a short distance to the east on the same country lane but on a different line.

== Services ==
The service patterns in 1895, 1947 and 1962 are fully documented in the authoritative Disused Stations website.

In April 1884 the service pattern was straightforward. Six "Down" (towards Wigan) trains called from Manchester Central. In addition, one "express" called at Glazebrook only and passed West Leigh and Bedford without stopping. Of the six, three called at all stations, the remaining three missed some stations between Manchester and Glazebrook. With the exception of the "express" all trains called at all stations between Glazebrook and Wigan. The "Up" service was similar.

In 1922 six "Down" trains called, All Stations from Manchester Central on "Weekdays" (Mondays to Saturdays), with a further evening train from Lowton St Mary's only. Three other trains called, apparently All Stations from Culcheth, but it is possible they originated from Liverpool Central or Warrington Central and turned west to north at Glazebrook West Junction. One of these trains ran on Fridays and Saturdays Only and the other two ran on Saturdays Only. The "Up" service was broadly similar, but the mix of Saturday Only trains was even more complicated. There was no Sunday service.

The line through West Leigh and Bedford was also a diversionary route and a route by which traffic such as Summer Saturday holiday specials could bypass busy spots, such as Wigan. Pixton, for example, has a fine 1961 shot of a Summer Saturday Sheffield to Blackpool train at Lowton St Mary's which will pass through the station then bear right immediately north of Hindley South onto the Whelley Loop, joining the WCML at Standish, bypassing Wigan altogether.

== Opening, naming and closure ==
The line and station opened in 1884. Initially named "Plank Lane for West Leigh", the station was renamed "West Leigh and Bedford" in Summer 1893. The station closed on 2 November 1964, when the line closed to passengers. The line closed to goods in 1968 and has since been lifted.

== After closure ==
By 2006 the site had been razed to the ground. A lone gatepost remained as a reminder of the station.

Preceding station	Disused railways	Following station
Bickershaw and Abram; Line and station closed	Great Central Railway; Wigan Junction Railways	Lowton St Mary's; Line and station closed
