= Newchurch Halt railway station =

Former railway station in England

Newchurch Halt

General information
- Location: Culcheth, Warrington; England
- Coordinates: 53.4471°N 2.5117°W
- Grid reference: SJ660946
- Platforms: 2

Other information
- Status: Disused

History
- Original company: London and North Eastern Railway
- Post-grouping: London and North Eastern Railway; London Midland Region of British Railways

Key dates
- 1 February 1943: Station opened
- 2 November 1964: Station closed
Location

Newchurch Halt was a railway station on the former Wigan Junction Railways line between Glazebrook and Wigan Central.

== History ==
The station opened on 1 February 1943, to serve nearby military establishments: a Royal Ordnance Factory at Risley, and a Royal Navy training camp. A single-track private railway left the Wigan line just to the East of Newchurch Halt, and ran South, across a staffed level crossing at Silver Lane and eventually into the Royal Ordnance Factory.

The station closed on 2 November 1964, when passenger services were withdrawn from the Wigan line.

Preceding station	Disused railways	Following station
Culcheth; Line and station closed	London and North Eastern Railway; Wigan Junction Railways	Glazebrook; Line closed, station open
Culcheth; Line and station closed	London and North Eastern Railway; Wigan Junction Railways	Padgate; Line closed, station open
