= Grand Arcade (Wigan) =

Shopping mall in Wigan, England

The Grand Arcade

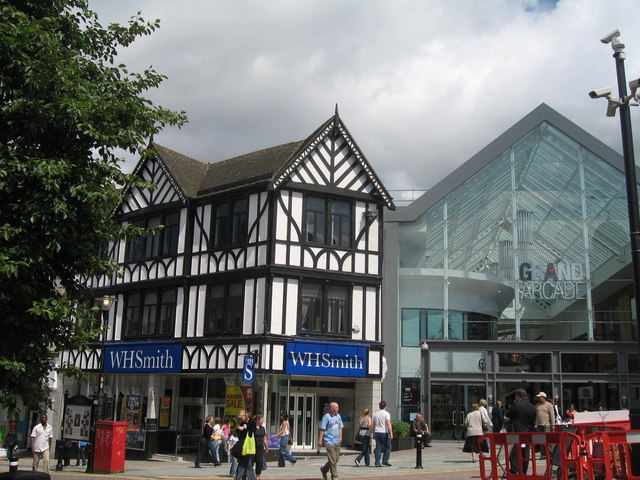
- Grand Arcade Shopping Centre, Wigan Town Centre
- Location: Wigan, Greater Manchester, England
- Coordinates: 53°32′51″N 2°37′45″W
- Opened: March 2007; 19 years ago
- Developer: Modus
- Owner: Wigan Retail Ltd and Landswood de Coy
- Num. of stores: over 40
- Floor area: 439,000 sq ft (40,780 m^{2})
- Floors: 2
- Parking: Milgate Street 600 spaces, Crompton Street 250 spaces
- Website: Official website

The Grand Arcade is a shopping centre in the town centre of Wigan, England. Built in 2007, it comprises over 40 retailers and has a total annual footfall of 3.2 million. It currently extends to 439,000 sq ft (40,800 m^{2}), with units varying in size. The centre is owned and operated by Wigan Retail Ltd and Landswood de Coy LLP, a property investment business. When built, it was the UK's first carbon-neutral shopping centre and therefore produces net-zero carbon dioxide emissions. The Grand Arcade houses a bronze statue of George Formby designed by Manx artist Amanda Barton, which was unveiled in 2007.

== History ==
Construction of the shopping centre began in 2005 at a cost of £120 million. It was built on the former site of The Ritz, an Art Moderne cinema open from 1968-1997, Wigan Central railway station and Wigan Casino, a nightclub which operated between 1973 and 1981 and was known widely for its northern soul music. An exhibition space in the Grand Arcade holds some memorabilia and photographs of the Casino. Before construction began on the site, evidence was found by Oxford Archaeology North that it was a significant Roman site in Wigan during the late first and second centuries AD. These excavations revealed numerous artefacts, including a hearth, pottery pieces, and tiles. One significant discovery was a hypocaust, which was used as a heating system in a Roman bathhouse. The hypocaust was restored and relocated to Concert Square, a communal area within Grand Arcade.

After the 2008 financial crisis, Modus, the original developer of the Grand Arcade, shelved plans for a mixed-use 190-foot-tall (58 m) apartment block called Tower Grand which would have been built on the site adjoining the centre. As of 2020, the land for the planned apartment block remains unused and empty. The proposals were later scrapped after Modus went into administration in 2009.

In the 2010s, its annual footfall was 6.2 million. By 2025, this had reduced to 3.2 million, which was also third down from the number before the Covid pandemic. It was formerly owned and operated by RDI REIT, but was put up for sale in 2019. As of 2026, the centre remains primarily retail-focused, although it is gradually incorporating more leisure uses, with two former anchor stores currently being redeveloped.

== Retail and entertainment ==
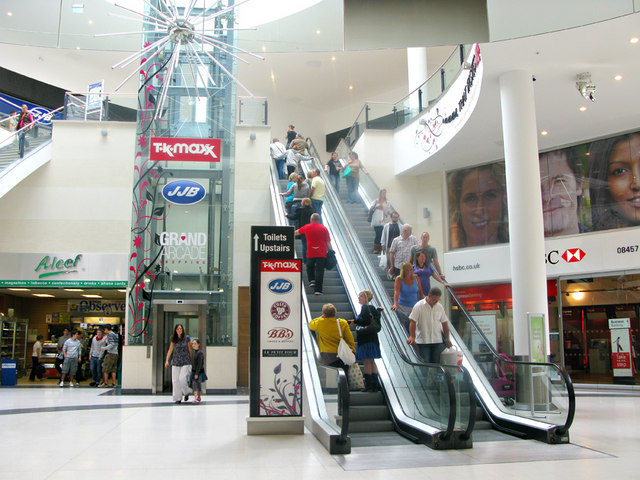
Inside the Grand Arcade

The centre has several high street brands such as Boots, Waterstones and Poundland. It also holds The Casino Café which is themed on the historical Wigan Casino Social Club. In 2015 Clarks and New Look relocated their stores in Wigan to The Grand Arcade from The Galleries where they were previously based. All four original anchor stores have closed: BHS in 2016 when it went into administration, TK Maxx in 2017 (relocating to Robin Retail Park), Marks & Spencer (also relocating to Robin Park), and Debenhams in 2021 after its administration, leaving the Grand Arcade without an anchor store for the first time since 2007.

As of 2026, the former Debenhams department store is currently undergoing redevelopment into a STACK leisure destination. The completed venue will be 48,000 square feet across three floors and will feature live entertainment, a variety of independent shops, 12 street-food vendors, and six bars. As well, the 45,000 sq ft former Marks & Spencer is undergoing redevelopment as a science and discovery hub called Imagine That! for children 10 and younger.

== Transport ==
The shopping centre is bounded by Standishgate, Crompton Street, Millgate and Riverway. Some shops have two entrances - one to the internal mall and one onto the high street. It has two multi-storey carparks on Milgate and Crompton Street with over 850 spaces combined. Bus access is available at the nearby Wigan bus station. Two railway stations serve Wigan town centre, Wigan Wallgate and Wigan North Western.
