= Culcheth Linear Park =

Park in Warrington, England

Coordinates: 53.4501°N 2.5305°W

Culcheth Linear Park is a park in the district of Culcheth, Warrington, England.

Like the Black Bear Park and sections of the Trans Pennine Trail, Culcheth Linear Park is built on former railway tracks. This park lies on a section of the former Wigan Junction Railways.

The line was first opened to goods in 1878 and was later connected to Wigan Central, Glazebrook, Lowton St Mary's, and Culcheth. At the outbreak of World War II, lines were connected to the Royal Naval Aircraft Training Establishment at Culcheth (HMS Ariel) and the Royal Ordnance Factory at Risley. Following the Beeching Report of 1964, the line was closed.

On 21 December 1970, part of the former rail route was conveyed to Golborne Urban District Council. In 1974, Golborne UDC was split between two newly created local authorities: the Borough of Warrington and the Metropolitan Borough of Wigan. The portion of the rail route that was acquired by Warrington was converted into a new park. Today it is home to many local community projects and a variety of wildlife. There are also some limited facilities for sport.

In February 2023, the park garnered worldwide attention as the location of the murder of teenager Brianna Ghey.
