= Wigan Darlington Street railway station =

Former railway station in Greater Manchester, England

Wigan Darlington Street

General information
- Location: Wigan, Metropolitan Borough of Wigan, England
- Coordinates: 53.5432°N 2.6281°W
- Grid reference: SJ585045
- Platforms: 2

Other information
- Status: Disused

History
- Original company: Wigan Junction Railways
- Pre-grouping: Great Central Railway

Key dates
- 1 April 1884: Station opened
- 3 October 1892: Station closed to passengers on opening of Wigan Central
Location

Wigan Darlington Street was one of three railway stations between 1884 and 1892 to serve the town of Wigan, in Lancashire (now in Greater Manchester), England. It was located some way east of the two main stations, North Western and Wallgate, which lie on the western edge of the town centre. It was closed to passengers, once the more-permanent Central station was opened.

== History ==
The station was opened on 1 April 1884, as the temporary terminus of the Wigan Junction Railways (WJR) line from Glazebrook West Junction. The WJR was part of the Manchester, Sheffield and Lincolnshire Railway, which later became the Great Central.

It was not well sited. A 900-yard-long (800 m) extension was built to the new permanent terminus,Wigan Central, which was completed in 1892; it was around 500 yards (460 m) nearer to the town centre. Upon Central station's opening, Darlington Street was closed to passengers and became a goods depot.

== Services ==
In April 1884, the weekday service pattern was straightforward; there were seven down trains from Manchester Central; of which:

- one express, which called at Glazebrook only
- three missed some stations between Manchester and Glazebrook
- three called at all stations on the line.

With the exception of the express service, trains called at all stations between Glazebrook and Wigan.

The up service pattern to Manchester was similar.

Preceding station	Disused railways	Following station
Terminus	Great Central Railway; Wigan Junction Railways	Lower Ince; Line and station closed

== See also ==
- List of closed railway stations in Britain
- Liverpool, St Helens & South Lancashire Railway
- Old railway lines in Wigan
