= Lower Ince railway station =

Former railway station in England

Lower Ince
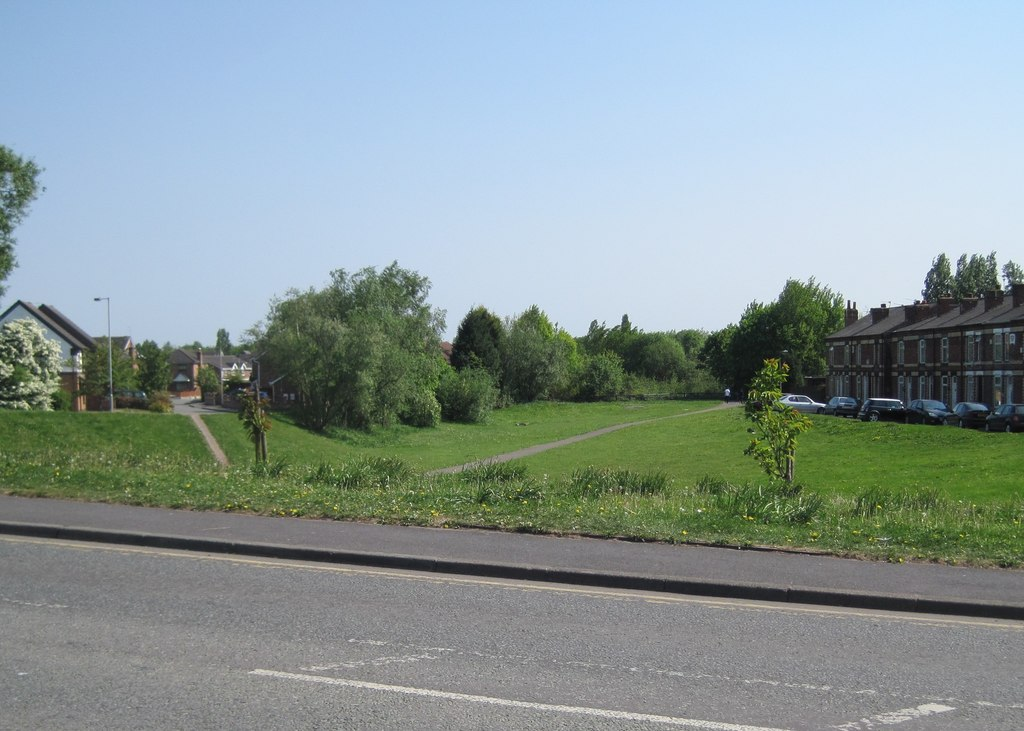
- The site of the station in 2011

General information
- Location: Wigan, Wigan; England
- Coordinates: 53.5376°N 2.6145°W
- Grid reference: SD59370473
- Platforms: 2

Other information
- Status: Disused

History
- Original company: Wigan Junction Railways
- Pre-grouping: Great Central Railway
- Post-grouping: London and North Eastern Railway

Key dates
- 1 April 1884: Station opened
- 2 November 1964: Station closed completely
Location

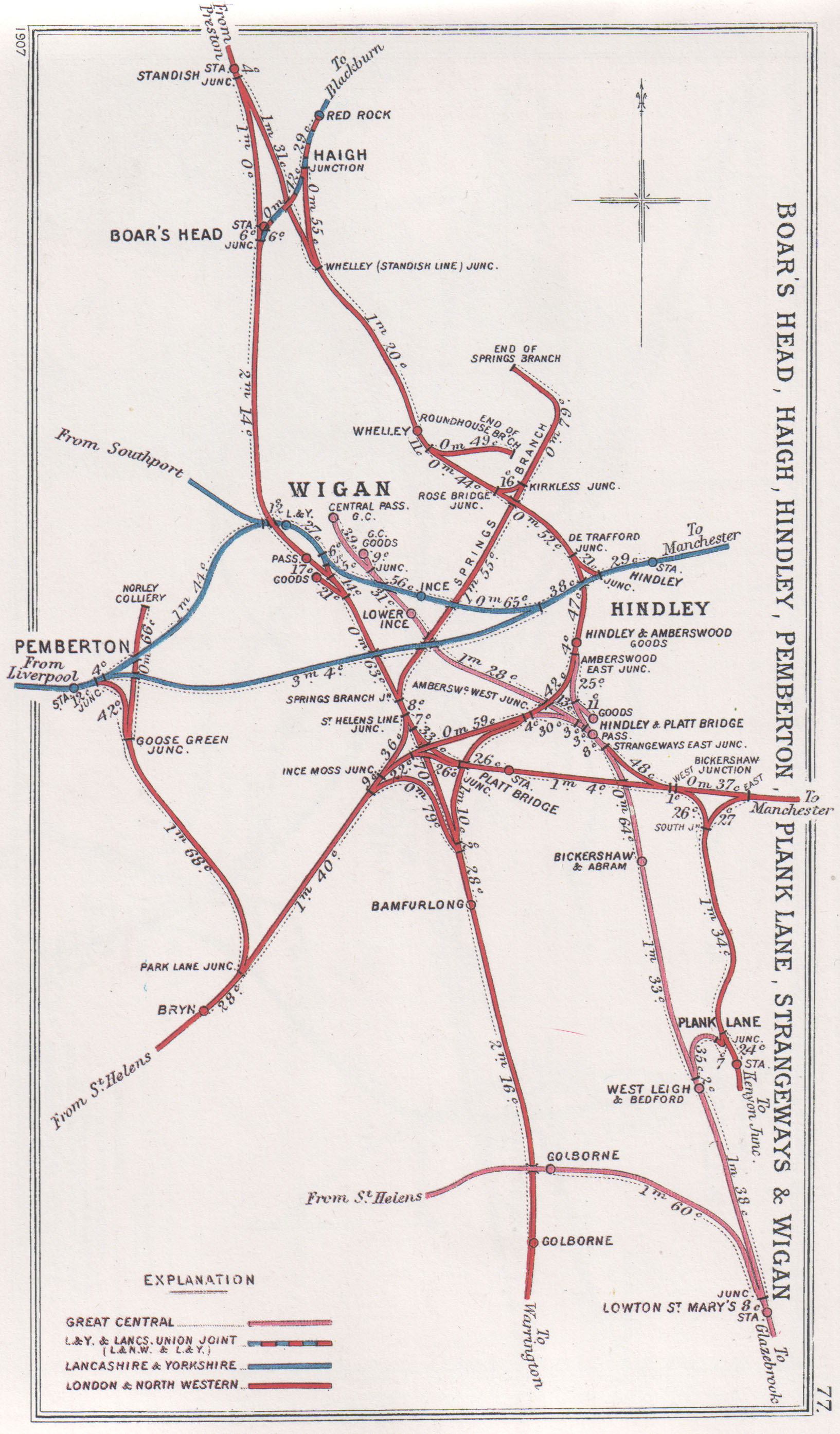
Lines around Wigan in 1907

Lower Ince railway station was a railway station in southern Wigan, Lancashire, England.

== Location and construction ==
Lower Ince station was in a cutting on the south side of Ince Green Lane, a short distance from the LYR's rival station, Ince.

The station was on the Wigan Junction Railways (WJR) line from Glazebrook West Junction to Wigan. The WJR was part of the Manchester, Sheffield and Lincolnshire Railway (later to become the Great Central) and opened on 1 April 1884, with other stations along the line.

Lower Ince Engine Shed stood north west of the station. It closed on 26 March 1952.

== Services ==
The service patterns in 1895, 1947 and 1962 are fully documented in the authoritative Disused Stations website.

In April 1884 the service pattern was straightforward. Six "Down" (towards Wigan) trains called from Manchester Central. In addition, one "express" called at Glazebrook only and passed Lower Ince without stopping. Of the six, three called at all stations, the remaining three missed some stations between Manchester and Glazebrook. With the exception of the "express" all trains called at all stations between Glazebrook and Wigan. The "Up" service was similar.

In 1922 six "Down" trains called, All Stations from Manchester Central on "Weekdays" (Mondays to Saturdays), with a further evening train from Lowton St Mary's only. Three other trains called, apparently All Stations from Culcheth, but it is possible they originated from Liverpool Central or Warrington Central and turned west to north at Glazebrook West Junction. One of these trains ran on Fridays and Saturdays Only and the other two ran on Saturdays Only. The "Up" service was broadly similar, but the mix of Saturday Only trains was even more complicated. There was no Sunday service.

== Closure and after ==
According to Beeching's Reshaping of British Railways the line was more heavily used than many which did not close, however, as with many unmodernised and heavily used commuter lines it was deemed uneconomic. The line's main passenger traffic was workers travelling from the Wigan area to industrial plants in Cadishead and Partington and around the docks in Salford and Manchester; until the late 1970s the Lancashire United bus company operated a replacement bus service from Wigan to Partington.

The station closed completely on 2 November 1964 and has been demolished.

| Preceding station | Disused railways | Following station |
|---|---|---|
| Wigan Darlington Street; Line and station closed | Great Central Railway; Wigan Junction Railways | Hindley South; Line and station closed |
| Wigan Central; Line and station closed | Great Central Railway; Wigan Junction Railways | Hindley South; Line and station closed |

== See also ==
- List of closed railway stations in Britain
- Wigan North Western railway station
- Wigan Wallgate railway station
- Liverpool, St Helens & South Lancashire Railway
- Old railway lines in Wigan
