= Bickershaw and Abram railway station =

Disused railway station in Bickershaw, Wigan

Bickershaw and Abram
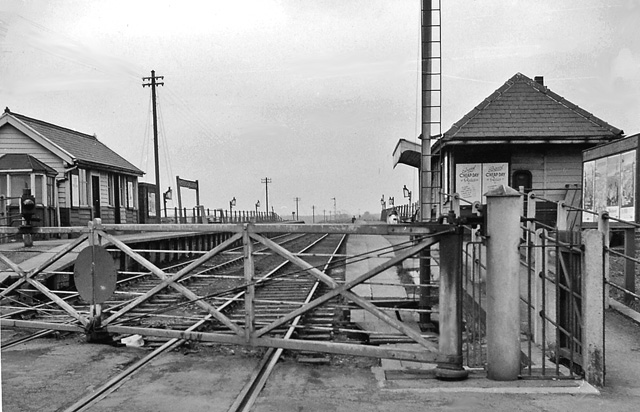

General information
- Location: Bickershaw, Wigan; England
- Coordinates: 53.5149°N 2.5781°W
- Grid reference: SD618022
- Platforms: 2

Other information
- Status: Disused

History
- Original company: Wigan Junction Railways
- Pre-grouping: Great Central Railway
- Post-grouping: London and North Eastern Railway

Key dates
- 1 April 1884: Station opened
- 2 November 1964: Station closed
Location

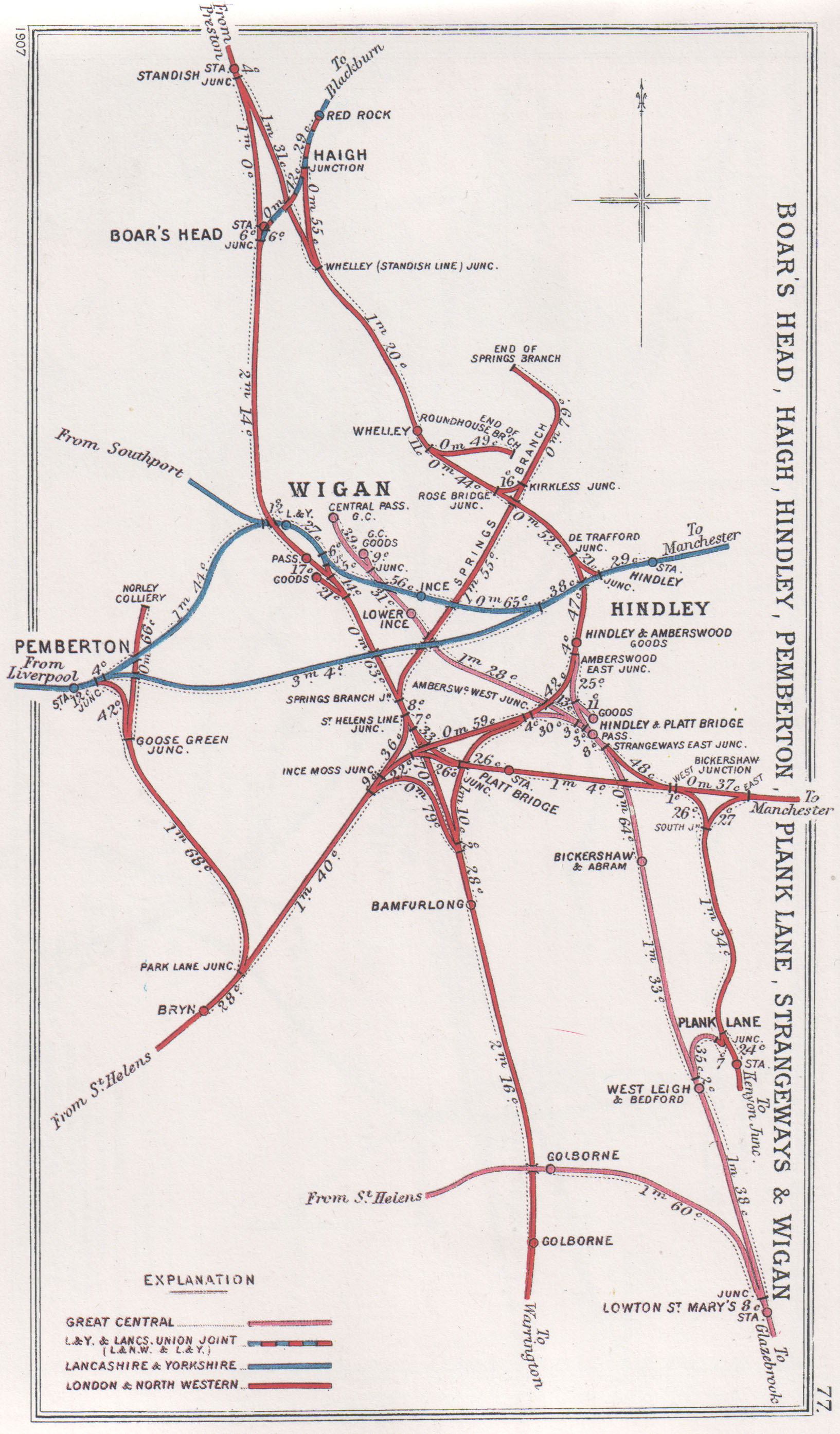
Map showing the location of Bickershaw and Abram station in the early 1900s

Bickershaw and Abram railway station served the communities of Bickershaw and Abram southeast of Wigan, England.

== Location and nearby stations ==
The station was on the Wigan Junction Railways line, known locally as the "Wigan Central line", which ran from Wigan Central to Glazebrook. It was situated immediately south of the B5237 level crossing over the tracks.

== Services ==
The service patterns in 1895, 1947 and 1962 are fully documented in the authoritative Disused Stations website.

In April 1884 the service pattern was straightforward. Six "Down" (towards Wigan) trains called from Manchester Central. In addition, one "express" called at Glazebrook only and passed Lower Ince without stopping. Of the six, three called at all stations, the remaining three missed some stations between Manchester and Glazebrook. With the exception of the "express" all trains called at all stations between Glazebrook and Wigan. The "Up" service was similar.

In 1922 six "Down" trains called, All Stations from Manchester Central on "Weekdays" (Mondays to Saturdays), with a further evening train from Lowton St Mary's only. Three other trains called, apparently All Stations from Culcheth, but it is possible they originated from Liverpool Central or Warrington Central and turned west to north at Glazebrook West Junction. One of these trains ran on Fridays and Saturdays Only and the other two ran on Saturdays Only. The "Up" service was broadly similar, but the mix of Saturday Only trains was even more complicated. There was no Sunday service.

The line through Bickershaw and Abram was also a diversionary route and a route by which traffic such as Summer Saturday holiday specials could bi-pass busy spots, such as Wigan. Pixton, for example, has a fine 1961 shot of a Summer Saturday Sheffield to Blackpool train at Lowton St Mary's which will pass through the station then bear right immediately north of Hindley South onto the Whelley Loop, joining the WCML at Standish, bypassing Wigan altogether.

== Opening, naming and closure ==
The line and station opened in 1884. The station closed on 2 November 1964, when the line closed to passengers. The line closed to goods in 1968 and has since been lifted.

== After closure ==
By 2006 the site had been razed to the ground. A lone gatepost remained as a reminder of the station.

Preceding station	Disused railways	Following station
Hindley South; Line and station closed	Great Central Railway; Wigan Junction Railways	West Leigh and Bedford; Line and station closed
