= Culcheth Methodist Church =

Church in Warrington, England

Coordinates: 53°27′15.3″N 2°31′15.9″W

Culcheth Methodist Church is in the village of Culcheth, Warrington, England, at the corner of Ellesmere Road and Burton Close, a short walk from the village green.

== Foundation ==
The church was founded in the 1950s as a home worship group in the rapidly expanding village as the village became a residence area to workers in the newly established Atomic Energy industry at Risley by Methodists from the nearby village of Glazebury, where a much older Methodist Church was and is based on the Warrington Road, Glazebury. Now the church has expanded to be the largest Methodist church in the local area. The church is part of the Leigh and Hindley Circuit, which is currently (circa late 2009~2015) under review and change.

== Independent charity ==
In 2009, the church became an independent charity, registered with the Charity Commission of England and Wales. Previously, the church was a charity under the statutory regulations giving charitable status to all Methodist Churches.

== Delta shape, Δ, and bell ==
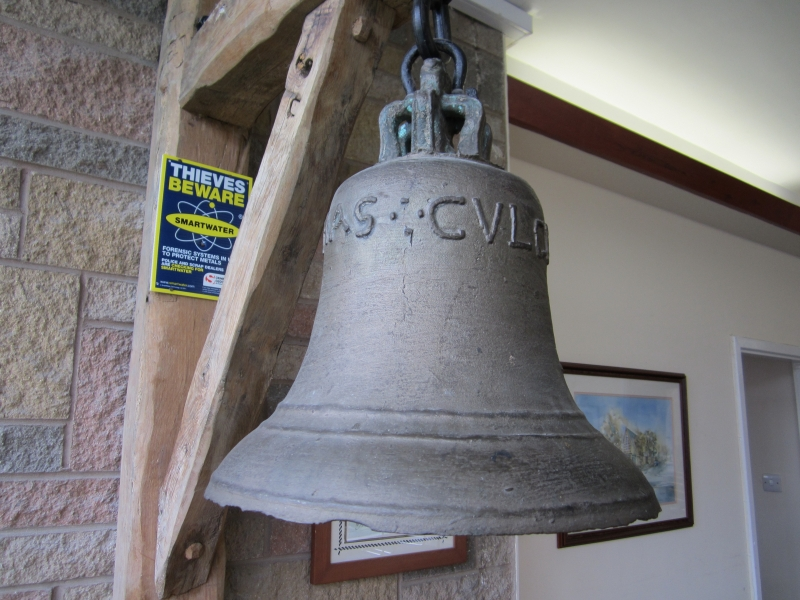
Culcheth Hall Bell

The church sanctuary is somewhat exceptional in being of a triangular shape ("Δ") much like the sweets called "Toblerone" and being the first modern church since the English reformation in Culcheth. The older village area under its squire was recusant, and thus the Church of England church serving the village was outside the village at Newchurch. The local Roman Catholic church is also outside the village. Culcheth Methodist Church is now home to the old bell from Culcheth Hall chapel, the squire's private Catholic chapel, which has passed through the other churches to Culcheth Methodist Church for safekeeping, and is in regular use as it is rung to announce services and continuation of worship in many forms in the village.

For safety and proof of theft, all metal and equipment within the church is marked with "Smartwater" for forensic tracing. [Edit 20200906] The bell is no longer hung in the church, but has disappeared in the refurbishment to enlarge the foyer, and the inability of Methodist Organisation to accept risk of it falling or hurting someone if they bumped into it.

== See also ==
- Methodist Church of Great Britain
