= Brightbay Real Estate Partners =

British property investment company

- Type: Private company
- Traded as: Formerly: LSE: RDI; JSE: RPL
- Industry: Property investment
- Founded: 2002; 24 years ago
- Headquarters: Douglas, Isle of Man, United Kingdom
- Key people: Stephen Oakenfull (CEO)
- Products: Property investment
- Revenue: £102.1 million (2017)
- Operating income: £94.9 million (2017)
- Net income: £69.6 million (2017)
- Website: rdireit.com

Brightbay Real Estate Partners is a British property investment business. It was acquired by Starwood Capital Group in 2021, and remains a fully integrated Real Estate Investment Trust (REIT).

== History ==
The company was established in 2002 as the Corovest International Real Estate Fund. It was floated on the Alternative Investment Market in 2006. It changed its name to Redefine International in 2008 and converted to a Real estate investment trust listed on the London Stock Exchange in 2013. It changed its name again, to RDI REIT, in November 2017.

Until 2021, it was listed on the London Stock Exchange as RDI REIT PLC, ticker symbol RDI. In May 2021, Starwood Capital Group acquired RDI REIT plc for £467.9M and it was reformed into Brightbay Real Estate Partners.

== Operations ==
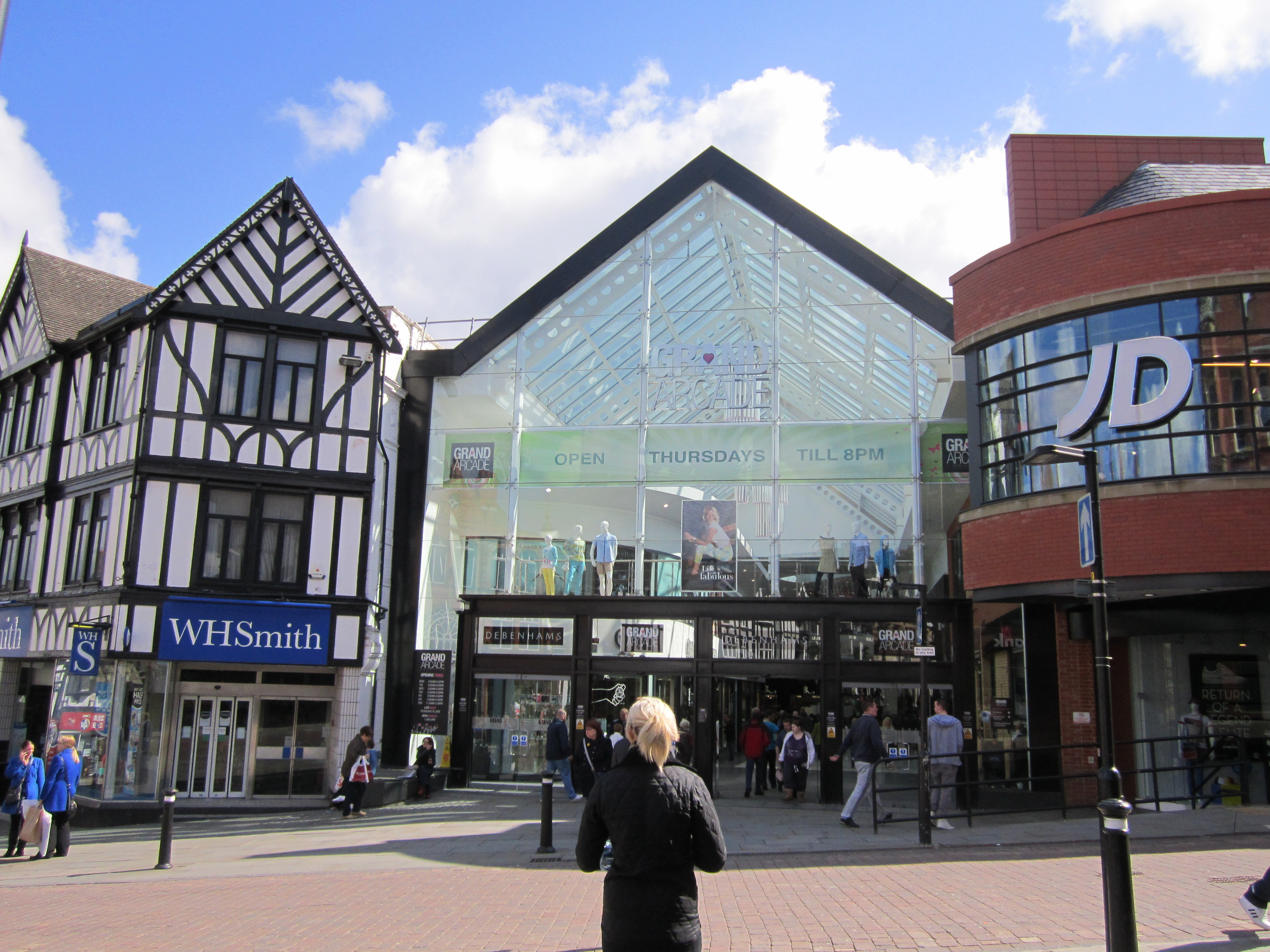
Entrance to Grand Arcade shopping centre, Wigan

The company's largest investments include the Grand Arcade in Wigan, St George's Shopping Centre in Harrow and West Orchards Shopping Centre in Coventry. The company had a portfolio valued at £1.5bn as at 31 August 2017.
