= Wigan bus station =

Bus station in Greater Manchester, England

Wigan
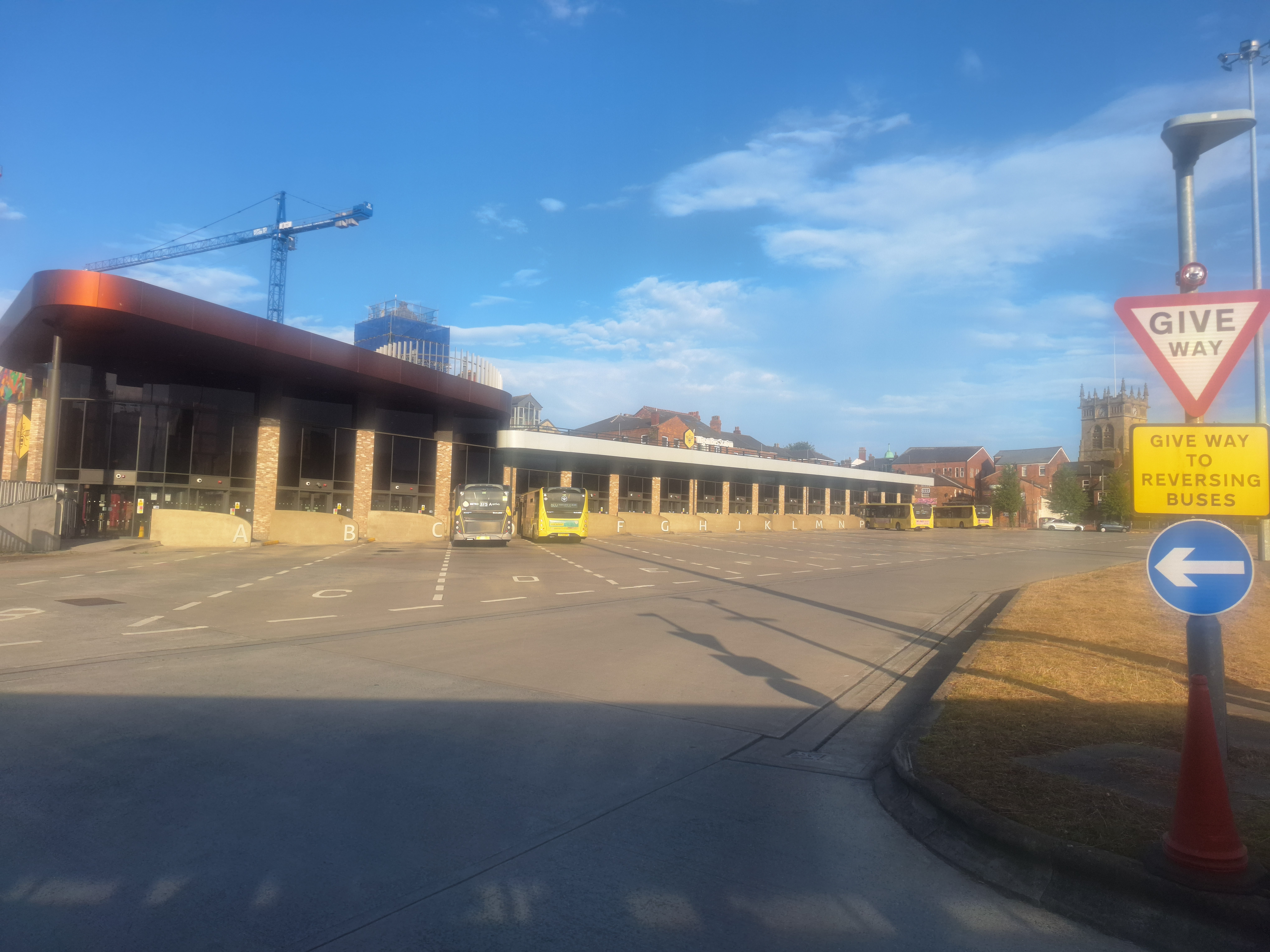
- The redeveloped bus station

General information
- Location: Hallgate, Wigan, Metropolitan Borough of Wigan, England
- Coordinates: 53°32′48″N 2°38′02″W
- Operator: Transport for Greater Manchester
- Bus routes: 22A 110 132 320 352 360 375 385 575 601 602 603 604 605 606 607 608 609 610 611 613 615 629 630 631 632 633 634 635 639 640 641 667
- Bus stands: 19 (A-U excluding I, O)
- Bus operators: Go North West; Diamond Bus North West; Stagecoach Manchester; Vision Bus; Arriva Merseyside; Holmeswood Coaches; Warrington's Own Buses
- Connections: Wigan North Western, Wigan Wallgate

Construction
- Cycle facilities: Yes
- Accessible: Yes

Other information
- Website: TFGM Wigan bus station

History
- Opened: 29 November 1987
- Closed: 30 July 2017
- Rebuilt: 28 October 2018
Location

Wigan bus station serves the town of Wigan, in Greater Manchester, England. It is operated by Transport for Greater Manchester.

== History ==
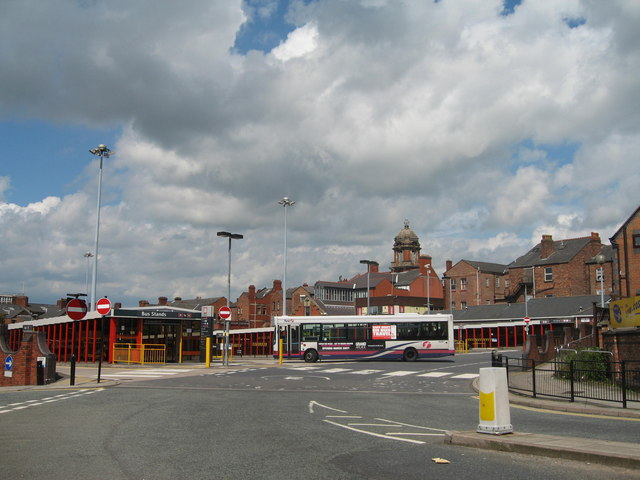
The bus station, as it was before its 2017-18 redevelopment

Wigan's original bus station was on Market Square. It was demolished in 1985, as part of a wider redevelopment of the town centre, to make way for the Galleries Shopping Centre. Construction on a new bus station, built at a cost of £2.3 million, began in April 1986 and was opened in November 1987. The new station was built on the site of the Queen’s Hall, most of which was demolished to accommodate it.

The facility has 19 stands (Note: Bus stands are lettered A to U, excluding I and O.) and can handle up to 72 services. At its opening, it was praised for its accessibility features, including ramps and tactile paving. The bus station was opened officially in 1988 by the Mayor of Wigan, who unveiled a commemorative plaque. CCTV cameras were installed in 1996 to deter crime, and the station's facilities were further improved in 2001 with a £150,000 upgrade.

== Location ==
The bus station is located opposite the site of the former Galleries shopping centre; (Note: From November 2022, Galleries was demolished and the site is being redeveloped.) it is well connected to the town centre with pedestrian and bicycle routes. It is around 400 yards away from Wigan North Western and Wigan Wallgate railway stations.

== Redevelopment ==
In July 2017, the bus station closed for redevelopment with the stands relocated temporarily around the town centre. The old bus stands were demolished and a new station was built on the same site, the project cost £15.7 million supported by the UK Government through the Greater Manchester Local Growth Deal programme.

It reopened in October 2018, two months ahead of schedule. The new station added a new covered waiting area for better passenger comfort and security, with increased retail space, new toilets and covered bicycle parking. The development also has eco-friendly initiatives, such as solar panels and the planting of wildflowers. Accessibility was also improved for people with physical disabilities, for the blind and partially sighted.

== Services ==
The majority of services are operated by Go North West, Diamond Bus North West, Vision Bus and Stagecoach Manchester, under franchise to the Bee Network; others are Arriva Merseyside, Holmeswood Coaches and Warrington's Own Buses.

Routes connect the town with Bolton, Chorley, Ormskirk, Preston, St Helens, Skelmersdale, Southport, the Trafford Centre and Warrington. Local routes run to Appley Bridge, Ashton-in-Makerfield, Golborne, Hindley, Leigh, Pemberton, Shevington and Standish.
