= The Galleries (Wigan) =

Shopping complex in Wigan town centre, England

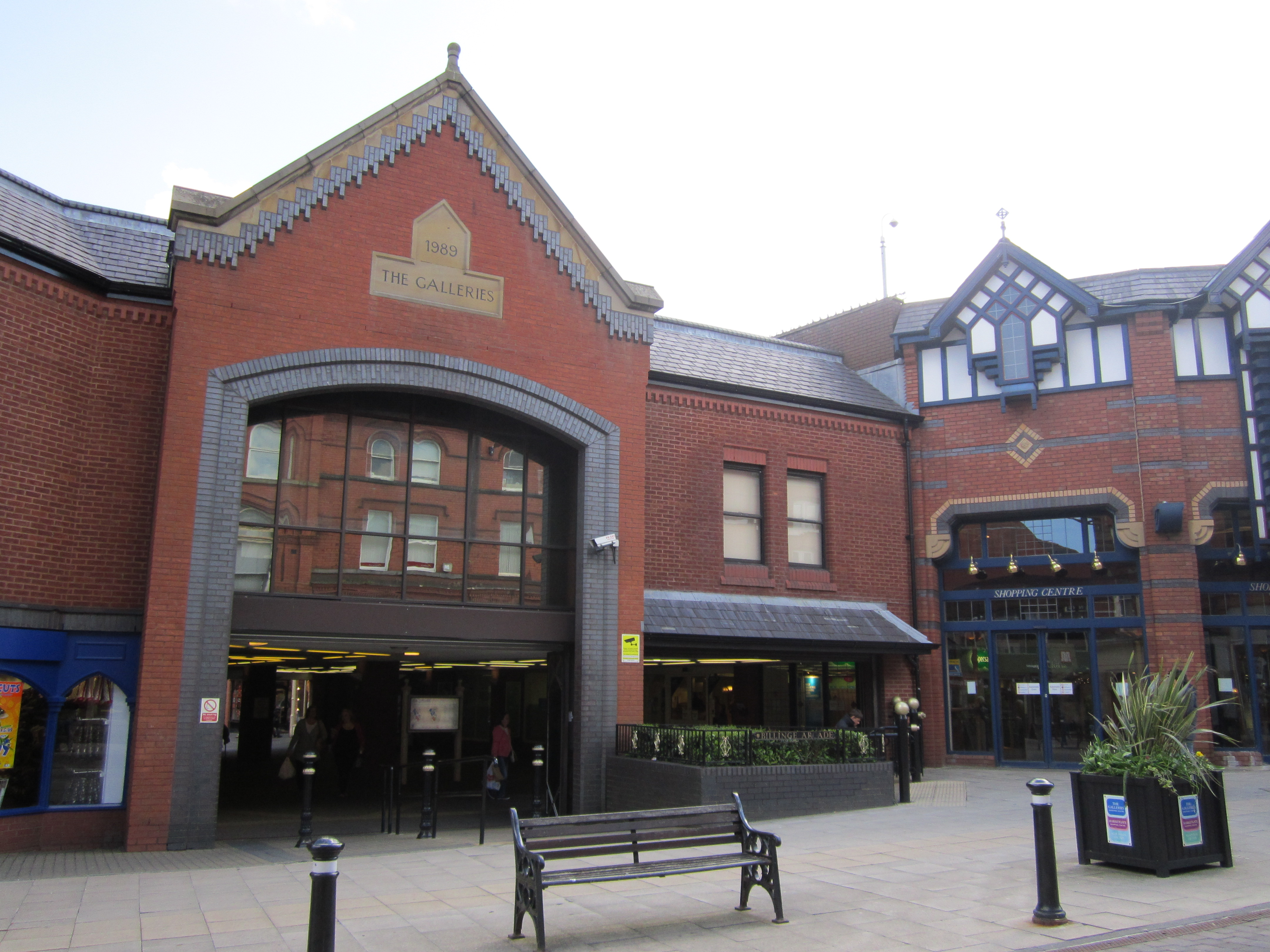
- Entrance to The Galleries shopping centre, Wigan
- Location: Wigan, UK
- Coordinates: 53°32′51″N 2°37′57″W
- Opened: 1890, 1972, 1991
- Closed: 2022
- Manager: CBRE Group
- Owner: Wigan Council
- Num. of stores: over 50 (in 2020)
- Floor area: 438,540 sq ft (40,740 m^{2})
- Floors: 2
- Parking: 625 spaces
- Website: Official website

The Galleries was a shopping complex in the town centre of Wigan, Greater Manchester, owned by Wigan Council. It consisted of three sections: The Galleries Shopping Centre, Marketgate Shopping Centre and The Makinson Arcade. The eight-acre complex featured a combination of enclosed malls, walkways and open squares and accounted for almost a quarter of the town centre's footprint. The retail space within the complex totalled approximately 440,000 square feet (41,000 m^{2}).

== History ==
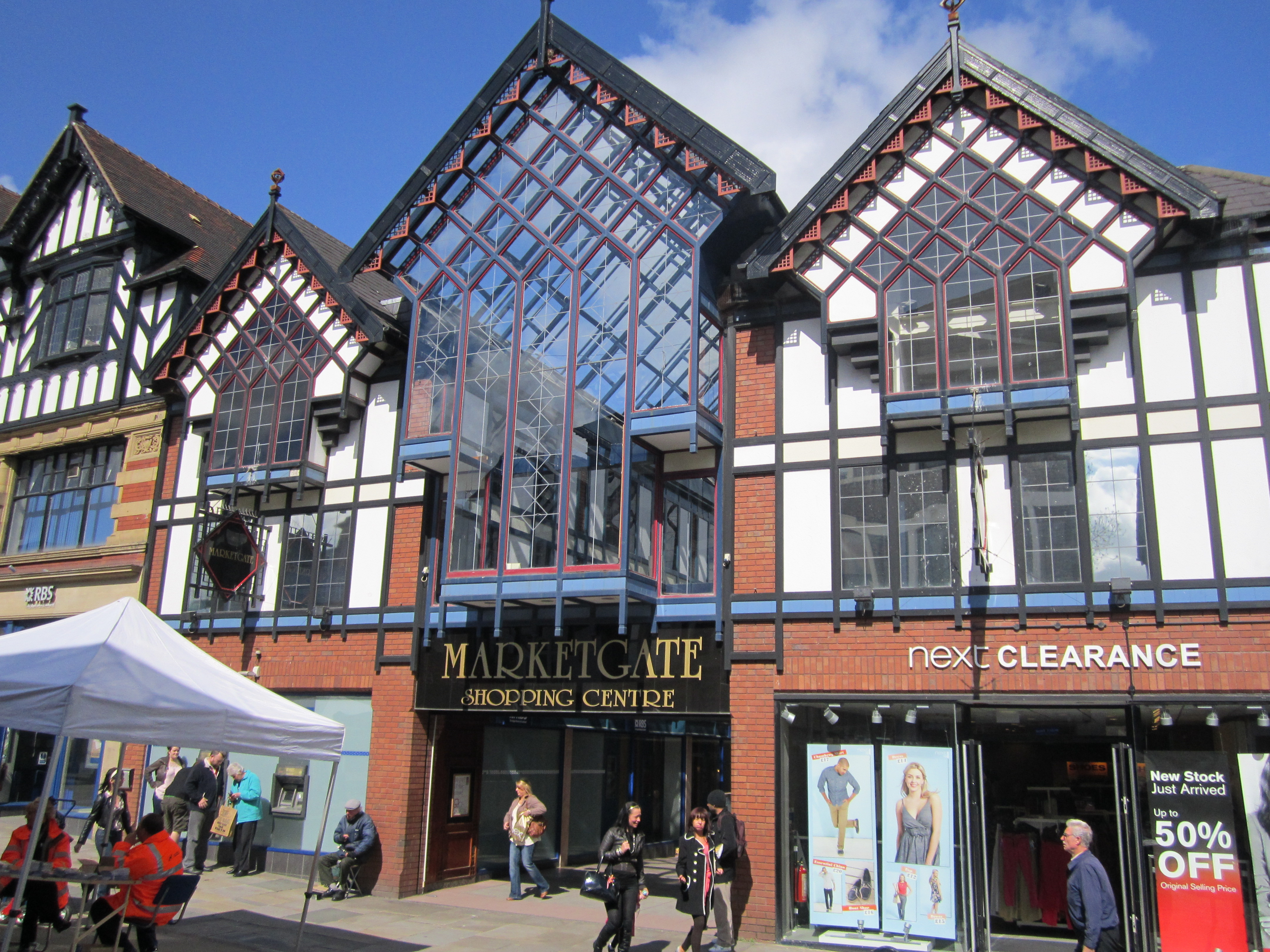
Entrance to the Marketgate Shopping Centre (closed off in 2016)

The Marketgate Shopping Centre, originally named The Wigan Centre Arcade, was built in 1972 on former commercial yards and markets. It opened in 1974 and underwent radical remodelling in 1988 when the adjoining Galleries Shopping Centre was constructed. The Galleries, consisting of 60 retail spaces, was completed in 1990 and opened by Princess Diana in 1991. The many arcades and walks in the Galleries were named after the former local authorities, which now make up the Wigan Metropolitan Borough. In 1996, Wigan Council sold the Galleries to the private sector for over £90 million.

The two centres, though connected, operated independently until 2002, when they were jointly acquired by Prime Commercial Properties. In 2006, they were sold to Propinvest Limited, who also acquired the neighbouring Victorian-era Makinson Arcade. Constructed in 1898, it is a traditional glazed shopping arcade faced in terracotta and was the site of one of the first Marks and Spencer's penny bazaars which opened in 1900. In October 2015, Colony Capital purchased the entire complex, including the Makinson Arcade, as part of a portfolio transaction, and commissioned the Ellandi retail group to manage the centre.

Due to "years of stagnation and decline", Wigan Council brought the complex back under public ownership in March 2018. They purchased the site for £8 million, using money from its Manchester Airport dividend. This was part of the Council's The Deal program, which aims to revitalise the town centre. In 2019, The Fire Within Festival was held on the top floors of the Galleries in six vacant retail spaces. The festival, which was directed by the local artists AL and AL, featured art, performances and exhibitions.

Plans were drawn up in November 2021 to demolish the centre. In 2022, the centre was closed off to the public and demolition work commenced in November of the same year.

== Decline ==
Following the opening of the Grand Arcade shopping centre in 2007, located less than 100 yards away, several retailers from The Galleries, such as Boots and River Island, relocated. In 2016, Argos and Morrisons announced the closure of their shops in the complex, dealing a significant blow. As a result of low unit rentals, a large portion of the Marketgate Shopping Centre was closed off to the public in late 2016. By 2020, the majority of the 144 retail units in the complex were vacant, with only around 50 in use. The Council's concerns about continued decline and the potential for closure and a mothballed site led to their purchase of the complex in 2018. Eventually, The Galleries closed down in 2022.

== Future ==
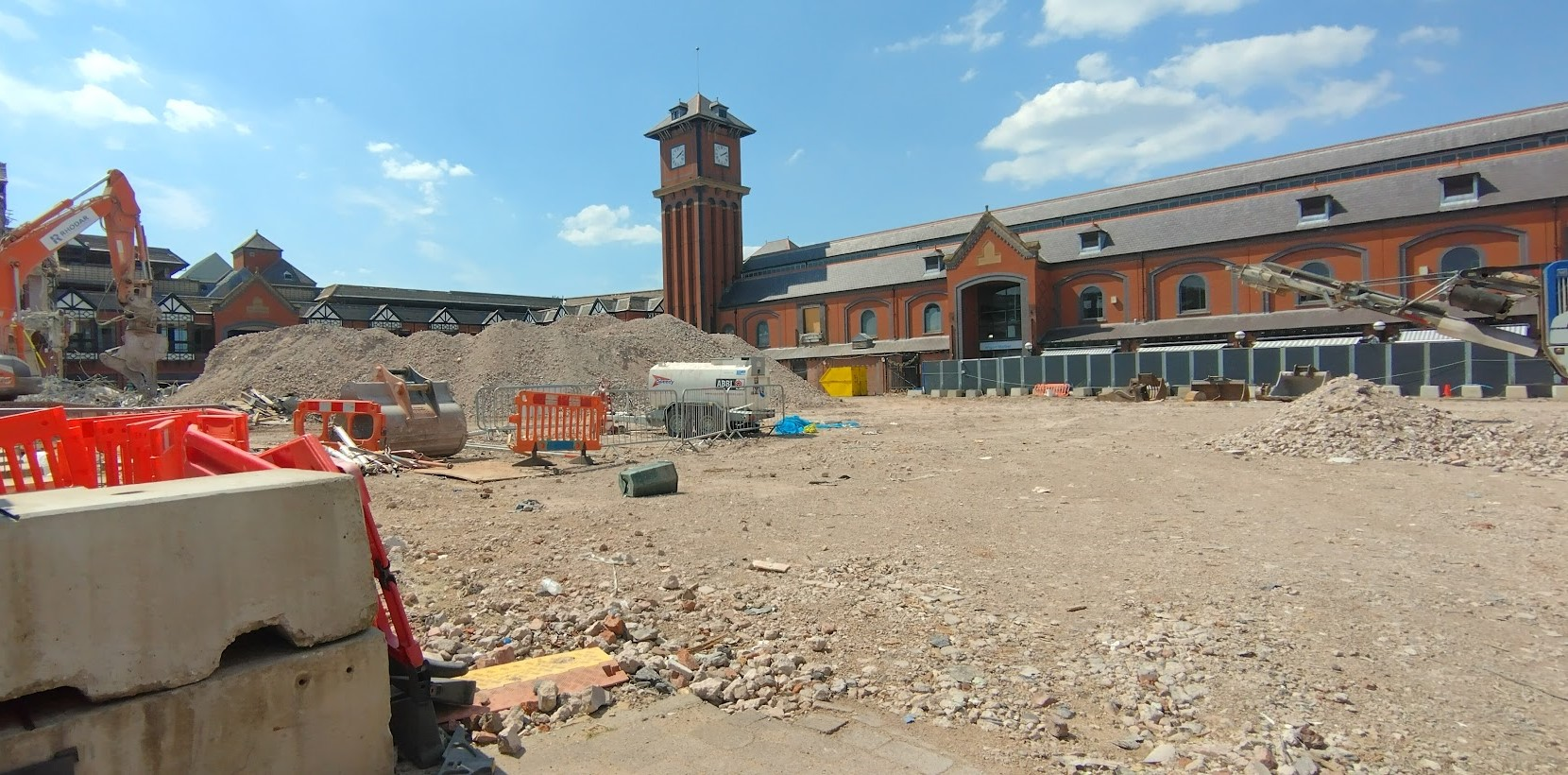
The Galleries in 2023, under demolition

In 2014 outline planning approval was granted for a £60 million redevelopment of the area into the 'Makinson Quarter' including the creation of a new shopping mall of 26 larger retail spaces. However, after Wigan Council purchased the complex in 2018, this proposal was scrapped. The Council initially intended to retain the site but also produce a long-term plan to revitalise it with new leisure, food and drink facilities, and residential developments.

In 2020, the Council launched a formal procurement process to find a partner for a £125 million redevelopment of the 8-acre (3.2 ha) complex. The redevelopment project was expected to take seven years. As of 2023, the redevelopment of the site is underway and expected to cost £135 million. The plans include a Multi-media Centre, with a multiplex cinema, bowling alley and an indoor climbing wall. This is in addition to the construction of 483 homes, a 144-bedroom hotel and a new Wigan Market hall as part of a multi-phase project. The Makinson Arcade will be retained and remains open. In 2025, the regeneration project for the former Galleries site was renamed Fettlers. The name derives from the term 'fettler', referring to a craft worker who shaped metal and pottery – industries that were once central to the local economy.

== Gallery ==
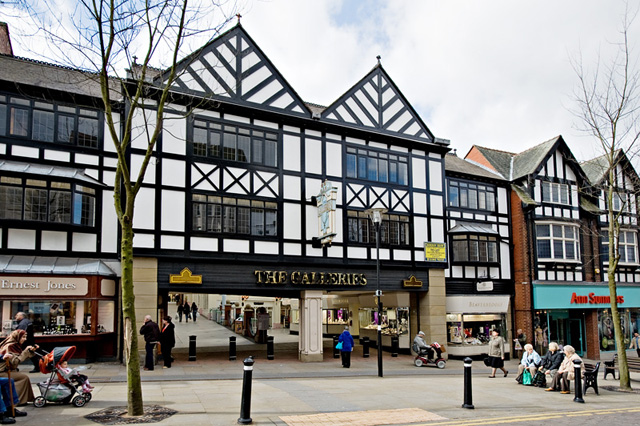
The entrance to the Galleries on Market Place

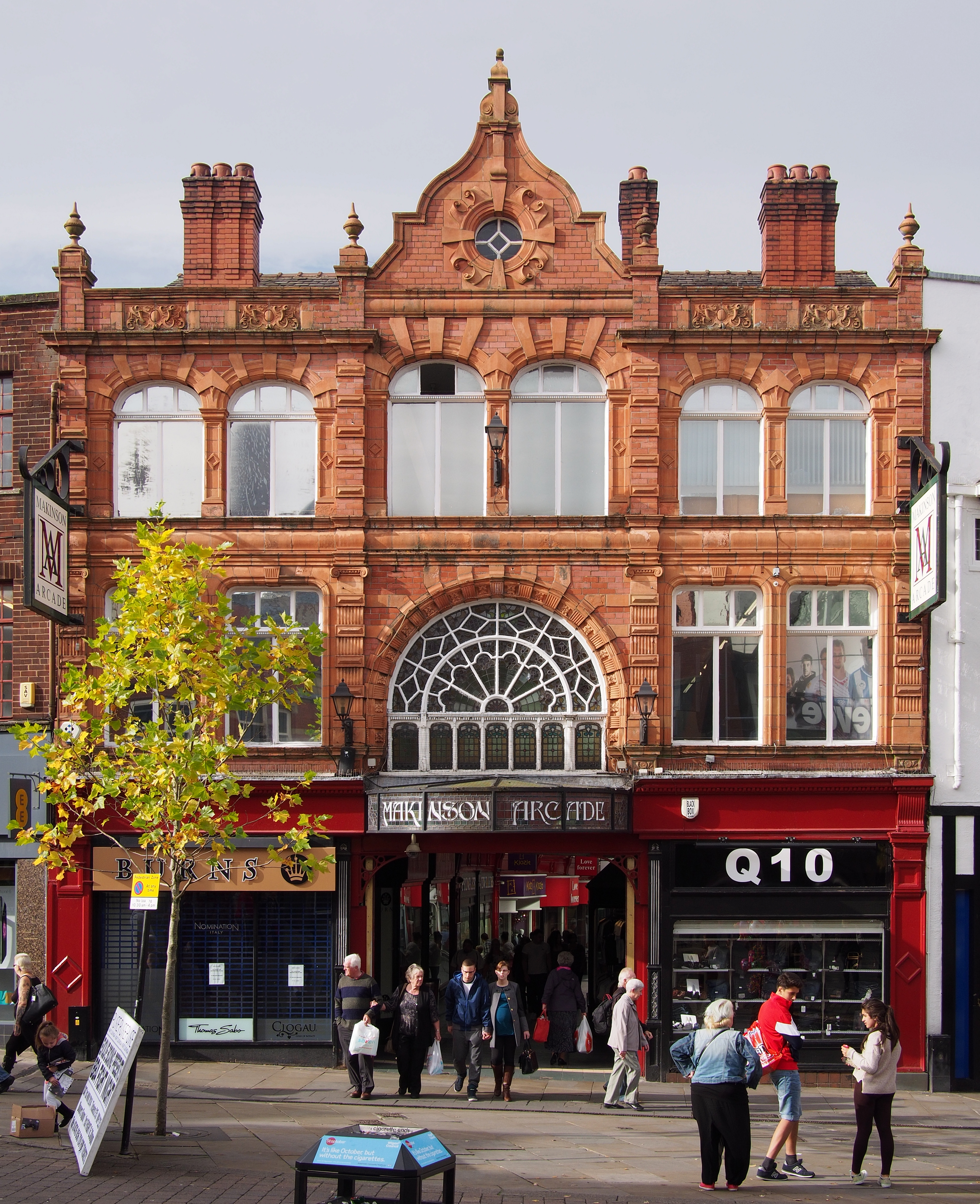
The entrance to the Makinson Arcade

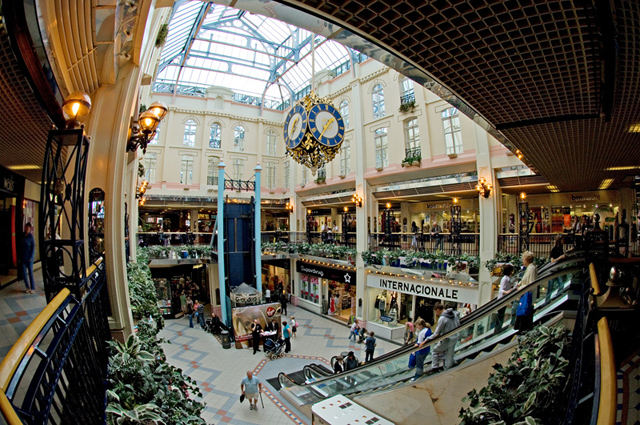
Inside Leigh Arcade in the Galleries

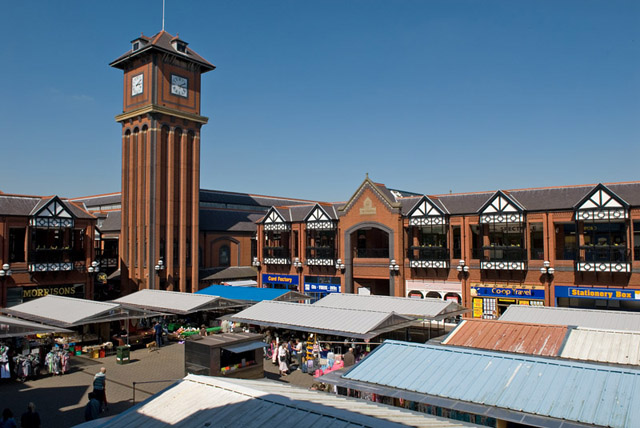
A view from the Galleries looking towards Wigan Outdoor Market on Wigan Square

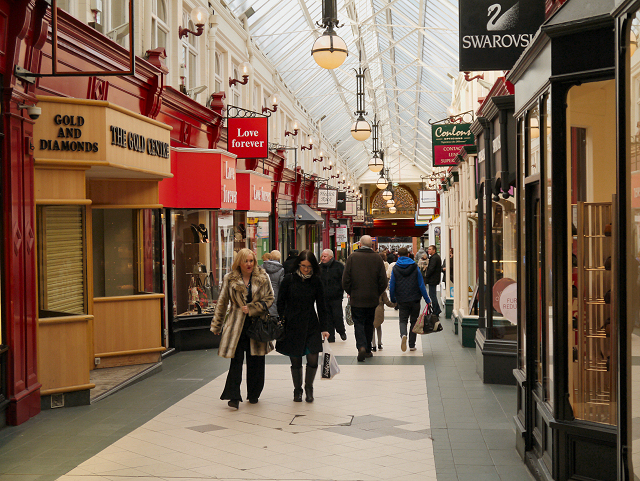
Inside Makinson Arcade

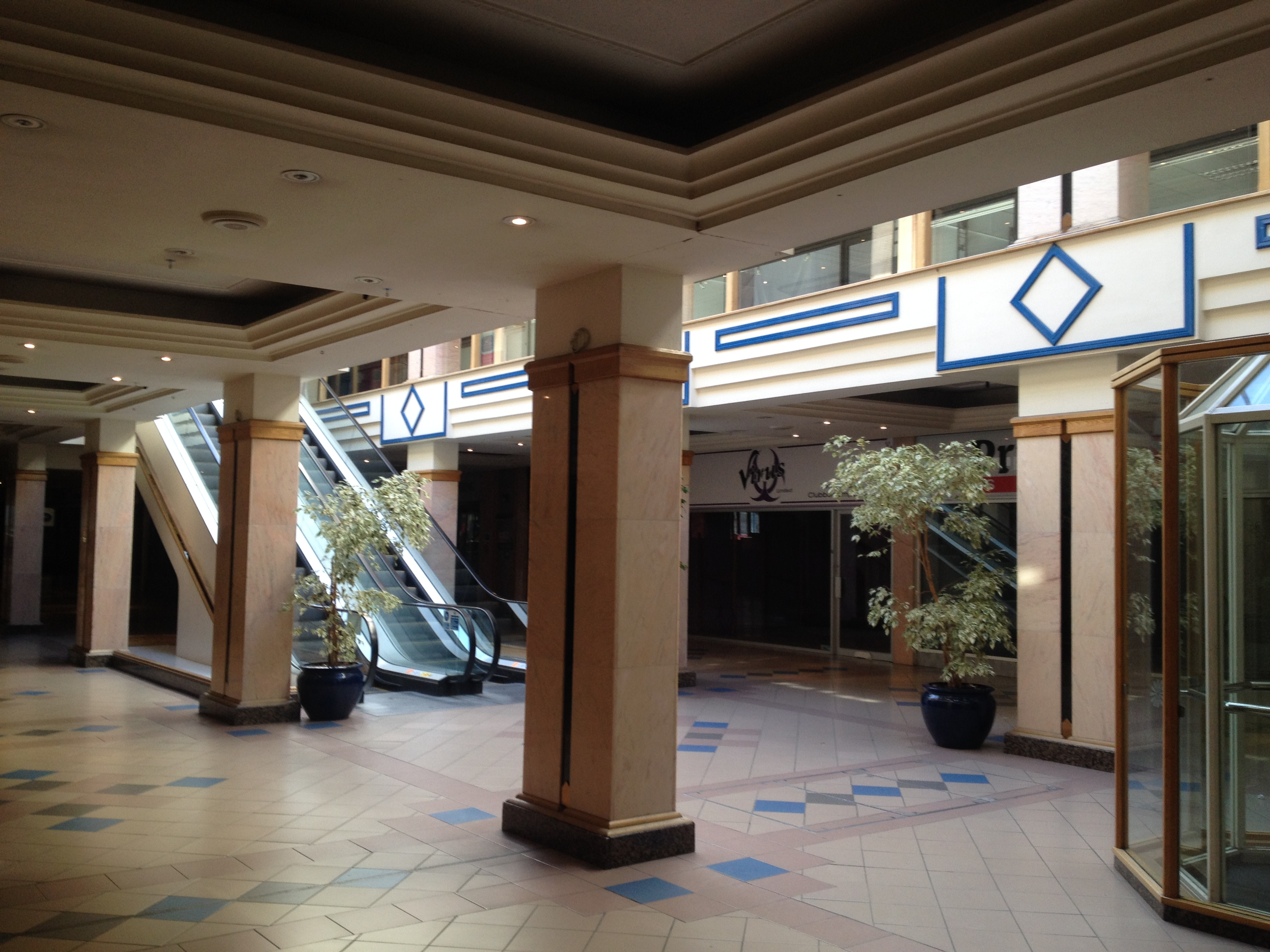
Inside the Marketgate Shopping Centre
