= Wigan Junction Railways =

Former railway company in North West England

Wigan Junction Railway

Overview
- Status: Closed
- Locale: North West England
- Termini: Glazebrook West Junction, Wigan Central

Technical
- Track gauge: 1,435 mm (4 ft 8 1/2 in) standard gauge

The Wigan Junction Railways connected Glazebrook West Junction with the Lancashire coalfields at Wigan, now in Greater Manchester, England.

== History ==
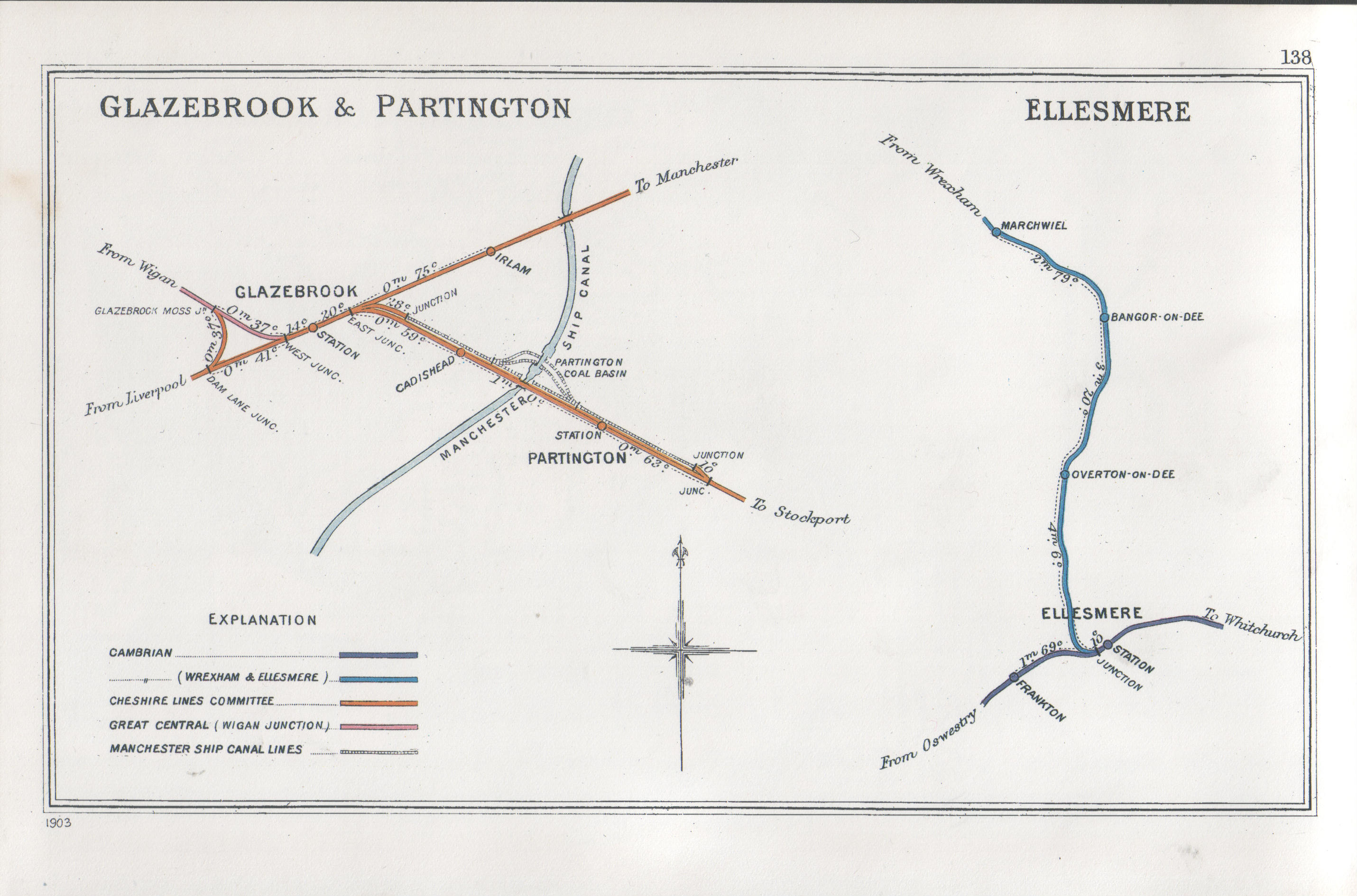
A Railway Clearing House map showing (left) railway lines around Glazebrook & Partington in 1903

Wigan Junction Railways Act 1874
- Act of Parliament
- Parliament of the United Kingdom
- Long title: An Act to authorise the Construction of Railways in Lancashire, to be called the Wigan Junction Railways.
- Citation: 37 & 38 Vict. c. cxvii

Dates
- Royal assent: 16 July 1874
Other legislation
Amended by	Wigan Junction Railways Act 1875

Wigan Junction Railways Act 1875
- Act of Parliament
- Parliament of the United Kingdom
- Long title: An Act for amending and extending the Wigan Junction Railways Act, 1874, for authorising the construction of additional Railways in Lancashire; and for other purposes.
- Citation: 38 & 39 Vict. c. clxxxix

Dates
- Royal assent: 2 August 1875
Other legislation
Amends	Wigan Junction Railways Act 1874

Text of statute as originally enacted

Wigan Junction Railways Act 1878
- Act of Parliament
- Parliament of the United Kingdom
- Long title: An Act to confer further powers upon the Wigan Junction Railways Company; to authorise the Manchester, Sheffield, and Lincolnshire Railway Company to subscribe to the undertaking of and to enter into arrangements with the Wigan Junction Railways Company; and for other purposes.
- Citation: 41 & 42 Vict. c. xcvii

Dates
- Royal assent: 17 June 1878

Text of statute as originally enacted

The Wigan Junction Railways (WJR) was incorporated by the Wigan Junction Railways Act 1874 (37 & 38 Vict. c. cxvii) on 16 July 1874. The company`s first chairman was Nathaniel Eckersley (1815-92). It was to link the coalfields around Wigan with the Cheshire Lines Committee (CLC) line at Glazebrook, on the line between Liverpool Central and Manchester Central. Promoted by local businessmen, it came to the interest of the board of the Manchester, Sheffield and Lincolnshire Railway (MSLR) which suggested that it might become an extension of the CLC, in which the MSLR had a one-third share. However, of the MSLR's other two joint partners in the CLC, the Midland Railway (MR) were in favour, whereas the Great Northern Railway (GNR) were not. Accordingly, the MSLR and MR decided that its construction should be supported by both companies, and later on be formally added to the Sheffield and Midland Railway Companies' Committee (SMRCC), a body which was owned jointly by the MSLR and MR only.

Construction began on 27 October 1876, the first sod being cut by the Home Secretary, the Rt. Hon. R. A. Cross, who was also MP for South West Lancashire. The line was opened between Glazebrook and Strangeways for goods on 16 October 1879, and was extended to Wigan on 1 April 1884; passenger services also began on 1 April 1884. The trains were provided by the MSLR. Wigan Central station was opened on 3 October 1892.

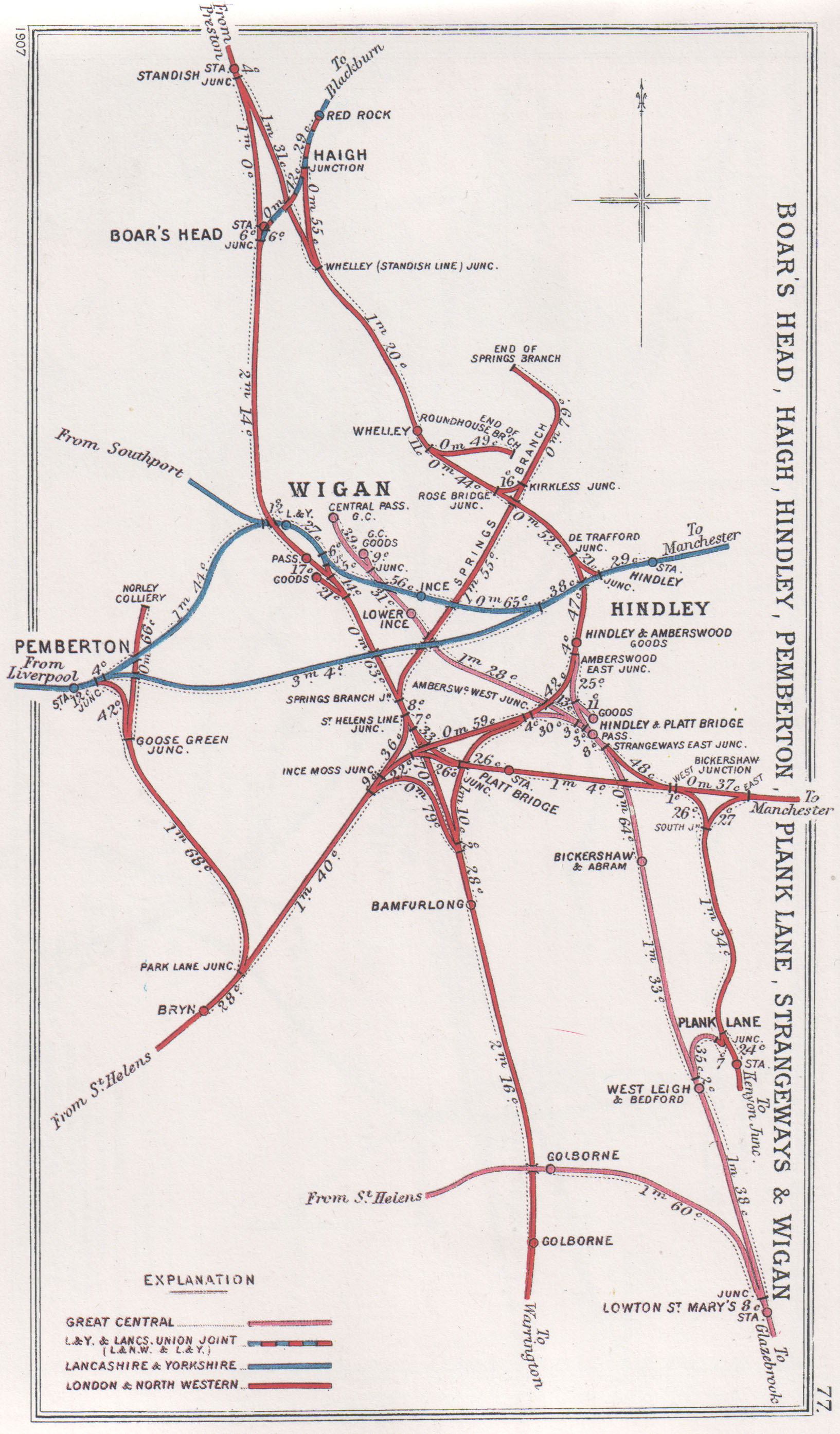
A Railway Clearing House map showing railway lines around Wigan in 1907

On 22 July 1885, the St. Helens and Wigan Junction Railway was incorporated to construct a branch to St Helens from the WJR at Lowton St. Marys: This company was renamed in July 1889 the Liverpool, St Helens and South Lancashire Railway (LSHSL); The line was opened on 2 January 1900.

The CLC constructed a curve from their line at Dam Lane Junction to the WJR line at Glazebrook Moss Junction; known as Glazebrook West Curve. 37 chains (810 yd; 740 m) in length, it was authorised on 25 May 1900 and opened on 1 July 1900, creating a triangular junction at Glazebrook; by this means, trains from Wigan (and also St. Helens) could run to Warrington Central and Liverpool Central.

On 4 August 1905, the GCR was authorised to absorb both the WJR and the LSHSL, which was formally carried out on 1 January 1906.

== Route ==
- Wigan Central
- Lower Ince
- Hindley South
- Bickershaw and Abram
- West Leigh and Bedford
- Lowton St Mary's
- Culcheth
- Newchurch Halt
- Glazebrook.

In April 1884, there were seven trains in each direction per day, all running between Manchester Central and Wigan. Six of these called at all stations between Glazebrook and Wigan; some also called at Urmston, Flixton and Irlam.

There were two expresses: the 10:40 from Manchester reached Wigan at 11:15, calling only at Glazebrook; and the 12:00 from Wigan, which ran non-stop to Manchester in half an hour. The Sunday service was of just two trains in each direction, calling at Urmston, Flixton, Irlam and all stations between Glazebrook and Wigan.

== The route today ==
In the 1970s, part of the trackbed was converted into the Culcheth Linear Park.

== Future ==
In 2009, the Association of Train Operating Companies (ATOC) identified the south part of the line connecting Glazebrook with the Chat Moss line as a feasible link line for freight use.
