= Hindley South railway station =

Former railway station in England

Hindley South

General information
- Location: Hindley, Wigan; England
- Coordinates: 53.5266°N 2.5860°W
- Grid reference: SD613036
- Platforms: 2

Other information
- Status: Disused

History
- Original company: Wigan Junction Railways
- Pre-grouping: Great Central Railway
- Post-grouping: London and North Eastern Railway

Key dates
- 1 April 1884: Opened as "Strangeways and Hindley"
- 1 January 1892: Renamed "Hindley and Platt Bridge"
- 1 July 1950: Renamed "Hindley South"
- 2 November 1964: Closed
Location

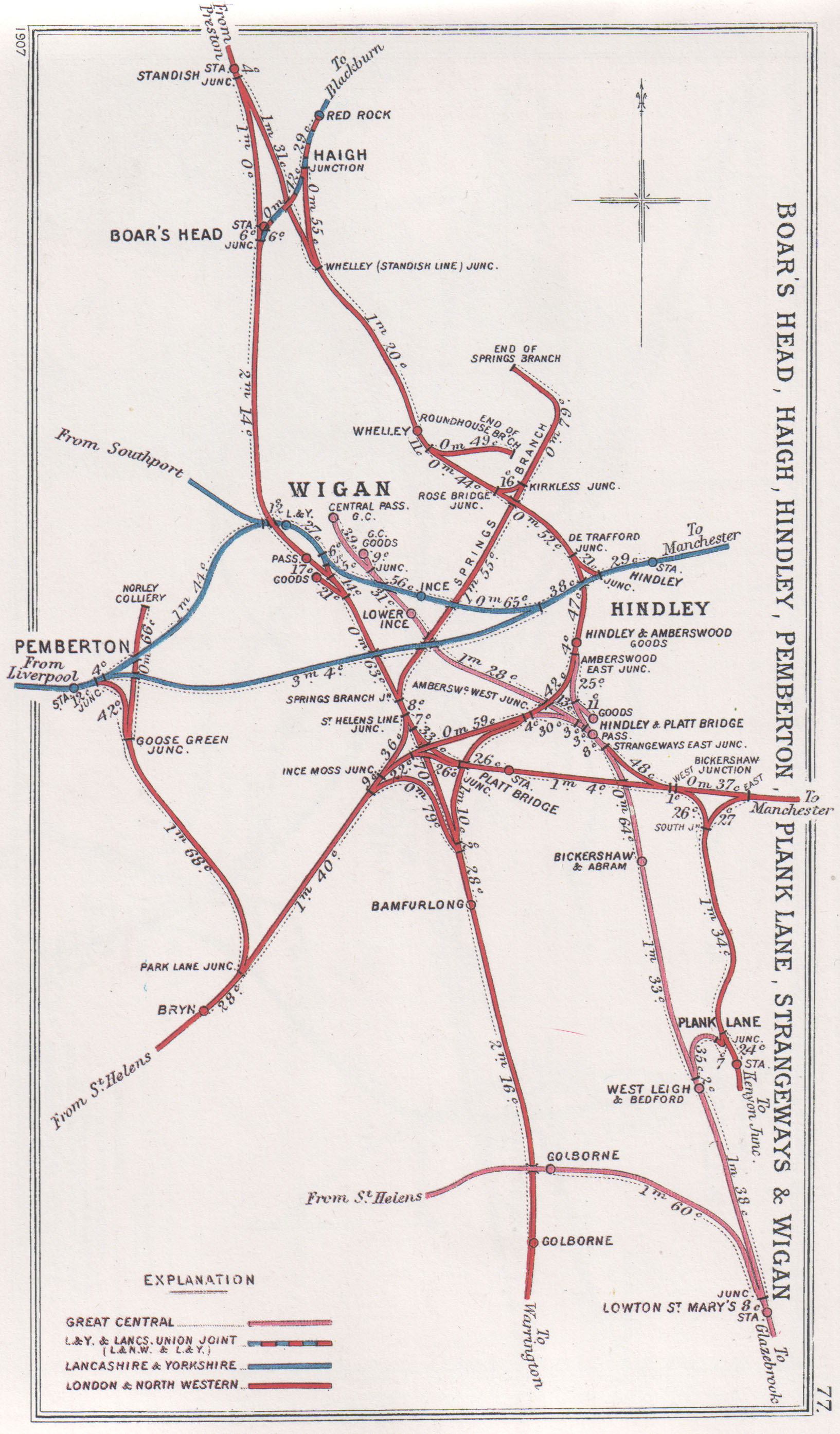
Map showing the location of Hindley and Platt Bridge passenger and good stations in the early 1900s

Hindley South railway station served the communities of Hindley and Platt Bridge, south-east of Wigan, England.

== Location and nearby stations ==
The station was on the Wigan Junction Railways line, known locally as the "Wigan Central line", which ran from Wigan Central to Glazebrook. It was situated immediately southeast of the A58 bridge over the tracks.

Until the 1960s the area surrounding Wigan had an unusually large number of intersecting railway lines, nowhere more so than in the south east of the town. Hindley South had a three-way junction immediately to the north, with arms west and north in both directions onto and from the "Whelley Loop" and northwest to Lower Ince and Wigan Central. It also had a two-way junction immediately to the south, which enabled trains to continue southeast along the Central line to Bickershaw and Abram and Manchester Central or to veer east onto the Manchester and Wigan Railway (MWR) line to Tyldesley and Manchester Exchange. By 2015 all these lines had long been lifted and in places obliterated.

There were other stations serving Hindley at Platt Bridge and Hindley Green on the MWR line.

Hindley station (formerly Hindley North) on the line from Wigan Wallgate to Manchester remains open.

To add to the mix, Hindley and Platt Bridge goods station was situated immediately north of the passenger station, being located on a short branch line. A goods station named "Hindley and Amberswood" also served Hindley on the Whelley Loop.

== Services ==
The service patterns in 1895, 1947 and 1962 are fully documented in the authoritative Disused Stations website.

In April 1884 the service pattern was straightforward. Six "Down" (towards Wigan) trains called from Manchester Central. In addition, one "express" called at Glazebrook only and passed Lower Ince without stopping. Of the six, three called at all stations, the remaining three missed some stations between Manchester and Glazebrook. With the exception of the "express" all trains called at all stations between Glazebrook and Wigan. The "Up" service was similar.

In 1922 six "Down" trains called, All Stations from Manchester Central on "Weekdays" (Mondays to Saturdays), with a further evening train from Lowton St Mary's only. Three other trains called, apparently All Stations from Culcheth, but it is possible they originated from Liverpool Central or Warrington Central and turned west to north at Glazebrook West Junction. One of these trains ran on Fridays and Saturdays Only and the other two ran on Saturdays Only. The "Up" service was broadly similar, but the mix of Saturday Only trains was even more complicated. There was no Sunday service.

The line through Hindley South was also a diversionary route and a route by which traffic such as Summer Saturday holiday specials could bypass busy spots, such as Wigan. Pixton, for example, has a fine 1961 shot of a Summer Saturday Sheffield to Blackpool train at Lowton St Mary's which will bear right immediately north of Hindley South onto the Whelley Loop and then join the WCML at Standish, bypassing Wigan altogether.

== Opening, naming and closure ==
The station opened as "Strangeways and Hindley" in 1884. It was renamed "Hindley and Platt Bridge" in 1892, only to be renamed for the final time as "Hindley South" in 1950. The station was closed on 2 November 1964, when the line closed to passengers. The line closed to goods in 1965.

== The station in the present day ==
The site has been razed, though the A58 bridge still rises to cross the erstwhile tracks.

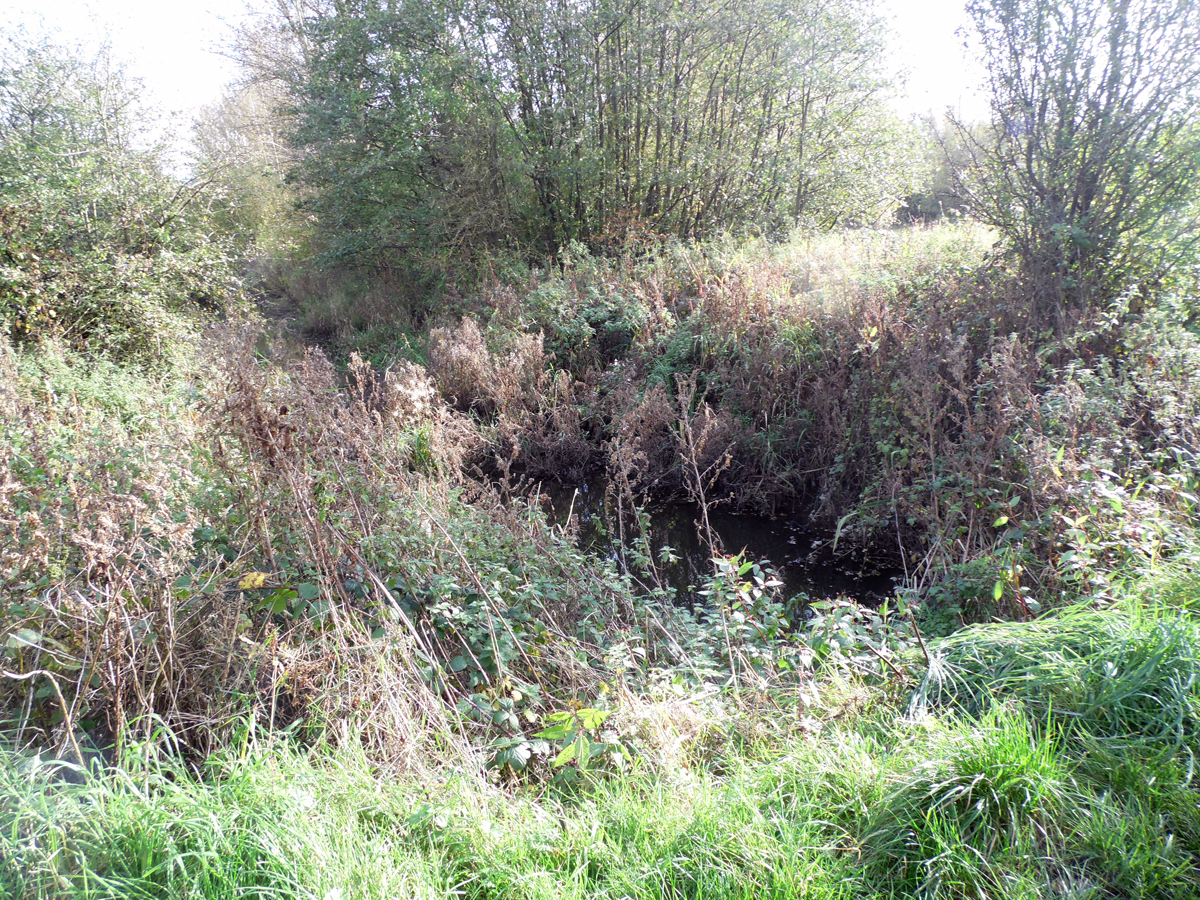
Hindley South Railway Station October 2017

Preceding station	Disused railways	Following station
Lower Ince; Line and station closed	Great Central Railway; Wigan Junction Railways	Bickershaw and Abram; Line and station closed
