= Wigan Central railway station =

Former railway station in Greater Manchester, England

Wigan Central
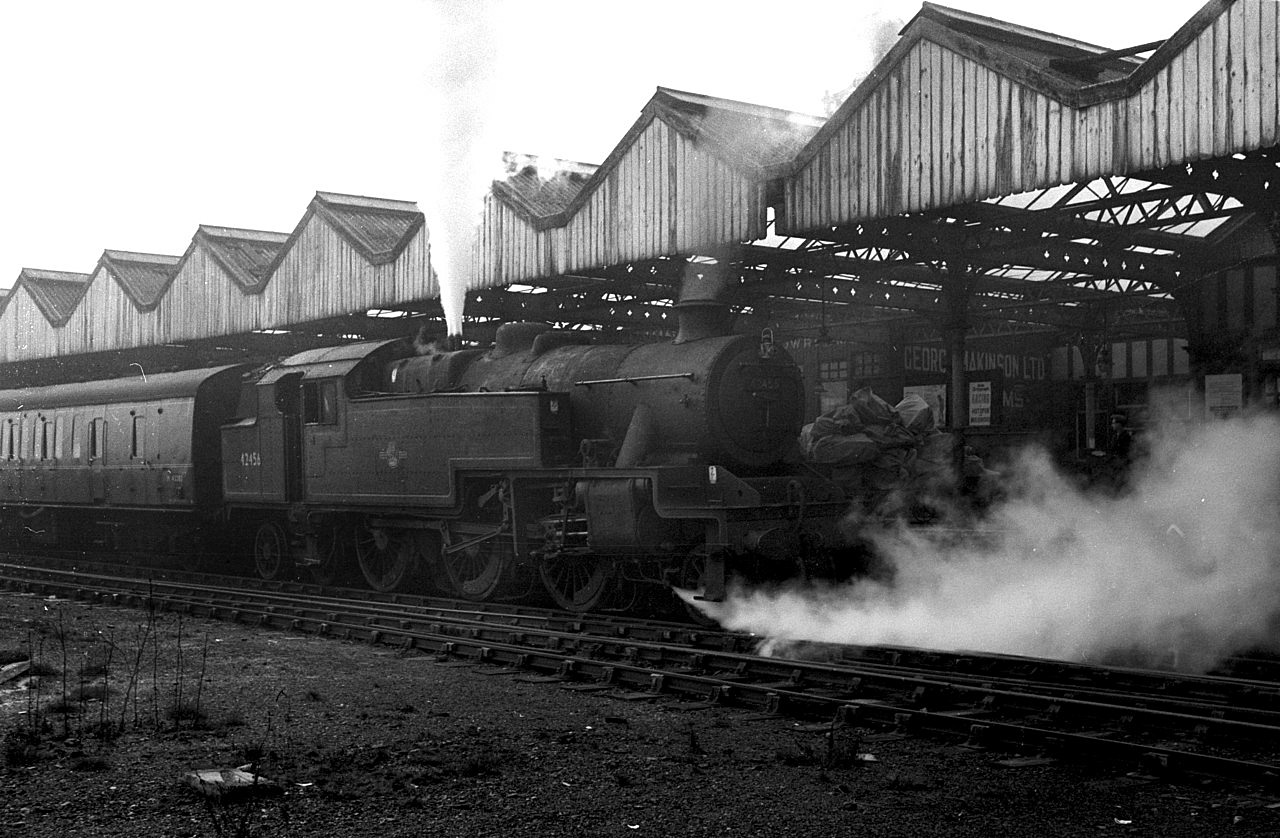
- A locomotive arriving at the station in 1963

General information
- Location: Wigan, Metropolitan Borough of Wigan, England
- Coordinates: 53.5459°N 2.6281°W
- Grid reference: SJ585057
- Platforms: 1 plus Island

Other information
- Status: Disused

History
- Original company: Wigan Junction Railways
- Pre-grouping: Great Central Railway
- Post-grouping: London and North Eastern Railway

Key dates
- 3 October 1892: Opened
- 2 November 1964: Closed to passengers
- 5 April 1965: Closed completely
Location

Wigan Central was one of three railway stations between 1892 and 1965 that served the centre of Wigan, in Lancashire (now in Greater Manchester), England. The site is now used by a shopping centre.

== History ==
=== Location and construction ===
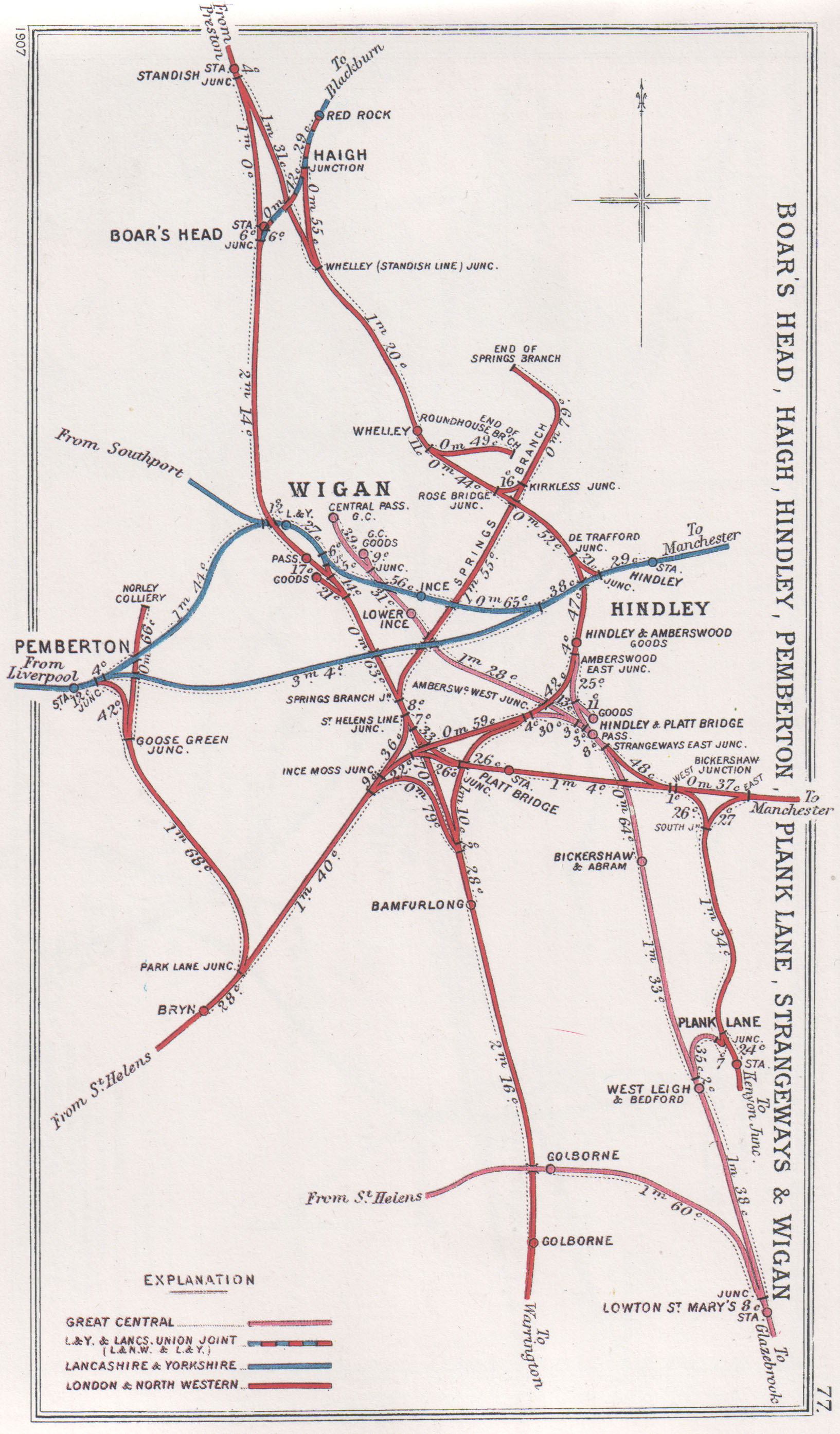
Lines around Wigan in 1907

Wigan Central was sited on Station Road, around 300 yards (270 m) from the two main stations, North Western and Wallgate, with all three lying within the historical town centre boundary of the river Douglas course.

It was the terminus of the Wigan Junction Railways from Glazebrook West Junction. It was built by the Manchester, Sheffield and Lincolnshire Railway, later to become the Great Central Railway, and opened on 3 October 1892. It replaced the temporary Wigan Darlington Street terminus, which had opened on 1 April 1884. Central was about 550 yards (500 m) nearer to the town centre than Darlington Street.

=== Operations ===
According to Richard Beeching's Reshaping of British Railways, (Note: See Appendix Passenger Line Usage Map.) the line was used more heavily than many which did not close; however, as with many unmodernised and heavily used commuter lines, it was deemed to be uneconomic. The line's main passenger traffic came from workers travelling from the Wigan area to industrial plants in Cadishead and Partington, and around the docks in Salford and Manchester. Until the late 1970s, the Lancashire United bus company operated a replacement bus service from Wigan to Partington.

Steam remained the dominant motive power to the end of services, although some diesel multiple units made an appearance.

== Services ==
In 1922:

- Six down trains arrived, all stations from Manchester Central on Mondays to Saturdays, with a further evening train from Lowton St Mary's only
- Three other trains arrived, all stations from Culcheth, but it is possible they originated at Liverpool Central and turned west to north at Dam Lane Junction. One of these trains ran on Fridays and Saturdays only, and the other two ran on Saturdays only.

The up service was broadly similar, but the mix of Saturday-only trains was even more complicated. There was no Sunday service.

Preceding station	Disused railways	Following station
Terminus	Great Central Railway; Wigan Junction Railways	Lower Ince; Line and station closed

=== Closure ===
The station closed to passengers on 2 November 1964 and to all traffic the following April. It was demolished in 1973.

== The site today ==
The Grand Arcade shopping centre was built on the station site between 2006 and 2008. No traces of the station remain today.

== See also ==
- List of closed railway stations in Britain
- Liverpool, St Helens & South Lancashire Railway
- Old railway lines in Wigan.
