= Golborne North railway station =

Former railway station in North-West England

Golborne North
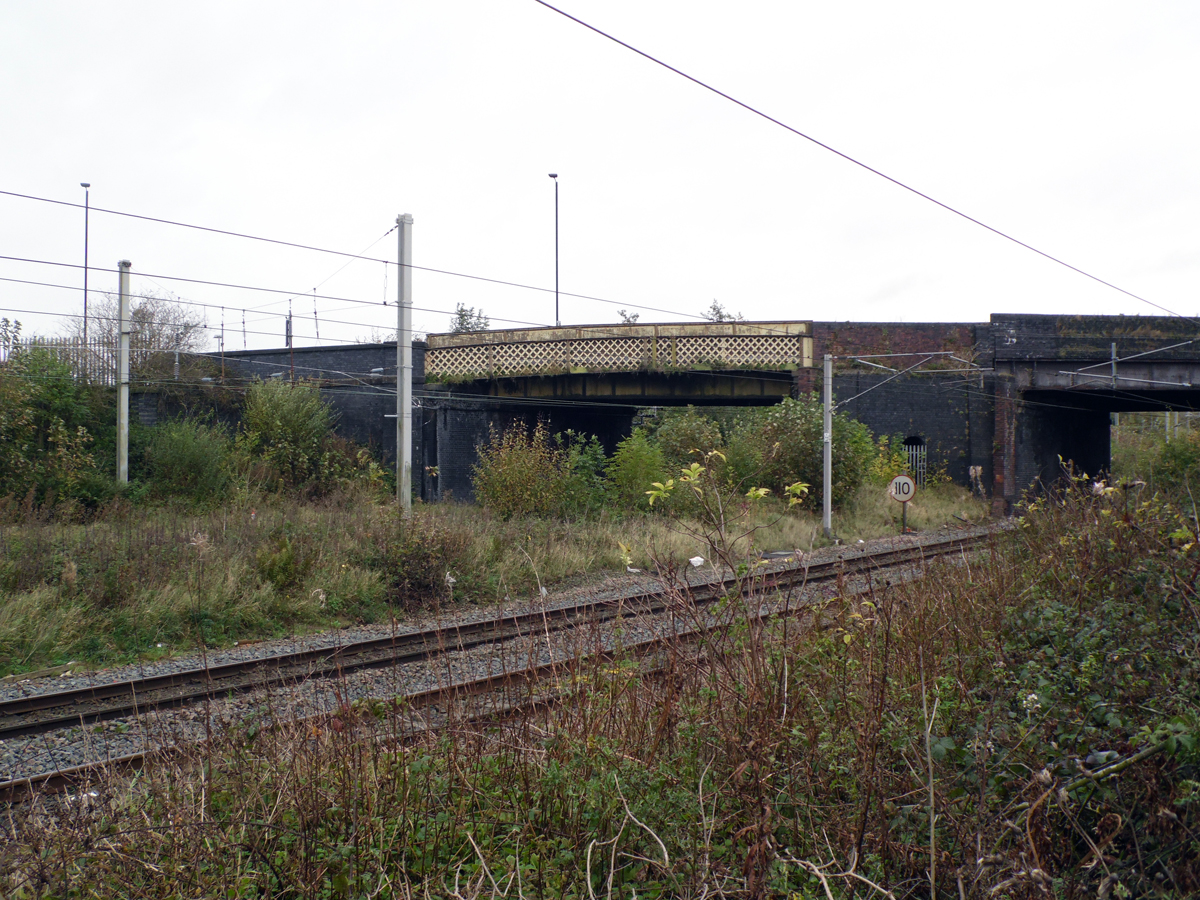
- The site of the station in 2017

General information
- Location: Golborne, Metropolitan Borough of Wigan; England
- Coordinates: 53.485601°N 2.593035°W
- Grid reference: SJ607989
- Platforms: 2

Other information
- Status: Disused

History
- Original company: Liverpool, St Helens and South Lancashire Railway
- Pre-grouping: Great Central Railway
- Post-grouping: London and North Eastern Railway

Key dates
- 1 July 1895: Station opened for goods
- 3 January 1900: Station opened for passengers as "Golborne"
- 1 February 1949: Renamed "Golborne North"
- 3 March 1952: Station closed completely
Location

Golborne North railway station served the town of Golborne, in the Metropolitan Borough of Wigan, Greater Manchester, England.

The station was on the Liverpool, St Helens and South Lancashire Railway line from Lowton St Mary's to the original St Helens Central railway station. It was located just east of where it crossed both the WCML and what is now the A573, at the northern edge of the town.

The station was built of wood and had very sparse facilities.

== History ==
Opened by the Liverpool, St Helens and South Lancashire Railway, as part of the Great Central Railway, it became part of the London and North Eastern Railway during the Grouping of 1923. The station then passed on to the London Midland Region of British Railways on nationalisation in 1948. The station was referred to locally as "Golborne GC" to distinguish it from the ex-LNWR Golborne station on the West Coast Main Line in the centre of the town. In 1949, the ex-LNWR station was renamed Golborne South and the ex-GCR station was renamed Golborne North.

== Services ==
In 1922, five "down" (towards St Helens) trains called at the station on Mondays to Saturdays. They called at all stations from Manchester Central to St Helens via Glazebrook and Culcheth.

By 1948, four trains plied between St Helens Central and Manchester Central, calling at all stations, Monday to Friday, reduced to three on Saturdays.

A fuller selection of public and working timetables has now been published. Among other things, this suggests that Sunday services ran until 1914 but had ceased by 1922, never to return.

== Closure ==
The station was closed to all traffic by British Railways in 1952, though goods traffic through the site to St Helens lingered on until 1965, and to a scrapyard in Haydock. In 1968, a new connection ("spur") was built connecting a Shell oil terminal in Haydock and the scrapyard to the West Coast Main Line. This enabled the line through Golborne North to be closed and lifted.

== The site today ==
By 2005, even seasoned researchers could not tell a railway had ever existed at the station site.

Preceding station	Disused railways	Following station
Lowton St Mary's; Line and station closed	Great Central Railway; Liverpool, St Helens and South Lancashire Railway	Haydock Park; Line and station closed
