= Ashton-in-Makerfield railway station =

Disused railway station in Haydock, Merseyside

Ashton-in-Makerfield

General information
- Location: Haydock, St Helens; England
- Coordinates: 53.47975°N 2.63915°W
- Grid reference: SJ577983
- Platforms: 2

Other information
- Status: Disused

History
- Original company: Liverpool, St Helens and South Lancashire Railway
- Pre-grouping: Great Central Railway
- Post-grouping: London and North Eastern Railway

Key dates
- 1 July 1895: Station opened for goods
- 3 January 1900: Station opened for passengers
- 3 March 1952: Closed to regular traffic
- After 4 October 1975: Closed to racecourse traffic
Location

Ashton-in-Makerfield railway station was a railway station serving the town of Ashton-in-Makerfield, although it was located in the neighbouring village of Haydock, formerly in Lancashire (now Merseyside), England.

The station was located where Lodge Lane (A49) crossed the Liverpool, St Helens and South Lancashire Railway line from Lowton St Mary's to the original St Helens Central railway station.

== History ==
Opened by the Liverpool, St Helens and South Lancashire Railway, as part of the Great Central Railway, it became part of the London and North Eastern Railway at the Grouping of 1923. The line and station passed to the Eastern Region of British Railways on nationalisation in 1948, but was transferred to the London Midland Region later that year.

== Services ==
In 1922 five "down" (towards St Helens) trains called at the station, on Mondays to Saturdays. These called at all stations from Manchester Central to St Helens via Glazebrook and Culcheth. No trains called on Sundays.

By 1948 four trains plied between St Helens Central and Manchester Central, calling at all stations, Monday to Friday, reduced to three on Saturdays. No trains called on Sundays.

A fuller selection of public and working timetables has now been published. Among other things this suggests that Sunday services ran until 1914, but had ceased by 1922, never to return.

== Closure and afterlife ==
The station was closed to passengers by the British Railways Board in 1952.

From 1952 until 5 October 1963 some race day specials to Haydock Park had deposited their passengers at the racecourse then travelled to St Helens for servicing, turning and to await their turn to return in the evening. Others did the same at Ashton-in-Makerfield. A more recent source states that the last such trains ran on 4 January 1965.

Enthusiasts' railtours travelled the line on 29 September 1956 and 21 September 1963.

The final such tour visited the station on 24 August 1968. Although a last, this tour was also a first, being the first passenger train over a new connection between the line to Ashton and the WCML at the new "Haydock Branch Junction" north of Golborne, which had opened on 22 April 1968. By providing this connection the line between Edge Green and Lowton St Mary's could be abandoned and, in particular, its bridge over the to-be-electrified WCML could be removed. This occurred in 1971.

Services to and through Ashton finally ended in 1988, but its last years were not mere decline. Two services used the station and one passed through it. In 1963 Lowton Metals started to use the station's goods yard as a rail-served base for its scrap metal business. This traffic ended in 1987. In July 1968 the line to the west was reopened to serve a new oil distribution depot at Haydock. This traffic continued until 1983. In 1975 an experiment was conducted in reviving race traffic, using Ashton station instead of Haydock Park. Special trains were run to at least five meetings, but the experiment was not continued.

Preceding station	Disused railways	Following station
Haydock Park; Line and station closed	Great Central Railway; Liverpool, St Helens and South Lancashire Railway	Haydock; Line and station closed

== The site today ==
The station site has been landscaped as part of a business park.
