= Haydock Park railway station =

Former railway station in Lancashire, England

Haydock Park

General information
- Location: Haydock, St Helens; England
- Coordinates: 53.481363°N 2.625267°W
- Grid reference: SJ584984
- Platforms: 2

Other information
- Status: Disused

History
- Original company: Liverpool, St Helens and South Lancashire Railway
- Pre-grouping: Great Central Railway
- Post-grouping: London and North Eastern Railway

Key dates
- 10 February 1899: Station opened for race day traffic
- 5 October 1963: Station closed
Location

Haydock Park railway station was a railway station adjacent to Haydock Park Racecourse, formerly in Lancashire and now in Merseyside, England. The station's sole purpose was to handle race day traffic. It did not feature in public timetables and normal service trains passed through the station without stopping.

The station was on the Liverpool, St Helens and South Lancashire Railway line from Lowton St Mary's to the original St Helens Central railway station. It stood behind the racecourse's grandstand.

== History ==
Opened by the Liverpool, St Helens and South Lancashire Railway, as part of the Great Central Railway, it became part of the London and North Eastern Railway during the Grouping of 1923. The station then passed on to the London Midland Region of British Railways on nationalisation in 1948.

== Services ==
Race Day specials were very heavily patronised until well after WW2, as were other specials such as those serving Wakes Weeks and football matches. Although railways are always best suited to regular, day-in-day-out traffic, with cheap labour and plentiful old rolling stock available until the 1960s such intermittent services could make money and be seen as worthwhile. The corporate climate and economics were shifting, however. The station was closed in October 1963. An experiment in running race day specials was run in 1975, using the long-closed Ashton-in-Makerfield station some 500 yards to the west, with the trains passing through Haydock Park station's carcass. This was not repeated after that year.

== After closure ==
The line through the station continued in use by trains to an oil depot at Haydock until 1983 and Lowton Metals scrapyard, Haydock, until 1987, after which the tracks through the site were lifted.

By 2005 much of the station site had disappeared under a car park extension and other landscaping, though parts of the station footbridge were still standing among undergrowth in 2014.

Preceding station	Disused railways	Following station
Golborne North; Line and station closed	Great Central Railway; Liverpool, St Helens and South Lancashire Railway	Ashton-in-Makerfield; Line and station closed
