= Haydock railway station =

Former railway station in England

Haydock

General information
- Location: Haydock, St Helens; England
- Coordinates: 53.465750°N 2.671916°W
- Grid reference: SJ555967
- Platforms: 2

Other information
- Status: Disused

History
- Original company: Liverpool, St Helens and South Lancashire Railway
- Pre-grouping: Great Central Railway
- Post-grouping: London and North Eastern Railway

Key dates
- 1 July 1895: Station opened for goods
- 3 January 1900: Station opened for passengers
- 1930-38: Down platform closed
- 1944: Closed for goods
- 3 March 1952: Station closed completely
Location

Haydock railway station served the village of Haydock, formerly in Lancashire, now in Merseyside, England.

The station was on the Liverpool, St Helens and South Lancashire Railway line from Lowton St Mary's to the original St Helens Central railway station where it was crossed by what is now the A599 in the centre of the village.

East of the station was the 99 yards (91 m) Haydock Colliery Tunnel, the only tunnel on the line. It was built at the railway's expense using the 'cut and cover' method. Its sole purpose was to burrow beneath Haydock Colliery's tracks.

== History ==
Opened by the Liverpool, St Helens and South Lancashire Railway, as part of the Great Central Railway, it became part of the London and North Eastern Railway during the Grouping of 1923. The line and station passed to the Eastern Region of British Railways on nationalisation in 1948, being transferred to the London Midland Region later that year.

The line through the station was originally double track and the station had two platforms. In the 1930s the down (St Helens-bound) track was changed into a long siding and all trains to and from St Helens used the up line. The station's down side shelter and signs were removed.

== Services ==
In 1922 five "down" (towards St Helens) trains called at the station, Mondays to Saturdays. These called at all stations from Manchester Central to St Helens via Glazebrook and Culcheth. The "up" service was similar.

By 1948 four trains plied between St Helens Central and Manchester Central, calling at all stations, Monday to Friday, reduced to three on Saturdays.

A fuller selection of public and working timetables has now been published. Among other things this suggests that Sunday services ran until 1914, but had ceased by 1922 never to return.

== Closure ==
The station was closed to passenger traffic by the British Railways Board in 1952, though goods traffic through to St Helens lingered on until 1965, when the tracks west of Ashton-in-Makerfield were abandoned. A short stretch from Ashton through the Haydock station site to a new Shell distribution depot was reinstated in 1968. This ceased being rail-served in 1983, whereafter the line was cut back to Lowton Metals' scrapyard at Ashton. Tracks were eventually lifted.

== The site today ==
By 2003 modern housing had obliterated the station site.

Preceding station	Disused railways	Following station
Ashton-in-Makerfield; Line and station closed	Great Central Railway; Liverpool, St Helens and South Lancashire Railway	St Helens Central (GCR); Line and station closed
