= Haydock =

Coordinates: 53.4678°N 2.6609°W

- Village
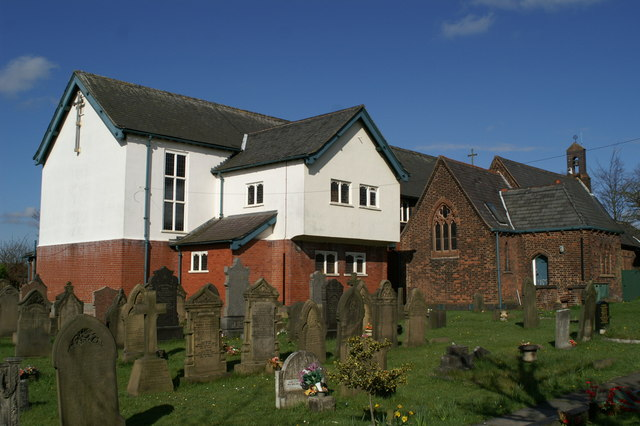
- St. James' Parish Church, Haydock

- Location within Merseyside
- Population: 11,416 (2011 Census)
- OS grid reference: SJ557968
- Metropolitan borough: St Helens
- Metropolitan county: Merseyside
- Region: North West
- Country: England
- Sovereign state: United Kingdom
- Post town: ST. HELENS
- Postcode district: WA11
- Dialling code: 01942 / 01744
- Police: Merseyside
- Fire: Merseyside
- Ambulance: North West
- UK Parliament: St Helens North

Haydock is a village within the Metropolitan Borough of St Helens, in Merseyside, England. At the 2011 Census, it had a population of 11,416 Haydock's historic area covers the Haydock electoral ward and a section of the Blackbrook ward.

Haydock is located within the boundaries of the historic county of Lancashire. The village is located to the north-east of the adjacent St Helens, with most of its residential estates and commercial property built either side of the A599. Historically a township and large pastoral area, Haydock was found to be rich with coal and the area grew in significance during the Industrial Revolution particularly with the coming of the canals and railways. In the 1930s, the north side of Haydock was bisected by the A580 East Lancashire Road; this dual carriageway connected the cities of Liverpool and Manchester, with several junctions serving St Helens and Haydock. The area to the south of the East Lancs road saw large post-war residential development, while the area to the north, that was initially open pits, saw large scale industrialisation. More recently, the area north of the road has seen the development of distribution centres encouraged by the proximity of junction 23 of the M6 motorway and Haydock's convenient transport links to Liverpool and Manchester.

Haydock is the home of the Haydock Park Racecourse, while the old mining tip and spoil areas south of the village have been developed into the Lyme & Wood Pits Country Park.

== History ==
The placename means "barley, wheat" with the suffix -aco meaning "place". An undated source refers to the name as Heidiog. The village is often referred to by the colloquial name of 'Yick', and its inhabitants may be referred to as 'Yickers' .

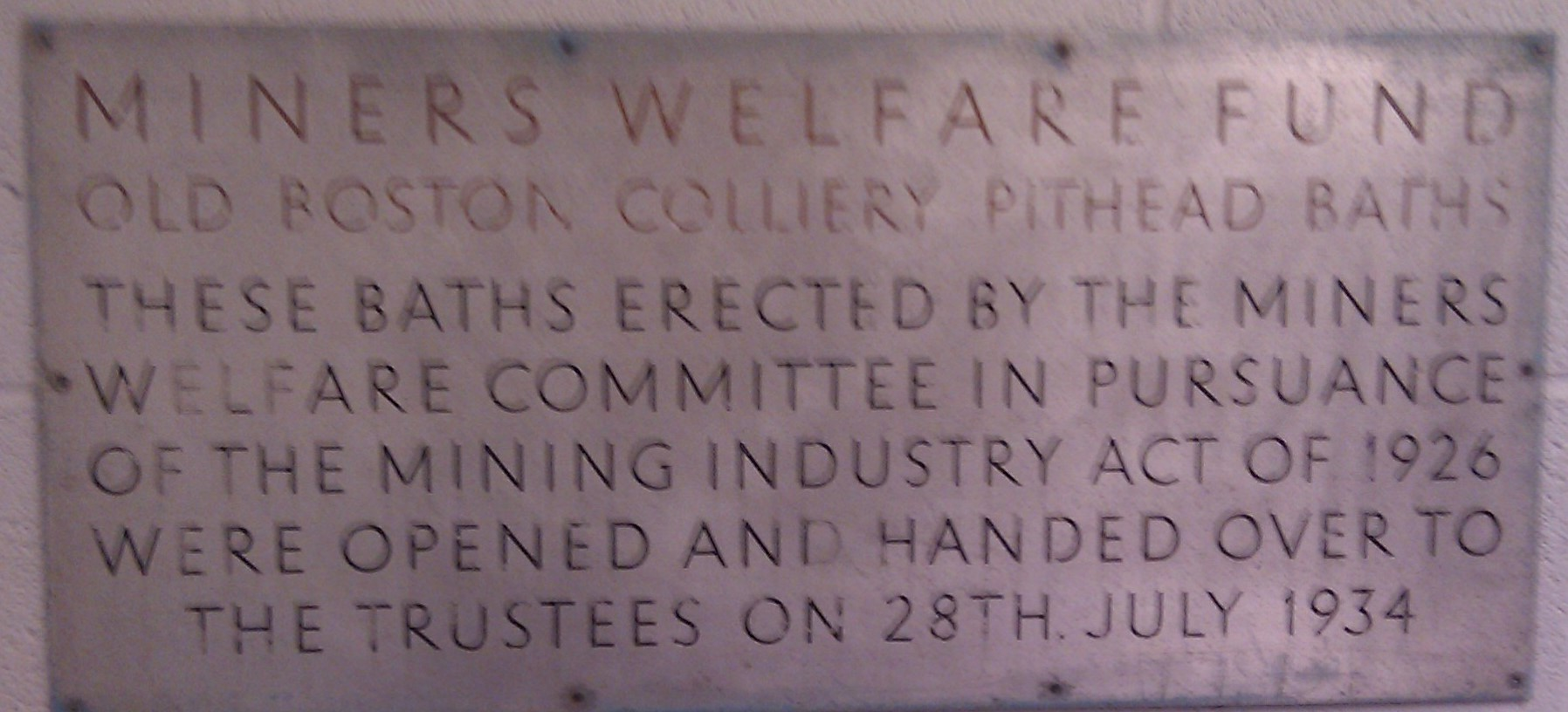
Old Boston Colliery baths

Haydock was one of the United Kingdom's richest areas in coal and coal mining, Haydock Collieries had up to 13 collieries working at one time. The last colliery in Haydock – Wood Pit – closed in 1971, bringing to an end coal mining in the area. This site had been the scene of the Wood Pit disaster on 7 June 1878 which a subsequent report of the Inspector of Mines concluded claimed the lives of 189 men and boys. Among them were forty-five-year-old Nathan Boon and his five sons. According to GenUKI, 15 victims were not included in the Inspector's report but their names "appeared in the Coroner's Inquest and in some cases in the burial registers". If included, the final death toll would have been 204.

The Old Boston Trading Estate was built atop the colliery of the same name in the north of Haydock. After the colliery was closed, due to an underground fire, the site was used for many years as a training centre for National Coal Board employees.

Surrounded by agricultural farmland, much of the village's expansion was due to mining and canal transport. In the early 1900s, Haydock had no fewer than three railway stations–Haydock, Ashton-in-Makerfield, and Haydock Park–along the line which passed through from St. Helens to Lowton.

== Governance ==
Haydock was a township in the parish of Winwick before being made a civil parish in 1866. The village was in the poor law union of Warrington in the 19th century before being created an urban district in 1894.

Between 1830 and 1983 Haydock was part of the Newton parliamentary constituency. In 1983 the Newton constituency, containing Golborne, Irlam and Newton-le-Willows urban districts, and Warrington Rural District (containing Winwick), was divided, and Haydock, along with Newton-le-Willows, was incorporated into the St Helens North Constituency.

The traditional Haydock boundary encapsulated part of Blackbrook, and part of Haydock Park (the northern perimeter made up by Garswood Park and the course of Clipsley Brook). The western boundary was Blackbrook, downstream of its confluence with Clipsley Brook, while the eastern boundary was composed of Sandy Lane and Newton Lane as far south as Dean Dam and Cowhey Dam. Portions of the old Haydock Parish are now within the modern Newton-le-Willows for the purposes of local administration and postal services, and utilise 01942 dial codes due to their proximity to those local exchanges.

Changing local administrative boundaries in 1933 transferred 16 acres of land to the Ashton-in-Makerfield civil parish which is, today, one of the seven parishes of St Helens.

Further ward profile changes in 2007 to those made in 2004 extended the Haydock ward, reducing the Billinge and Seneley Green Ward. Part of the Haydock Royal Air Force site housing development, including Slag Lane along with a section of Liverpool Road, was appropriated to Haydock and Blackbrook wards respectively, for electoral purposes. Seneley Green Parish Council continue to collect the parish precept and have authority on planning issues.

In January 2009 Haydock as part of the St Helens Metropolitan Borough agreed to form the Liverpool City Region, a Multi-Area Agreement enjoying greater devolved powers than local government. In 2014 this was established in statute as the Liverpool City Region Combined Authority covering the metropolitan county of Merseyside and the adjacent Borough of Halton.

== Community and Culture ==
Before nationalisation of the coal industry in 1947, Haydock's collieries were principally operated by Richard Evans & Co, whose name can be found today in two of the village's schools, Richard Evans Infant School and Richard Evans Junior School, which closed in 2006 due to falling pupil numbers. The school is now used as a music centre by the local Valley Brass Band who take their name from the Grange Valley area of Haydock.

Other schools in the area include Outwood Academy Haydock, Legh Vale Primary School, St. James' Church of England Primary, Grange Valley Primary School and English Martyrs Primary School. Outwood Academy Haydock was previously named Haydock Secondary Modern School and then Haydock High School. Haydock has many sport facilities including Haydock Park Racecourse, Haydock Cricket Club, Haydock leisure centre. Haydock is also home to Independent Futsal Club the first 5v5 Futsal Club in the county.

In 2007 a Tesco supermarket was built on the site of former coal industry workshops. This development led to the demolition of the old Conservative club building. Nearby are Iceland and Aldi supermarkets and other shops and restaurants. This area is now considered the main retail section of Haydock.

Haydock has a country park, known as the Lyme and Wood Pits Park. It is situated on the side of the hill that is home to the landfill site. In 2009 local schools from Haydock and Earlestown planted a variety of trees on the hill as part of the plans. The park includes many walks, ponds and a memorial to the 189 miners who lost their lives in the Wood pit explosion in 1878. Haydock Forest was awarded Green Flag status in early 2012.

King George V Playing Fields houses a play area and astro-turf pitch, and is home to Haydock Juniors and local open age football teams. In 2009, Brazilian Soccer Schools was launched in Haydock for local junior players which grew and became a Football and Futebol de Salao centre for Lancashire and Merseyside.

Haydock is the home of the Haydock Park Racecourse. It was built between 1898 and 1899 on 127 acres of the historic Haydock Park land granted by Lord Newton to replace the older Newton le Willows course (home of the Newton Races) which was situated on Newton Common adjacent to Swan Lane and was closed in 1890. The origins of the Old Newton Cup can be traced back to 1752, when racing was taking place on Golborne Heath, not far from the present course. On 16 June that year a £50 Cup was competed for at Golborne, sponsored by the Newton Hunt. The races subsequently moved to Newton le Willows early in the 19th century.

Haydock has several churches:

- Bethany Hall (Brethren)
- Christ Church (Haydock's tallest building, United Reformed Church)
- Ebenezer Independent Methodist (Independent Methodist)
- Haydock Wesleyan Methodist (Methodist) Closed 2012

- English Martyrs (Roman Catholic)
- St James' Church (Church of England)
- St Marks Church, Haydock (Church of England)

=== Music ===
The Valley Brass Band, recipients of the King's Award for Voluntary Service, and formed in 1992 is significant in its community activities in the area, teaching approximately 120 children to play brass and percussion instruments. The band operate a community centre at a former primary school and support many local groups through this endeavour. The group have a close connection to Haydock Male Voice Choir and they perform regular concerts together.

Founded in 1923, the Haydock Male Voice Choir is one of the oldest choirs in North West England with a continuous record, apart from the early years of the Second World War. It performs in the UK as well as in Germany and the USA which the choir have visited many times. Current membership of 70 men is drawn from a 25-mile radius of Haydock. In recent times the choir has won a number of competitions including the Isle of Man festival of choirs 2019 and Choir of the festival in 2020. Since 2014 the Musical Director has been Dan Craddock, the 10th conductor in the choir's 97 year history.

The Haydock Brass Band, formed in 1861, is the oldest community run organisation in St Helens. It performs brass band music in contests, theatrical productions, performances with choral organisations and corporate events. It rehearses at Grange Valley Youth Centre, where the band has been based for the last five years. The band annually performs the ceremonial fanfares at the start and finish of the Grand National in Aintree. Haydock band has a strong relationship with Haydock Park Racecourse. It has one of the largest and oldest libraries of brass band music in the country.

Since 2014, Haydock Park Racecourse has hosted music artists as one associate of The Jockey Club Live, currently the UK's 6th largest music promoter, annually. Celebrities who've headlined at the course include Busted, Kylie Minogue, Craig David, Olly Murs, Pete Tong, a tribute to Manchester's Haçienda nightclub and Tom Jones. Haydock Park has since been described as a "hotspot for live music entertainment".

== Transport ==
Haydock has transport links to Wigan, Ashton and St Helens via the 320. Some 320 buses terminate in Ashton and others in Wigan. There is also a number 20 bus that runs through Haydock, terminating at Earlestown. The 420 runs twice a day from Kenyons Lane South through to Halewood providing a direct link for Florida Farm Developments. Both of these services are run by Arriva. HTL buses (on behalf of Merseytravel) also operate in the area with the 156 which runs to Ashton Library and St Helens, and the 602 which operates between Newton Community Hospital and Ashton Heath, both running on evenings only. A few additional journeys on service 156 are operated by Hattons.

== Notable places ==
- Haydock High Sports College
- Haydock Industrial Estate
- St. James the Great Church
- Haydock English Martyrs Church
- Haydock Park Racecourse
- Haydock Island (East Lancs & M6)

== Notable people ==
- Saint Edmund Arrowsmith, one of the Forty Martyrs of England and Wales
- Rhys Houghhton, football manager for Manchester United FC
- Harry Burrows footballer
- Billy Caulfield, footballer
- Conor Coady, footballer
- Lewis Hancox, graphic novelist, social media personality and filmmaker
- Harry Gee, footballer
- Les Greenall, Rugby League player
- Wilf Hall footballer
- Lou Houghton, Rugby League player, St. Helens forward
- Harry Jones, footballer
- Martyn Lancaster footballer
- Nick McCabe of The Verve
- Tony Read, footballer
- James Twiss, footballer
- Neil Harmon, Rugby League player

== See also ==
- Church of St James the Great, Haydock
- List of mining disasters in Lancashire
