= HMRS =

HMRS may refer to:

- Hawk Mountain Ranger School, a search and rescue school in Pennsylvania, United States
- Historical Model Railway Society, a British organisation
