= Golborne railway station =

Golborne railway station may refer to the following stations in the English town of Golborne:

- Golborne South railway station, on the West Coast Main Line, open from 1839 to 1967, and known as Golborne until 1949.
- Golborne North railway station, on the Liverpool, St Helens and South Lancashire Railway, open from 1895 to 1952, also known as Golborne until 1949.
