= Jimmy Prescott =

English footballer

Personal information
- Full name: James Prescott
- Date of birth: 2 November 1930
- Place of birth: Lowton, England
- Date of death: 14 February 2011 (aged 80)
- Place of death: Warrington, England
- Position: Inside forward

Senior career*
Years	Team	Apps	(Gls)
- Lowton St. Mary's
1953–1955	Southport	53	(9)
1955–1956	York City	18	(5)
1956–1957	Southport	17	(1)
1957–1962	Wigan Athletic	135	(39)
Total		223	(54)
- * Club domestic league appearances and goals

James Prescott (2 November 1930 – 14 February 2011) was an English professional footballer who played as an inside forward.

== Career ==
Born in Lowton, Prescott played for Lowton St. Mary's, Southport, York City and Wigan Athletic. He played 98 times for the Latics in the Lancashire Combination, scoring 36 goals, and scored a further three goals in 37 appearances in the Cheshire League during his final season at the club.
