= Harry Gee =

English footballer

Personal information
- Date of birth: 25 December 1895
- Place of birth: Haydock, England
- Date of death: 1991 (aged 95 or 96)
- Height: 5 ft 8 in (1.73 m)
- Position: Wing half

Senior career*
Years	Team	Apps	(Gls)
1922–1923	Burnley	5	(0)
1923–1927	New Brighton	87	(7)
1927–1928	Exeter City	29	(2)
- * Club domestic league appearances and goals

Harold "Harry" Gee (25 December 1895 – 1991) was an English professional association footballer from Haydock, Lancashire who played as a wing half.
