= Church of St James the Great, Haydock =

Coordinates: 53.4678°N 2.6595°W

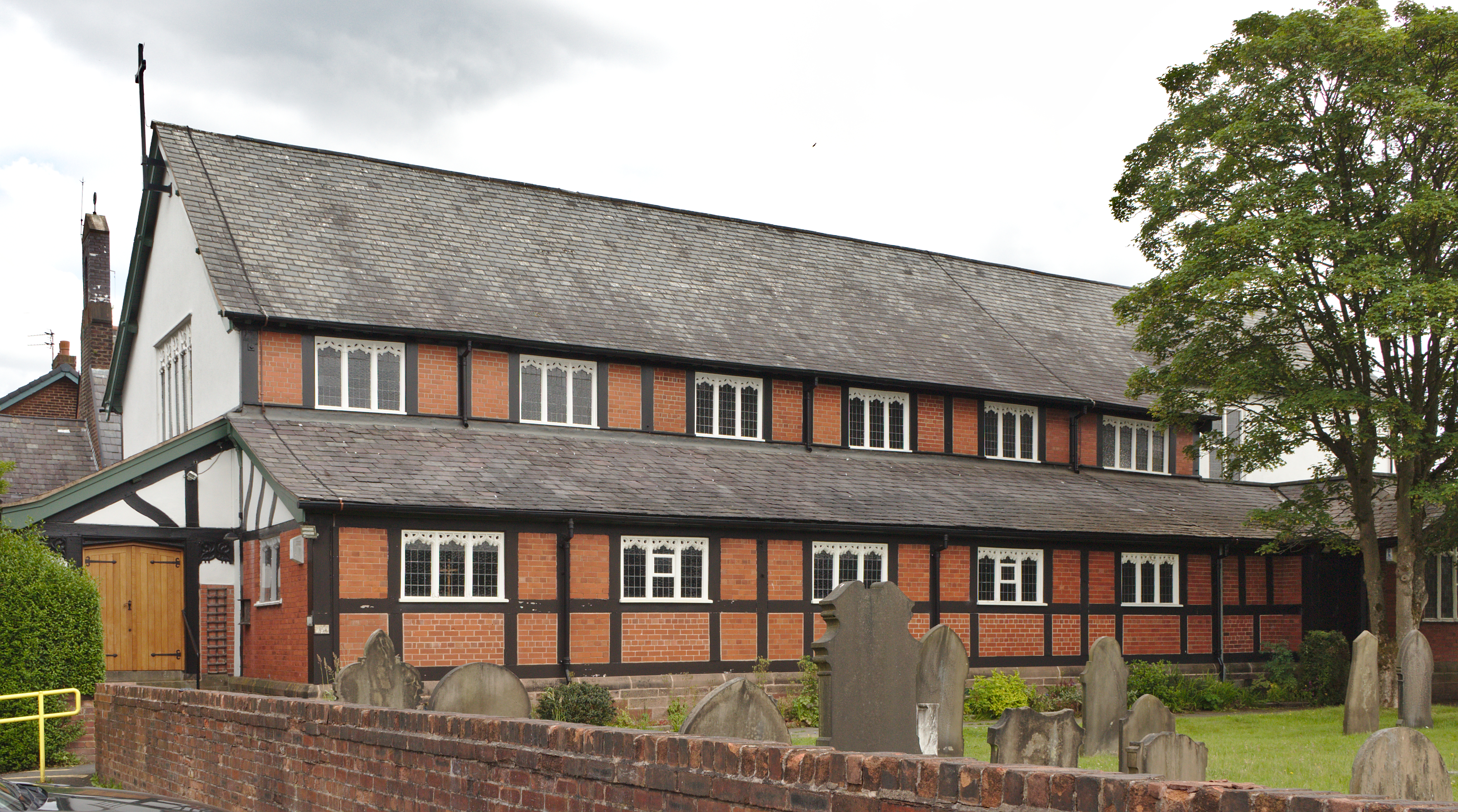

- Location in Merseyside
- OS grid reference: SJ 564,970
- Location: Church Road, Haydock, Metropolitan Borough of St. Helens, Merseyside
- Country: England
- Denomination: Anglican
- Churchmanship: Traditional Catholic

History
- Status: Parish church
- Founded: 1866
- Dedication: St James the Great
- Consecrated: 11 December 1866

Architecture
- Functional status: Active
- Architect(s): W. and J. Hay; Douglas and Fordham
- Architectural type: Church

Specifications
- Materials: Brick, Timber framing with brick nogging

Administration
- Province: York
- Diocese: Liverpool
- Archdeaconry: St. Helens and Warrington
- Deanery: Winwick
- Parish: St James the Great, Haydock

Clergy
- Bishop: The Rt Revd Stephen Race SSC (AEO)
- Vicar: Fr. Michael Vyse SSC

The Church of St James the Great is in Church Road, Haydock, a former mining community, now part of the Metropolitan Borough of St. Helens, Merseyside, in the North-west of England (postcode WA11 0NJ). It is an active Anglican parish church in the Diocese of Liverpool, the Archdeaconry of St. Helens and Warrington and the Deanery of Winwick.

== History ==
Haydock National School was opened on this site in 1837, Church services being conducted in the main classroom by clergy from Ashton. (It now forms a meeting room connecting the Church to the adjacent Vicarage). By 1861 the rising population of Haydock made this provision inadequate. It was hoped to build a large parish church in the centre of the community, but to solve the immediate problem it was decided to build a chapel attached to the School, and connected to it by large double doors. This chapel, the original church, was designed by W. and J. Hay and built by George Harris of St. Helens. It was consecrated on 11 December 1866 . At the laying of the foundation stone the dedication was stated to be to St. Alban, but at the consecration of the building as the Parish Church of the newly founded Parish the dedication was made to St. James the Great.

By 1888 this had become too small for the growing population. Rather than building a new church on another site it was decided to build onto the existing chapel and in 1889 plans were approved for a substantial extension. The foundation stone for this was laid on 5 October 1889 and the newly extended church was opened on 25 July 1891, although it was not consecrated until June 1892. The original church became the Lady chapel of the enlarged church. The extension was designed by Douglas and Fordham. In 1929–31 due to structural problems, the chancel, sanctuary and west wall were rebuilt and the spire was removed. Between 1988 and 1990 the church was reordered, providing a spacious chancel area and a new chapel, The chapel is dedicated to St. Alban,

=== Present day ===
The parish stands in the Traditional Catholic tradition of the Church of England. As it rejects the ordination of women, the parish receives Alternative Episcopal Oversight from the Bishop of Beverley (currently Glyn Webster).

== Architecture and fittings ==
The original church was small and built of brick. It now forms the Lady chapel of the church. The newer part of the church is timber framed with brick nogging on a sandstone plinth. This style was chosen because its flexibility would give protection against possible mining subsidence. The liturgical east end was originally timber framed but this was rebuilt in brick and render in 1929–31. The interior of the church contains much dark-stained oak.

The most striking feature of the Church is the hanging rood dated 1952, designed by Edward Hines of the Warham Guild and carved by Jethro Harris. In the Lady Chapel is a triptych dated 1999 made from icons from the monastery of Barsana in Romania. In St. Alban's Chapel is an icon-style crucifix commissioned from a Romanian artist.

The present organ is on a raised platform over the entrance to the Church. Plaques nearby state that it was originally built by Harrison and Harrison for Lochend United Free Church, Campbeltown, in 1922, being rebuilt and modified for St. James's by David Wells of Liverpool in 1986.

Some photographs of the interior can be found on the church's website stjamesthegreat.org.uk.

== External features ==
The churchyard contains the war graves of eight soldiers of World War I. The Miners' Memorial in the style of a continental wayside cross stands near the entrance to the Church, over the common grave of many of those killed in the Woodpit mining disaster of 1878.

== Activities ==
The church is in the high church tradition of the Church of England and runs services on Sundays and some weekdays, arranges baptisms, weddings and funerals and runs a number of parish groups.

== See also ==
- List of new churches by John Douglas
