= Lowton Church of England High School =

Location
- Newton Road; Lowton; Greater Manchester, WA3 1DU; England
- Coordinates: 53.47561°N 2.54615°W

Information
- Type: Foundation school
- Religious affiliation: Church of England
- Local authority: Wigan Council
- Department for Education URN: 137783 Tables
- Ofsted: Reports
- Headteacher: Jane Galbraith
- Gender: Coeducational
- Age: 11 to 16
- Enrolment: 770 as of January 2023
- Website: https://www.lowtonhs.wigan.sch.uk/

Lowton Church of England High School is a coeducational secondary school located in Lowton in the English county of Greater Manchester.

It is a foundation school administered by Wigan Metropolitan Borough Council. The school became affiliated with the Church of England in 2012 under the guidance of the Diocese of Liverpool. The school educates pupils mainly from Lowton, Golborne, Leigh and Atherton.

Lowton Church of England High School offers GCSEs and some entry level courses as programmes of study for pupils. The school also offers evening adult education and sports facilities to the local community.

Between September 2005 and August 2017, Lowton Church of England High School has been ranked consistently less than good during at least four full inspections by Ofsted.

== Notable former pupils ==
- Lemn Sissay, poet
- Sarah Jayne Dunn, actress
- Katie White, musician
- Heather Frederiksen, Paralympic Games gold medalist
- Jon Clarke Professional Rugby League player
- David Morris, Member of Parliament for Morecambe
- James Grundy, Member of Parliament for Leigh
