= Lowton Churches Romania Appeal =

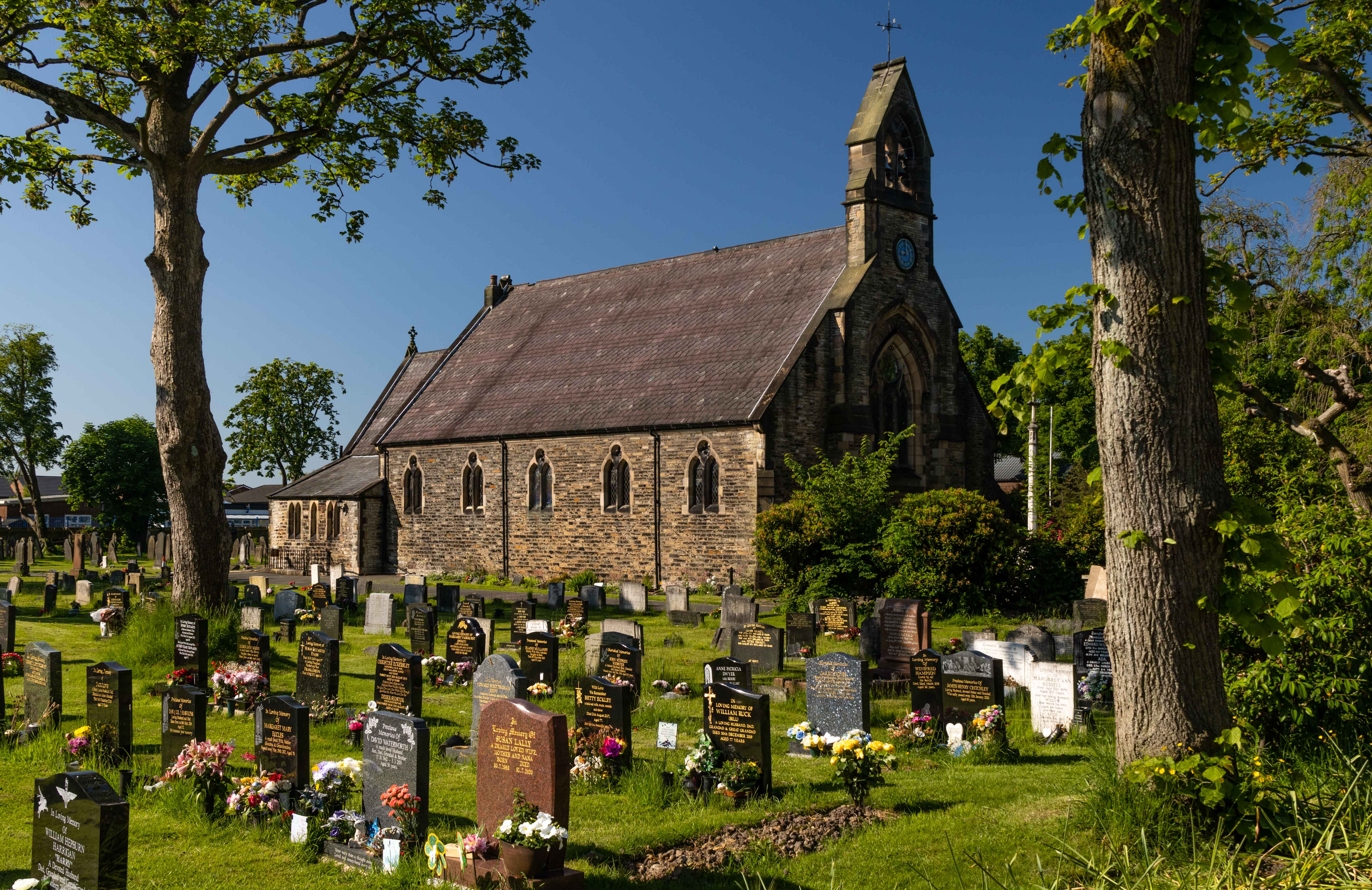
Saint Mary's parish church in Lowton.

Lowton Churches Romania Appeal (LCRA) is a charity set up by the five churches of Lowton, Greater Manchester, England (St Luke's, St Mary's, St Catherine's, Lane Head Methodist, Lowton Independent Methodist) after the fall of Nicolae Ceauşescu in 1990. It grew from the work of an aid trip arranged by the churches after living conditions in the country's orphanages became widely known. The aid trip, which took volunteers from Lowton to Romania by coach, visited an orphanage in Lugoj, west Romania. Those who had participated in the trip decided to form LCRA to deliver ongoing help. More trips to Lugoj and other locations were arranged, but the charity has grown and expanded over time, and now has several ongoing projects in the country.

In 2000 LCRA donated an ambulance to the hospital in the town of Sinaia in memory of James Dickinson, who travelled on many of the charity's aid trips and died in 1999 at the age of 18. In 2003, a second ambulance was donated in memory of another of the charity's workers, Carol Jones.
