= James Twiss =

English footballer

Personal information
- Date of birth: 1897
- Place of birth: Haydock, England
- Date of death: 1961 (aged 63–64)
- Place of death: Haydock, England
- Height: 5 ft 8 in (1.73 m)
- Position: Centre forward

Senior career*
Years	Team	Apps	(Gls)
- Skelmersdale United
1919–1920	Burnley	4	(1)
1920–1922	Wigan Borough	7	(3)
Total		11	(4)
- * Club domestic league appearances and goals

James Twiss (1897–1961) was an English professional footballer who played as a centre forward. He played in The Football League for Burnley and Wigan Borough, and also appeared for Everton as a wartime guest player. He made 11 league appearances altogether, scoring four goals.
