= C. Hamilton Ellis =

English railway writer and painter

- Born: Cuthbert Hamilton Ellis; 29 June 1909
- Died: 29 June 1987 (aged 78)
- Education: Westminster School
- Employer: British Railways
- Known for: Railway painter and author

Cuthbert (Chip) Hamilton Ellis FRSA (29 June 1909 – 29 June 1987) was an English railway writer and painter. He was an Associate of the Institution of Locomotive Engineers and a Fellow of the Royal Society of Arts.

He attended Westminster school and is reported to have briefly been at Oxford. He published the first of his 36 books, mostly on railway subjects, at the age of 21.

During 1940 Ellis was sent to Switzerland by MI6 under the guise of reporting for Modern Transport to organise saboteurs, but is reported not to have made contact with his handlers.

Ellis covered a broad range of railway subjects in his books, the best-known of which is The Trains we Loved (Allen & Unwin, 1947). His obituarist in The Times commented that his Railway Carriages in the British Isles from 1830 to 1914 (1965, revised from an earlier book) "despite its near-obsession with matters lavatorial and ablutory ... was an epoch-making work". As a knowledgeable railwayman he appeared in the 1968 TV documentary 4472: Flying Scotsman and appeared twice in the BBC TV game show Animal, Vegetable, Mineral? in railway themed episodes.

He also wrote a small number of novels, such as The Engineer-Corporal (1940) and Dandy Hart (1947). Both of which were fictional, somewhat "voluble [and] long winded", and deeply based on an interest in railway operations, which was also assumed in the reader.

He had an interest in model railways: his 1962 book Model Railways 1838-1939 was said by The Times to have "led the way in charting the early history of this ... hobby". He was an early member and for some time Vice-President of the Historical Model Railway Society.

His 1959 humorous book Rapidly Round the Bend was described as "[doing] for railways what Sellers [sic] and Yeatman had done for general history" (a reference to the authors of 1066 and All That).

He has paintings in the National Railway Museum, the Royal Logistic Corps Museum and the Museum of Island Railway History on the Isle of Wight. The National Portrait Gallery holds two photographs of him, both taken in the 1960s.

== Publications ==
- C. Hamilton Ellis (1930). Highland Engines and their Work.
- —— (1937–38). Winchester, C. (ed.). Wonders of World Engineering. Articles by Ellis on transport and civil engineering. Amalgamated Press.
- —— (1939). The Grey Men ... Illustrations by Gilbert Dunlop.
- —— (1940). The Engineer-Corporal. A story of the American civil war. Terence Cuneo (illus.).
- —— (1941). Rails across the Ranges.
- —— (1944). Who wrecked the Mail?. Terence Cuneo (illus.).
- —— (1947). The Trains we Loved.
- —— (1947). Dandy Hart. Victor Gollancz.
- —— (1949). Nineteenth Century Railway Carriages in the British Isles. Modern Transport Publishing.
- —— (1949). Some Classic Locomotives.
- —— (1950). Four Main Lines. Allen & Unwin. OCLC 8330303.
- —— (1952). The Beauty of Old Trains.
- —— (1975) [1953]. The Midland Railway. Ian Allan. ISBN 0711005516.
- —— (1956). The South Western Railway. George Allen and Unwin.
- —— (1956). A Picture History Of Railways. Hulton's Picture Histories. Hulton Press.
- —— (1957). Famous locomotives of the world. Globe Books.
- —— (1957). A Picture History of Ships. Hulton.
- —— (1957). Trains and Tractors. Allen & Unwin.
- —— (1958). Twenty locomotive men. Ian Allan.
- —— (1959). The Young George Stephenson. Famous childhood series. William Randell (illus.). Parrish.
- —— (1959). The North British Railway.
- —— (1959). British Railway History. Vol. 1830–1876. Allen & Unwin.
- —— (1959). British Railway History. Vol. 1877–1947. Allen & Unwin.
- C. Hamilton Ellis; John Peter Roberts (1959). Cars and Trains.
- —— (1959). Rapidly Round the Bend. Parrish.
- —— (1960). Royal journey: A retrospect of royal trains in the British Isles. British Transport Commission.
- —— (1960). The Beauty of Railways. Parrish.
- —— (1962). Model Railways 1838-1939. Allen & Unwin. OCLC 8690106.
- —— (1962). Flying Scotsman, 1862-1962. Allen & Unwin. OCLC 4849733.
- —— (1962). Popular Carriage: Two Centuries of Carriage Design for Road and Rail. British Transport Commission.
- —— (1965). The Splendour of Steam. Allen & Unwin. ISBN 0043850162.
- —— (1965). Railway Carriages in the British Isles from 1830 to 1914. Allen & Unwin. ISBN 0043850146.
- C. Hamilton Ellis; H. V. Borley (1966). The History of the Great Northern Railway, 1845-1922.
- —— (1966). Railway history. Dutton Vista.
- —— (1968). The Engines That Passed. Allen & Unwin. ISBN 0043850448.
- —— (1968). The Pictorial Encyclopedia of Railways. Paul Hamlyn.
- —— (1970). London, Midland and Scottish. A Railway in Retrospect. Ian Allan. ISBN 0711000484.
- —— (1971). Perry, George (ed.). King Steam. Selected railway paintings and drawings by C. Hamilton Ellis.
- —— (1972). London, Brighton and South Coast Railway. Allan. ISBN 071100269X.
- —— (1974). Railways : A Pictorial History of the First 150 Years. Peebles Press. ISBN 0856900087.
- —— (1974). Ships : a pictorial history from Noah's Ark to the U.S.S. United States. Peebles Press. ISBN 0856900079.
- —— (1975). British Trains of Yesteryear. Ian Allan. ISBN 0711005494.
- —— (1975). Royal Trains. Routledge & K. Paul. ISBN 0710082932.
- —— (1975). Steam railways. Book Club Associates.
- —— (1977). Railway Art. Ash & Grant. ISBN 0904069109.
- —— (1977). The Lore Of The Train. Nordbok.
