= Historical Model Railway Society =

- Formation: 1950
- Type: Model Railroading
- Headquarters: Midland Railway Centre
- Location: Ripley, Derbyshire, England
- Website: hmrs.org.uk

The Historical Model Railway Society (HMRS) is a British charitable society which supports railway modellers in creating historically accurate models. To this end it collects, preserves and makes available documents, drawings, photographs and other records, covering the period from the early 19th century to the present.

== History ==
Founded in 1950, the Historical Model Railway Society registered as a charitable incorporated organisation in March 2016, having previously been a registered charity since 1977. The founding president was the influential railway official and historian, George Dow.

One of its early members, and for some time its Vice-President, was the railway writer and artist C. Hamilton Ellis, whose 1962 book Model Railways 1838–1939 was said by The Times to have "led the way in charting the early history of this ... hobby".

== Location ==
The Historical Model Railway Society has a purpose-built building at the Swanwick Junction site of the Midland Railway – Butterley, where its collections can be viewed at certain times. The Society's collections, providing information for both railfans and model railroaders, include over 200,000 photographs (50,000 of which are available in the Society's online catalogue as of December 2017), 300,000 drawings, and a large and varied collection of railway documents including working documents, railway timetables, model catalogues and enthusiasts' documentation. Five of the paintings held in the Society's collection are listed in the Art UK database.

== Publications ==
The Historical Model Railway Society publishes the HMRS Journal on a quarterly basis; according to the Society, the Journal "aims to be one of scholarly record and publishes prime source material as well as items of debate and research."
