= Lowton =

Village in Metropolitan Borough of Wigan

Coordinates: 53.471°N 2.569°W

- Village
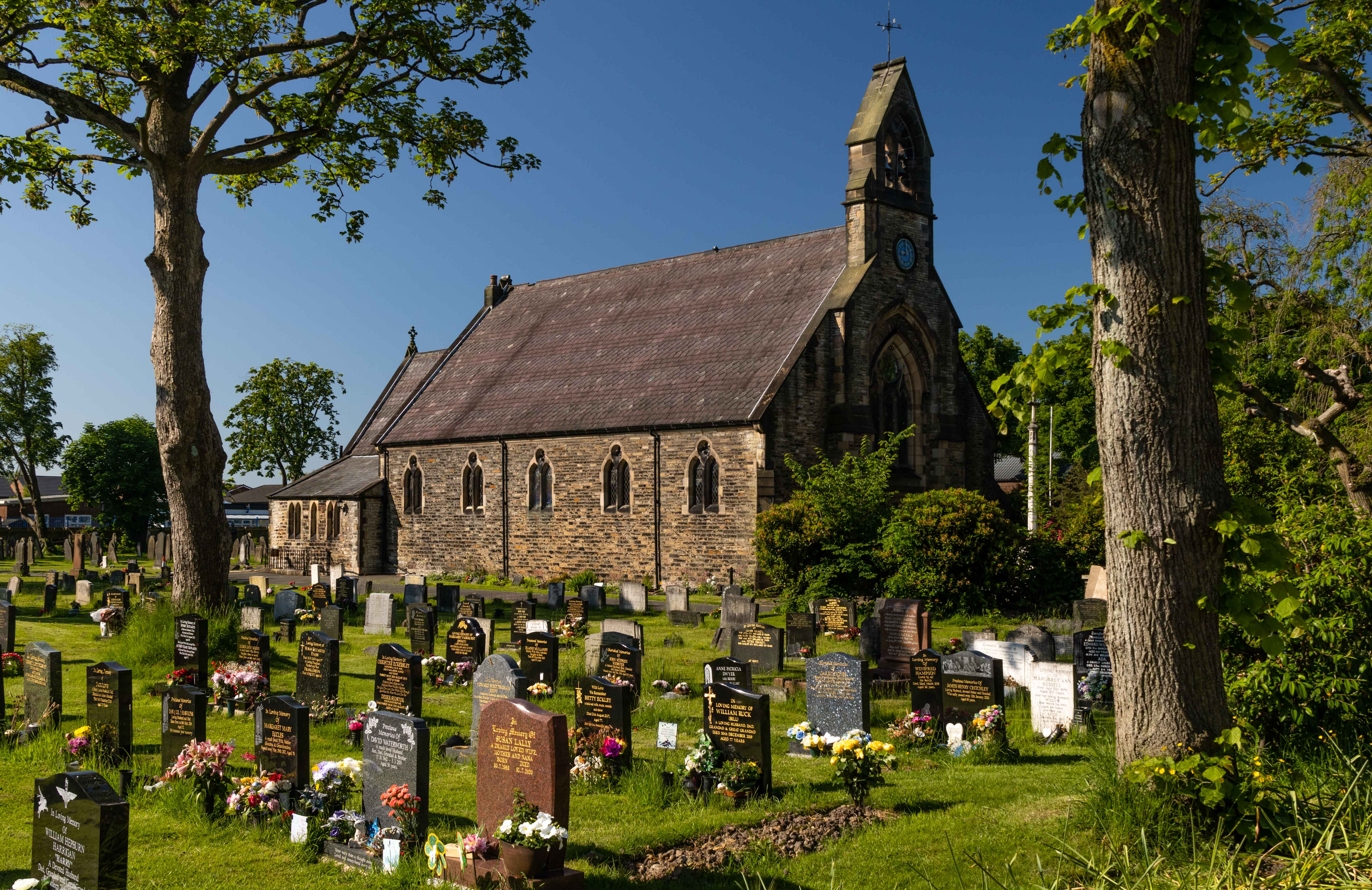
- St Mary's Parish Church, Lowton

- Location within Greater Manchester
- Population: 14,605 (2011)
- OS grid reference: SJ622973
- Metropolitan borough: Wigan
- Metropolitan county: Greater Manchester
- Region: North West
- Country: England
- Sovereign state: United Kingdom
- Post town: WARRINGTON
- Postcode district: WA3
- Dialling code: 01942; 01925
- Police: Greater Manchester
- Fire: Greater Manchester
- Ambulance: North West
- UK Parliament: Leigh and Atherton

Lowton is a village within the Metropolitan Borough of Wigan, in Greater Manchester, England. It is around 2 miles (3 km) from Leigh, 7 miles (11 km) south of Wigan and 12 miles (19 km) west of Manchester city centre. The settlement lies across the A580 East Lancashire Road.

Within the boundaries of the historic county of Lancashire, Lowton's history is closely connected with Byrom Manor, the ancestral home of the Byroms, a family which included poet John Byrom, the inventor of a system of shorthand. During the Industrial Revolution Lowton was associated with coal mining and manufacturing: it was close to several collieries and factories.

At the 2011 census, the population of Lowton was split between two wards: Lowton East, and Golborne and Lowton West. The latter partially counted the entire population of Golborne, and partially the population of Lowton's western half, with the boundary between them roughly being at Scott Road to the north and Windsor Road to the south.

== History ==
Lowton has an unclear toponymy: the second element is from Old English tun "farm, village" with an uncertain first element. (It is suggested that the first element is from hlāw, an old English word for hill: Wornoth Low near Stockport is the highest hill in the area, and Lowton is the highest point locally.) A record of the name as Liewetune in 1176 suggests Old English hleowe "lee", although this is not a certain etymology.

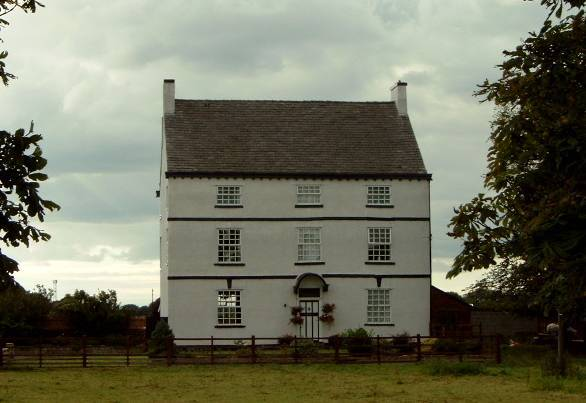
Byrom Hall, ancestral home of the Byrom family

Lowton was one of the berewicks of the royal manor of Newton, later being one of the members of the Barony of Makerfield. Byrom Manor, later to feature the ancestral home of the poet John Byrom which was built in the 18th century, is recorded as early as 1212; the family prospered there for centuries. Byrom Hall at one time featured a moat.

The Hare and Hounds public house, built in the 17th century, was once used as a place to hold trials of local criminals, including murders. The Lowton stocks can still be found today nearby at St Luke’s Parish Church and are Grade II listed.

The former Lowton railway station was used as a resting point for the royal train. Lowton had a second station – Lowton St Mary's – which closed in 1964.

Lowton had a toffee factory, along with other sites of heavy industry. Many of these factories have now closed and have been replaced with light industry.

Lowton's Sandy Lane is reputedly haunted by the ghost of Joshua Rigby, a local farmer who died in 1883.

== Governance and politics ==
In 1931 the civil parish had a population of 4584. On 1 October 1933 the parish was abolished and merged with Golborne.

Between 1894 and 1974, Lowton was part of the Golborne Urban District, in the administrative county of Lancashire. In 1974 as part of the local government reorganisation enacted in the Local Government Act 1972 it became part of Greater Manchester with the boundary at Newton-le-Willows marking the edge of the new county of Merseyside.

Lowton is within the constituency of Leigh & Atherton and is represented in parliament by the Labour MP Jo Platt.

Locally, the area is represented on Wigan Council by three Labour councillors, Garry Lloyd, Jenny Gregory and Mike Smith.

== Transport ==
Situated on the A580 East Lancashire Road, the village has direct access to the cities of Manchester to the east and Liverpool to the west. From this road, the M6 motorway runs north and south, and the M60 connects with the M62 across the Pennines. Also, the M61 can be reached via the A579. The nearest railway station is Newton-le-Willows on the Chester–Manchester line and Liverpool–Manchester line. Public transport in Lowton is co-ordinated by Transport for Greater Manchester and is served by buses to Manchester, Wigan, Leigh, Newton-le-Willows and St Helens. Buses: 35 Bryn/Leigh-Manchester (Bee Network), 34 St Helens-Leigh (Arriva Merseyside), 610 Leigh-Wigan (Bee Network).

== Environment ==
To the south of Lowton is Highfield Moss, part of which has been designated a Site of Special Scientific Interest. The 52.6 acres (21.3 ha) site was designated in 1986 for its biological interest. It is predominantly notable as a mire community and it is the best example in Greater Manchester.

The British Hedgehog Preservation Society operates a hedgehog rescue operation in Lowton, from where several hedgehogs have been rehomed at RHS Bridgewater in nearby Salford.

== Education ==
- Lowton Church of England High School
- Lowton Primary School
- Lowton St. Marys Primary School (Church of England)
- Lowton West Primary School
- St. Catherine of Siena Catholic Primary School
- St. Lukes Church of England Primary School
- Gilded Hollins Primary School

== Religion ==
In 1635 the Puritan clergyman, Richard Mather, and his family left for New England as a result of religious intolerance.

Lowton's churches include the two Church of England churches of St Mary's and St Luke's; Lowton Independent Methodist, a member of the Independent Methodist Connexion; and Lowton Community Church. Lane Head Methodist church closed in 2010. The Roman Catholic church of St Catherine of Siena closed in 2011 after a safety inspection revealed problems with the electrical system, and the building was demolished in 2017.

The churches in Lowton organise some joint activities including ecumenical services. Their charity work has included the Lowton Churches Romania Appeal, formed after the collapse of the Communist regime in Romania in 1990. It supported an orphanage in Lugoj but its remit has since expanded to include several projects in the country.

=== St Luke's ===
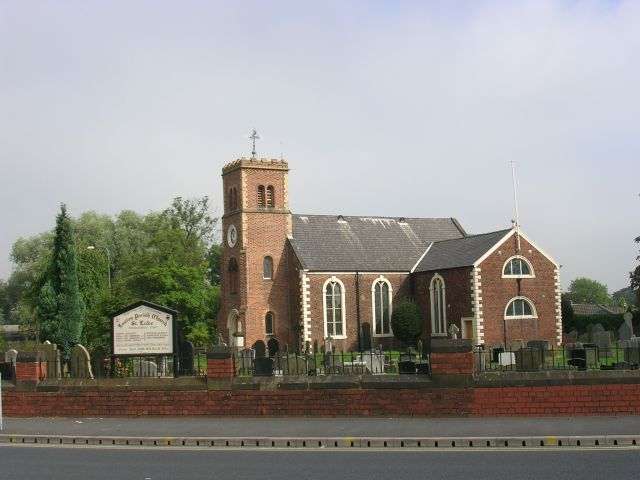
St Lukes' parish church

A date of 1732 on the church door suggests that the building was completed that year. The Chapel was consecrated on 18 October 1733, St Luke's Day, by the Bishop of Chester. The chapel and chapel yard were built on land given by Hugh Stirrup, a yeoman of Lowton. Although the Deed of Consecration allowed for all the regular church services and sacraments, the chapel was not yet a parish church and thus no burials were permitted. The parish registers were stored at Winwick.

Today many of the chapel pews still bear metal plates showing the names of their original owners. The oldest, pew No. 1, has a plate for Edward Byrom dated 1732. Other plates bear the surnames Green, Kenyon, Leigh, Lowe, Mather, Pierpoint, Tyler, and Worsley.

== Sport and organisations ==
Lowton is well known for its community darts, as seen on tiktok. A darts league has been established for a number of years, and games are currently played at Lowton Social Club. Lowton is also the location for Golborne Sports and Social Club which participates in local football, hockey, bowls and cricket leagues. Other nearby sports teams include Golborne Parkside RLFC, Leigh RUFC and Leigh United FC.

== Media ==
Lowton falls inside the circulation areas of these newspapers and websites:

- Wigan Evening Post
- Wigan Reporter
- Leigh Reporter
- Leigh Journal
- Manchester Evening News

== Notable people ==
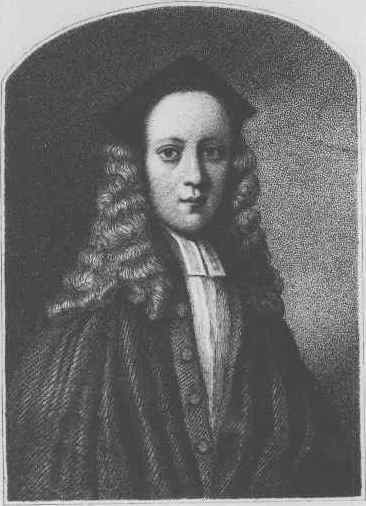
John Byrom

- Richard Mather (1596–1669), American Congregational clergyman, born in Lowton
- John Byrom (1692–1763), English poet, at times lived at Byrom Hall, Slag Lane
- Sir Thomas Berridge (1857–1924), politician and solicitor, MP for Warwick and Leamington 1906/1910
- Fred Hollingsworth (1917-2015), British-Canadian architect, born in Lowton
- Stephen Hesford (born 1957), politician and barrister, MP for Wirral West from 1997 to 2010
- James Grundy (born 1978), MP for Leigh, 2019 / 2024, lived on local farm since birth
- Katie White (born 1983), singer with pop group The Ting Tings, brought up on a farm in Slag Lane, Lowton

=== Sport ===
- Jimmy Prescott (1930–2011), footballer, played 223 games including 135 for Wigan Athletic
- Clayton Blackmore (born 1964), footballer, played 489 games, including 186 for Manchester United and 36 for Wales
- Jon Clarke (born 1979), former rugby league player, played 359 games including 234 for Warrington Wolves
- Luke Adamson (born 1987), former rugby league footballer, played 313 games beginning with 145 with the Salford Red Devils
- Ben Currie (born 1994), rugby league footballer, played 275 games for Warrington Wolves
