= George Dow =

Railway mapper and historian (1907–1987)

George Dow (30 June 1907 – 28 January 1987) was a British employee of the London and North Eastern Railway (LNER) and British Railways known for his public relations work and railway maps produced for his employers, and also a writer of railway literature, in particular his three-volume history of the Great Central Railway.

== Biography ==
George Dow joined London and North Eastern Railway (LNER) as a grade five clerk at Kings Cross railway station in London, England. He held many offices on the LNER (particularly as Press Relations Officer throughout the Second World War) and British Railways.

He is perhaps best known as a draughtsman for his diagrammatic railway maps for the LNER and London, Midland and Scottish Railway and as an inspiration to the celebrated designer Harry Beck on the tube map. Their work led to a style of design which has revolutionised the world of urban rail and metro maps.

On the creation of British Railways in 1948, he was appointed Public Relations and Publicity Officer for the Eastern and North Eastern Regions. In 1949 he took the same post at the larger London Midland Region. He rose to Divisional Manager, Birmingham, and later Stoke-on-Trent, and retired in 1968.

He also wrote twenty-one railway histories, starting with studies for the LNER, and later including his three-volume history of the Great Central Railway and a two-volume work on the carriages of the Midland Railway.

He was the founding President of the Model Engineering Trade Association in 1944, and of the Historical Model Railway Society in 1950.

He died on 28 January 1987 aged 79 years.

== Bibliography ==
- The Third Woodhead Tunnel. British Railways (London Midland Region). 1954.
- Great Central. Loco. Publishing Co., London., 3 Volumes
  - The Progenitors, 1813–1863. Vol. 1. 1959.
  - Dominion of Watkin, 1864–1899. Vol. 2. 1962.
  - Fay Sets the Pace, 1900–1922. Vol. 3. 1965.

Republished by Ian Allan 1985: Vol.1 ISBN 0-7110-1468-X ; Vol.2 ISBN 0-7110-1469-8 ; Vol.3 ISBN 0-7110-0263-0

A fuller bibliography is given in: "George Dow & son". SteamIndex.
