= St Helens Central railway station (Great Central Railway) =

Former railway station in England

St Helens Central
- Station frontage on opening day

General information
- Location: St Helens, St Helens; England
- Coordinates: 53.4553°N 2.7371°W
- Grid reference: SJ511956
- Platforms: 1

Other information
- Status: Disused

History
- Original company: Liverpool, St Helens and South Lancashire Railway
- Pre-grouping: Great Central Railway
- Post-grouping: London and North Eastern Railway

Key dates
- 3 January 1900: Station opened as Great Central Railways Central Station
- 1 March 1949: Renamed St Helens Central
- 3 March 1952: Station closed to passengers
- 4 January 1965: Station closed completely
Location

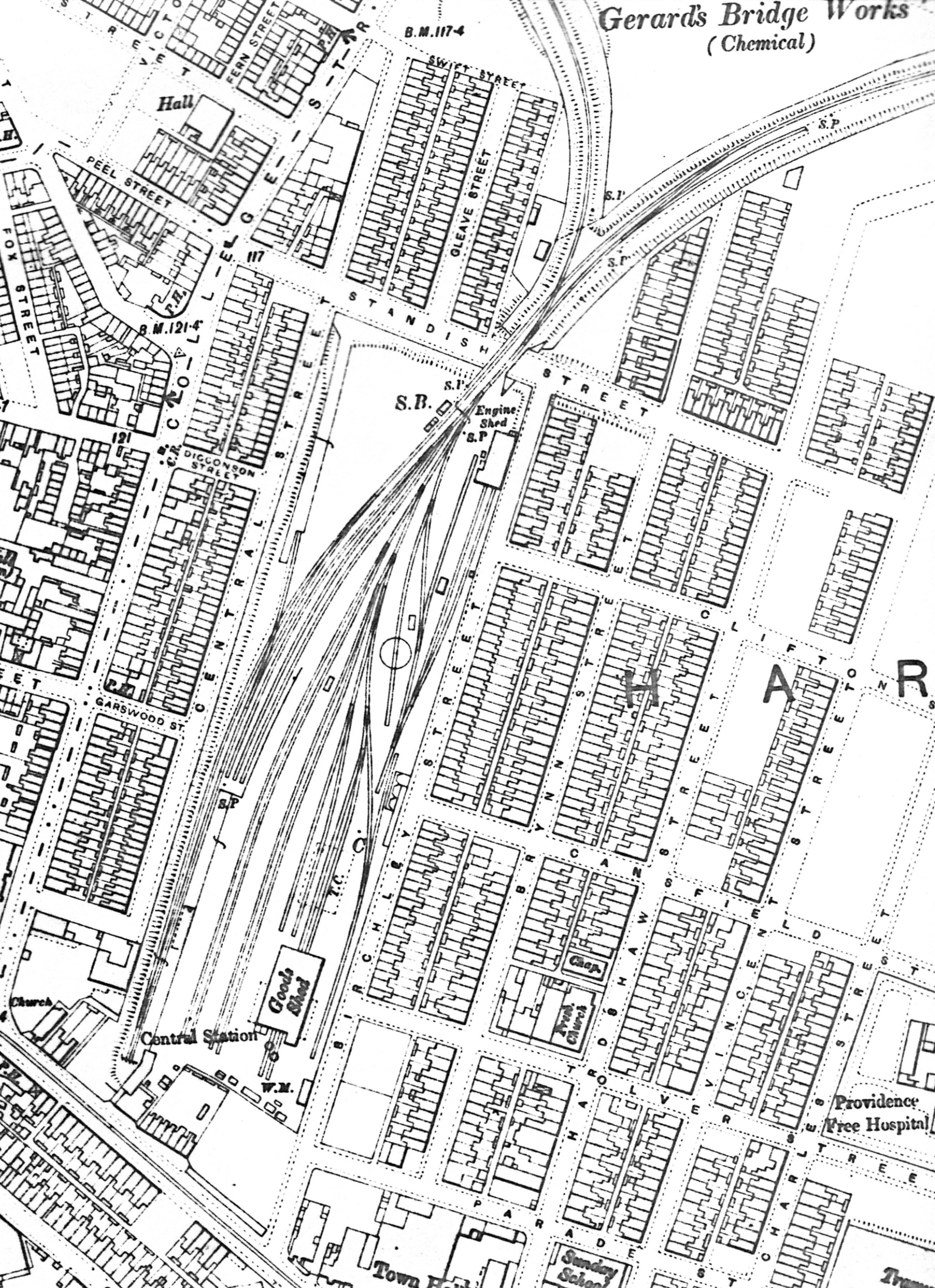
1908 OS Map showing St. Helens Central (GCR) Station & Goods Yard

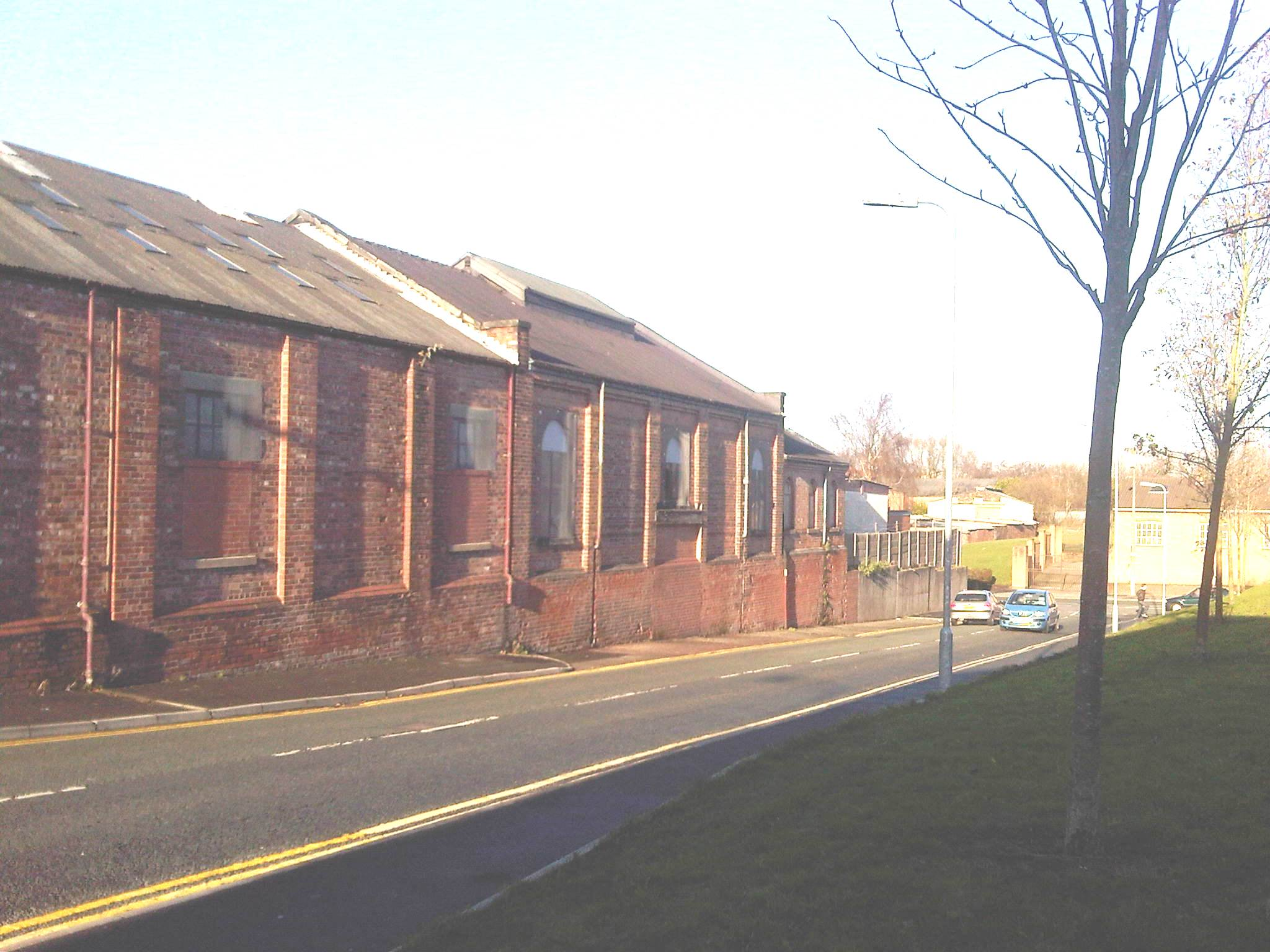
Former Engine Shed, now end part of factory building. Note smoke louvres

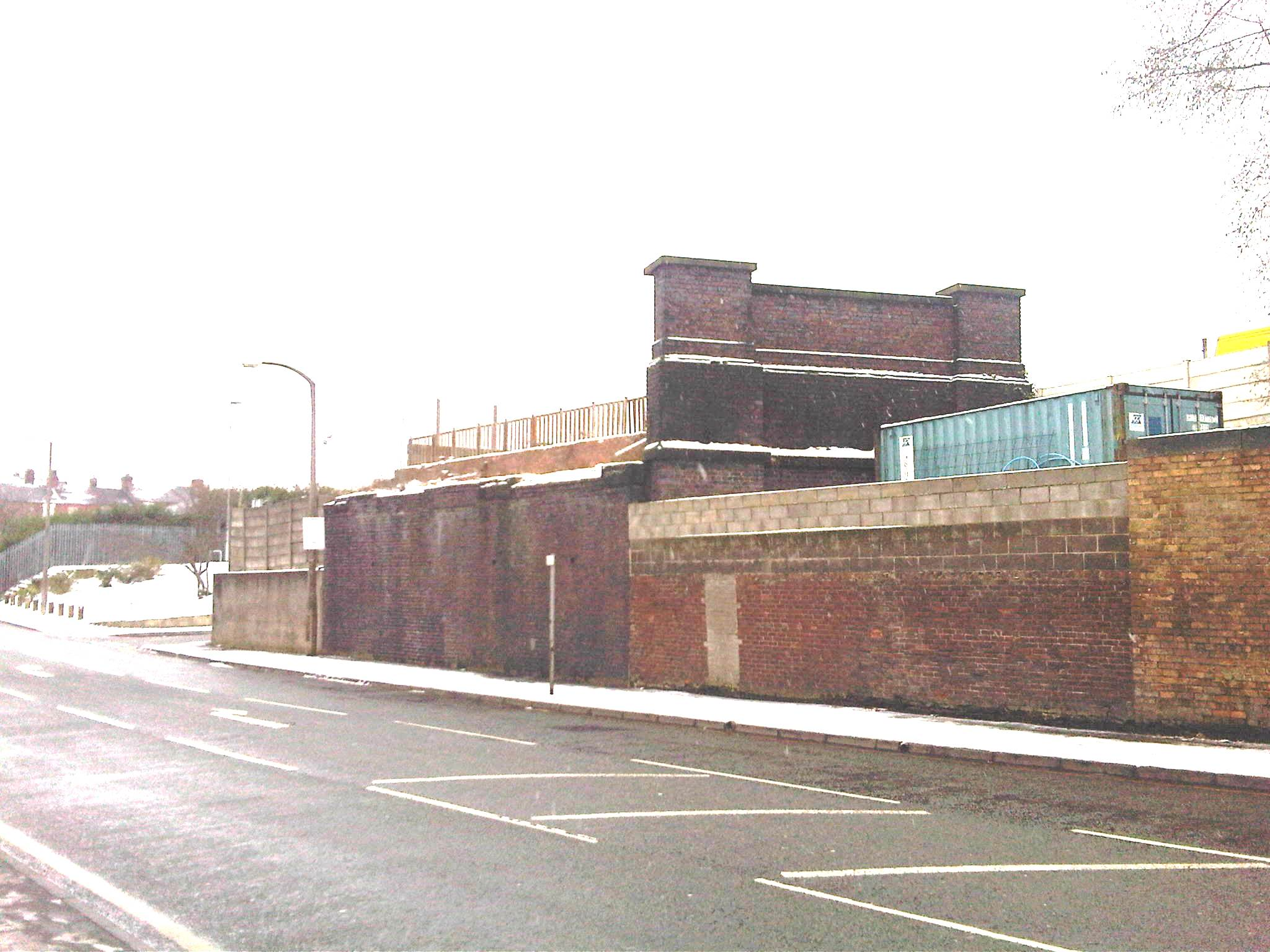
Remains of Standish Street bridge which carried the rail link from Lowton St. Mary's into the terminus at St. Helens

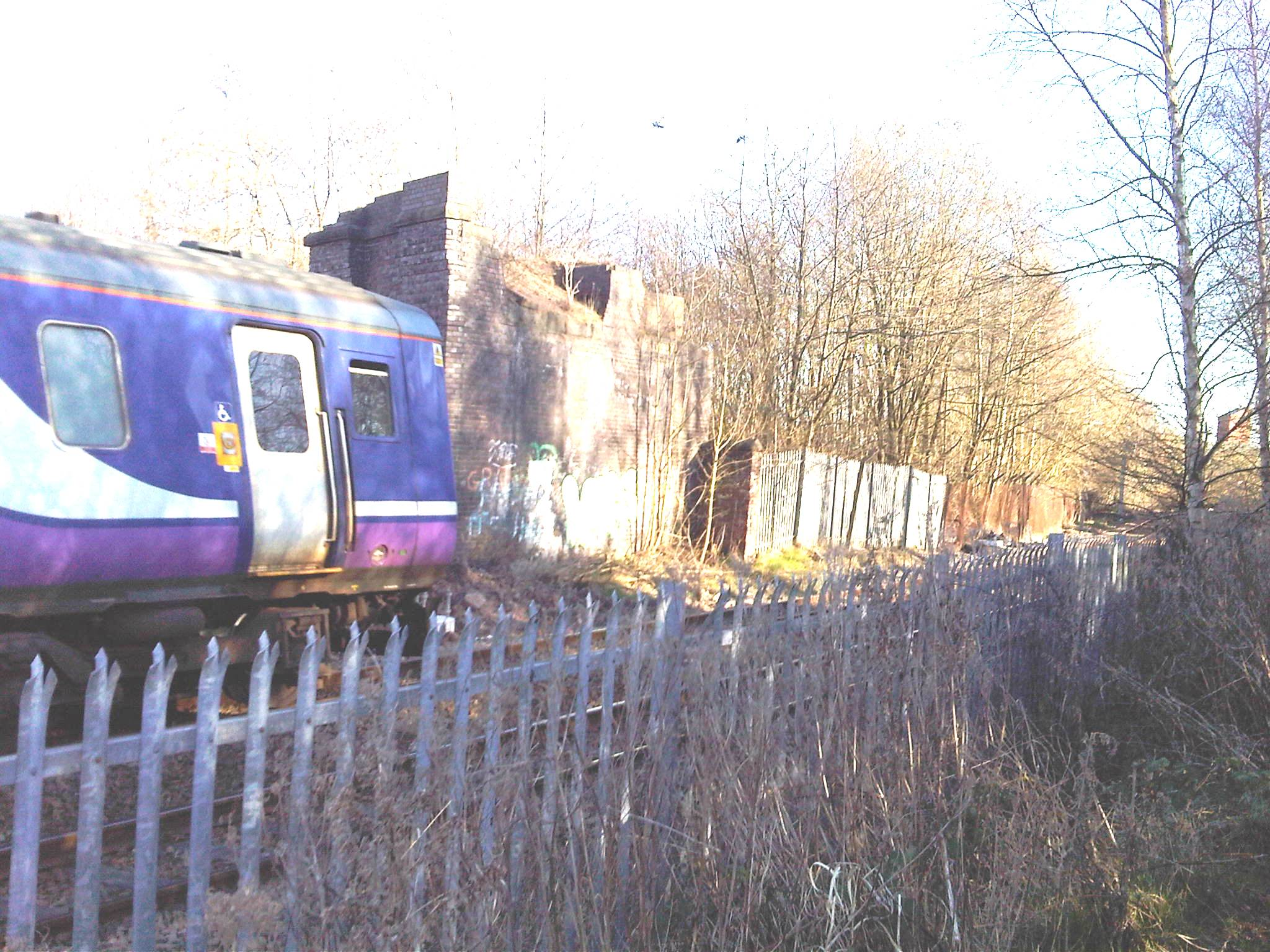
Liverpool - Wigan Merseyrail City Line (ex-LNWR) Northern Rail Sprinter DMU passes underneath pier remnants of St. Helens GCR viaduct at Pocket Nook just east of the station.

St Helens Central (GCR) railway station served the town of St Helens, England with passenger traffic between 1900 and 1952 and goods traffic until 1965. It was the terminus of a branch line from Lowton St Mary's.

== History ==
The Liverpool, St Helens and South Lancashire Railway, which ran from a junction with the Wigan Junction Railways (WJR) to the north of Lowton St Mary's, opened for goods and mineral traffic in 1895, but passenger services did not commence until January 1900. The formal opening was on 2 January with public services beginning the following day, being operated by the Great Central Railway, which was already operating the WJR. Most services ran through to Manchester Central. The station opened with the commencement of public passenger services on 3 January 1900 and was originally named St Helens.

Overall, the station and goods facilities covered 8 acres (3.2 ha), however the passenger section only consisted of one platform with a somewhat rudimentary wooden canopy shelter (compared to the brick-built booking office). This was in stark contrast to the comprehensive goods sidings, weighbridge, travelling crane and large goods shed. Rail access to this complex was from the north-eastern corner via a double track bridge over Standish Street. The line then divided into two, the northern branch proceeding into Pilkington's Cowley Hill Plate Glass Works being purely for goods traffic, the other line running to the east. This crossed the LNWR line at Pocket Nook on a single line viaduct. It was originally intended to be double track, but due to difficulties in obtaining sufficient land and clearances plus rising costs, the viaduct was eventually forced to be completed as a single line structure.

Similar financial considerations caused the line to terminate at St. Helens. The original plan was for the line to continue westwards towards Liverpool via proposed stations at Dentons Green, Knowsley and Croxteth Park to a junction with the CLC Lines at Fazakerley, from which point there would be easy access to both Southport and Liverpool.

The station was renamed St Helens Central on 1 March 1949 but closed to passenger traffic three years later on 3 March 1952. It continued to be used for goods until 4 January 1965, when it closed completely. In 1987 this name was given to St Helens Shaw Street station on the Liverpool–Wigan line of the former London and North Western Railway.

== Services ==
In 1922 six "down" (towards St Helens) trains called at the station, on Mondays to Saturdays. These called at all stations from Manchester Central to St Helens via Glazebrook and Culcheth. No trains called on Sundays.

By 1948 four trains plied between St Helens Central and Manchester Central, calling at all stations, Monday to Friday, reduced to three on Saturdays. No trains called on Sundays.

A fuller selection of public and working timetables has now been published. Among other things this suggests that Sunday services ran until 1914, but had ceased by 1922 never to return.

From 1952 until 5 October 1963 some race day specials to Haydock Park had deposited their passengers at the racecourse then travelled to St Helens for servicing, turning and to await their turn to return in the evening. Others appear to have done the same at Ashton-in-Makerfield.

Enthusiasts' railtours travelled the line on 29 September 1956 and 21 September 1963.

=== Remaining structures ===
Nothing remains of the station; a wall section of the bridge at Standish Street is still in existence, as is the engine shed - however for many years this has been part of a factory building. Sections of heavily overgrown viaduct abutments and piers further east still remain but as for the immediate station, goods yard, booking office, signal box, turntable and track, these are long since gone, having been replaced by a large car park, Police station, offices and court buildings.

Preceding station	Disused railways	Following station
Terminus	Great Central Railway; Liverpool, St Helens and South Lancashire Railway	Haydock; Line and station closed

== Notes ==
=== Sources ===
- Bradshaw, George (1985) [July 1922]. Bradshaw's General Railway and Steam Navigation guide for Great Britain and Ireland: A reprint of the July 1922 issue. Newton Abbot: David & Charles. ISBN 978-0-7153-8708-5. OCLC 12500436.
- Butt, R. V. J. (October 1995). The Directory of Railway Stations: details every public and private passenger station, halt, platform and stopping place, past and present (1st ed.). Sparkford: Patrick Stephens Ltd. ISBN 978-1-85260-508-7. OCLC 60251199. OL 11956311M.
- Dow, George (1985) [1962]. Great Central, Volume Two: Dominion of Watkin 1864–1899. Shepperton: Ian Allan. ISBN 978-0-7110-1469-5. OCLC 655324061.
- Dow, George (1985) [1965]. Great Central, Volume Three: Fay Sets the Pace, 1900–1922. Shepperton: Ian Allan. ISBN 978-0-7110-0263-0. OCLC 500447049.
- Gilbert, A.C.; Knight, N.R. (1975). Railways Around Lancashire, a Pictorial Survey. Castleton, Greater Manchester: Manchester Transport Museum Society. ISBN 978-0-900857-09-6.
- Jowett, Alan (2000). Jowett's Nationalised Railway Atlas (1st ed.). Penryn, Cornwall: Atlantic Transport Publishers. ISBN 978-0-906899-99-1. OCLC 228266687.
- Pixton, Bob (1996). Widnes and St. Helens Railways. Stroud: Chalford Publishing Co. ISBN 978-0-7524-0751-7.
- Shannon, Paul; Hillmer, John (2003). British Railways Past and Present, Manchester and South Lancashire No 41. Kettering: Past & Present Publishing Ltd. ISBN 978-1-85895-197-3.
- Smith, Paul; Turner, Keith (2012), Railway Atlas Then and Now, Shepperton: Ian Allan Publishing, ISBN 978-09550030-6-6
- Suggitt, Gordon (2004). Lost Railways of Merseyside and Greater Manchester. Newbury: Countryside Books. ISBN 978-1-85306-869-0.
- Sweeney, Dennis J (2014). The St. Helens and Wigan Junction Railway. Leigh: Triangle Publishing. ISBN 978-0-85361-292-6.
- Tolson, J.M. (1982). St. Helens railway : its rivals and successors. Usk: Oakwood Press. ISBN 978-0-85361-292-6.
- Townley, C H A; Peden, J A (1999), Industrial Railways of St Helens, Widnes and Warrington, Part 1 St Helens, Guisborough: Industrial Railway Society, ISBN 978-1-901556-10-0
- Welbourn, Nigel (2008). Liverpool and the Mersey (Lost Lines). Shepperton: Ian Allan. ISBN 978-0-7110-3190-6.
- Wright, Paul (20 April 2010). "Disused Stations: St. Helens Central Station".
