= Liverpool, St Helens and South Lancashire Railway =

Overview
- Status: closed
- Locale: North West England

Technical
- Track gauge: 1,435 mm (4 ft 8 1/2 in) standard gauge

The Liverpool, St Helens and South Lancashire Railway, was formed in 1889, but no services ran until 1895 and then only freight. Passenger services did not start until 1900. It incorporated the St Helens and Wigan Junction Railway. It was taken over by the Great Central Railway in 1906.

== History ==
St. Helens and Wigan Junction Railway Act 1885
- Act of Parliament
- Parliament of the United Kingdom
- Long title: An Act for authorising the construction of a Railway in Lancashire to be called the St. Helens and Wigan Junction Railway and for other purposes.
- Citation: 48 & 49 Vict. c. cxxi

Dates
- Royal assent: 22 July 1885

Text of statute as originally enacted

St. Helens and Wigan Junction Railway Act 1886
- Act of Parliament
- Parliament of the United Kingdom
- Long title: An Act to empower the St. Helens and Wigan Junction Railway Company to make new Railways and for other purposes.
- Citation: 50 Vict. c. xxxiii

Dates
- Royal assent: 25 September 1886

Text of statute as originally enacted

St. Helens and Wigan Junction Railway Act 1889
- Act of Parliament
- Parliament of the United Kingdom
- Long title: An Act to revive the powers and extend the time for the compulsory purchase of lands for, and to extend the time for the construction of certain authorised railways, to change the name of the St. Helens and Wigan Junction Railway Company, to amend the provisions of the Company's Acts, and to confer further powers upon the Company and others and for other purposes.
- Citation: 52 & 53 Vict. c. xci

Dates
- Royal assent: 26 July 1889

Text of statute as originally enacted

Liverpool, St. Helens and South Lancashire Railway Act 1891
- Act of Parliament
- Parliament of the United Kingdom
- Long title: An Act to extend the time for the compulsory purchase of lands for certain railways authorised by the St Helens and Wigan Junction Railway Act 1885 and the St Helens and Wigan Junction Railway Act 1886 and to provide for the issue of preference or guaranteed shares or stock and for other purposes.
- Citation: 54 & 55 Vict. c. cxv

Dates
- Royal assent: 21 July 1891

Text of statute as originally enacted

The railway was incorporated by the St. Helens and Wigan Junction Railway Act 1885 (48 & 49 Vict. c. cxxi) and the St. Helens and Wigan Junction Railway Act 1886 (50 Vict. c. xxxiii) to enable the construction of a line from St Helens to Lowton (eight miles) and St Helens to Liverpool (ten miles). The lines had share capital of £210,000 and £340,000 respectively. In 1887 a prospectus was published inviting subscriptions for the full 550,000 pounds. The first sod was cut on 25 January 1888 by the Earl of Derby on the site of what became St Helens Central railway station (Great Central Railway). In July 1889, the St. Helens and Wigan Junction Railway Act 1889 (52 & 53 Vict. c. xci) extended the completion time until July 1893. The opening ceremony took place on 2 January 1900.

The original intention was to connect to the Cheshire Lines Committee North Liverpool Extension Line at Fazakerley junction, to form a route to Huskisson Dock and Southport, but nothing ever came of the scheme west of St Helens.

Henry Seton-Karr was chairman of the railway both at the time of the 1887 prospectus and at its opening. In 1888, the railway`s solicitor was Robert William Perks.

== Route ==
The line ran from St Helens Central (GCR) railway station to Lowton St Mary's.

== Closure ==
The line closed to passengers in 1952. It was reduced in stages as freight traffic ebbed and flowed. The key milestones were:

- 1965 line closed and lifted west of Lowton Metals, Ashton (inclusive).
- 1968 line reinstated west of Lowton Metals to serve a new oil depot at Haydock
- 1968 new "Haydock Branch Curve" built to connect the line to the WCML north of Golborne
- 1968 line east of the new connection closed and lifted (the bridge over the WCML was removed in 1971)
- 1975 passenger trains ran to five race meetings, using Ashton station, experiment not repeated
- 1983 Haydock oil depot traffic lost to road, line cut back to Lowton Metals, Haydock.
- 1987 Lowton Metals ceased trading, line cut back to Golborne Colliery headshunt
- 1987 Kelbit opened rail-served business at Edge Green, using trackbed of Edge Green Colliery branch
- 1989 Golborne Colliery closed, line cut back to headshunt for the Kelbit traffic
- after 2000 the Kelbit site was taken over by Hanson as their "Ashton" plant
- In 2011 the site was purchased by PF Jones Ltd and began work to restore the Kelbit rail line

In 2015 very occasional trains still served the Hanson plant.

On 7 March 2015 an enthusiasts' excursion titled "Sabrina's Tea Train" traversed the line.

A quarter-mile headshunt which ends at bufferstops approx 50 yards east of Bridge 13 over Edge Green Lane is the sole remaining section of the original route in use.

== Re-opening ==
After purchasing the land surrounding the line at Edge Green in 2011, PF Jones Ltd worked with Hansons to restore the Kelbit line off the Haydock Branch Curve. The Kelbit line was reopened in 2018 and is used by Heidelberg (formerly Hanson) to transfer raw materials from Shap Quarry, Cumbria to distribute across the north west.

Between and Golborne and Glazebrook High Speed 2 proposed use of an alignment similar to the disused line in Phase 2b. This "Golborne Link" was removed from HS2 plans before the northern leg was abandoned by the Conservative government in 2023.
