= Lowton St Mary's railway station =

Former railway station in England

Lowton St Mary's

General information
- Location: Lowton, Warrington; England
- Coordinates: 53.4733°N 2.5556°W
- Grid reference: SJ633975
- Platforms: 2

Other information
- Status: Disused

History
- Original company: Wigan Junction Railways
- Pre-grouping: Great Central Railway
- Post-grouping: London and North Eastern Railway

Key dates
- 1 April 1884: Station opened
- 2 November 1964: Station closed to passengers
- 1968: Station closed completely
Location

Lowton St Mary's railway station served the scattered community of Lowton, then in Lancashire, now in Greater Manchester, England. It was situated immediately south of the A572 bridge over the tracks.

== History ==
The station opened on 1 April 1884 along with six other stations on the Wigan Junction Railways (WJR), which was backed by the Manchester, Sheffield and Lincolnshire Railway (MS&LR). One source gives the station's early name as plain "Lowton", but the Bradshaws of April 1884 and July 1922 both use "Lowton St Mary's". 19th Century Lowton, like Langwith in Derbyshire, was a scattered rural area rather than one village, with communities having related names, such as Lowton St Mary's and Lowton Common as well as the plain Lowton. A photograph of a train at the station in Great Central days shows a station nameboard bearing the wording "Lowton St Mary's".

The Manchester, Sheffield and Lincolnshire Railway changed its name in 1897 to the Great Central Railway (GCR). The GCR absorbed the WJR on 1 January 1906.

The WJR line ran through Lancashire from Glazebrook West Junction to Wigan Central but was also a part of the bigger MS&LR/GCR network and therefore trains were originally provided by the MS&LR.

In 1895 goods services began on a wholly new line which branched westwards off the WJR a short distance north of Lowton St Mary's station. This line was built by the Liverpool, St Helens and South Lancashire Railway, a subsidiary of the Great Central Railway. That line was part of an ambitious project to reach the north Liverpool docks, but only ever made it as far as St Helens Central (GCR). The first recorded passenger train ran on that line in 1899, a race day special to Haydock Park Racecourse. The full, but sparse, passenger service began on 3 January 1900.

== Services ==
In April 1884 there were seven trains in each direction per day, all running between Manchester Central railway station and Wigan Central. Of these, six called at Lowton St Mary's. Two trains each way ran on Sundays, calling at all stations en route.

From 1900 until 1952 Lowton St Mary's was also served by passenger trains running to St Helens Central.

In 1922 five "down" (towards St Helens and Wigan) trains called at the station on Mondays to Saturdays. They called at all stations from Manchester Central to St Helens via Glazebrook and Culcheth. It is difficult to be certain from the timetable whether these trains split at Lowton St Mary's with a portion proceeding to Wigan Central, or whether passengers for Wigan had to change, but in either event those same six trains also took Lowton St Mary's passengers calling at all stations to Wigan. Given the dwell times for St Helens trains, it appears that theirs was a through service.

A lone train calling at all stations from Manchester to Wigan - the 18:46 from Lowton St Mary's - had no St Helens connection or portion, serving the Wigan Central line only.

Three Down trains, one Fridays and Saturdays Only and two Saturdays only, appeared to start at Culcheth calling All Stations to Wigan Central, with no St Helens portion or connection. It may be that these trains originated at Liverpool Central, turning West to North at the triangular Glazebrook West Junction, but the timetable doesn't seem to confirm this.

The "up" service was broadly similar, but the mix of all week and Saturdays Only/Excepted was more complex.

No trains ran on Sundays.

In the Second World War the line through Lowton St Mary's was more frequently used, though after 1945 the line started to deteriorate.

A fuller selection of public and working timetables has now been published. Among other things this suggests that Sunday services ran to St Helens until 1914, but had ceased by 1922, never to return.

The services to and from St Helens ended when that line closed to passenger traffic on 3 March 1952.

Lowton St Mary's closed to passengers on 2 November 1964. The line survived as freight only until 1968.

The line through Lowton St Mary's was also a diversionary route and a route by which traffic such as Summer Saturday holiday specials could bypass busy spots, such as Wigan. Pixton, for example, has a fine 1961 shot of a Summer Saturday Sheffield to Blackpool train at the station. It would bear right at Hindley South onto the Whelley Loop and then join the WCML at Standish, bypassing Wigan altogether.

By far and away the most heavily loaded, but sporadic, passenger trains through the station turned west for Haydock Park racecourse.

== The Station Site ==
The station was a regular entrant into and sometime winner of "Station in Bloom" competitions.

The tracks through the station were lifted by 1970. The station has been demolished. The site was occupied by a wood yard in 2005, showing scant signs of its railway origins.

== Location map ==
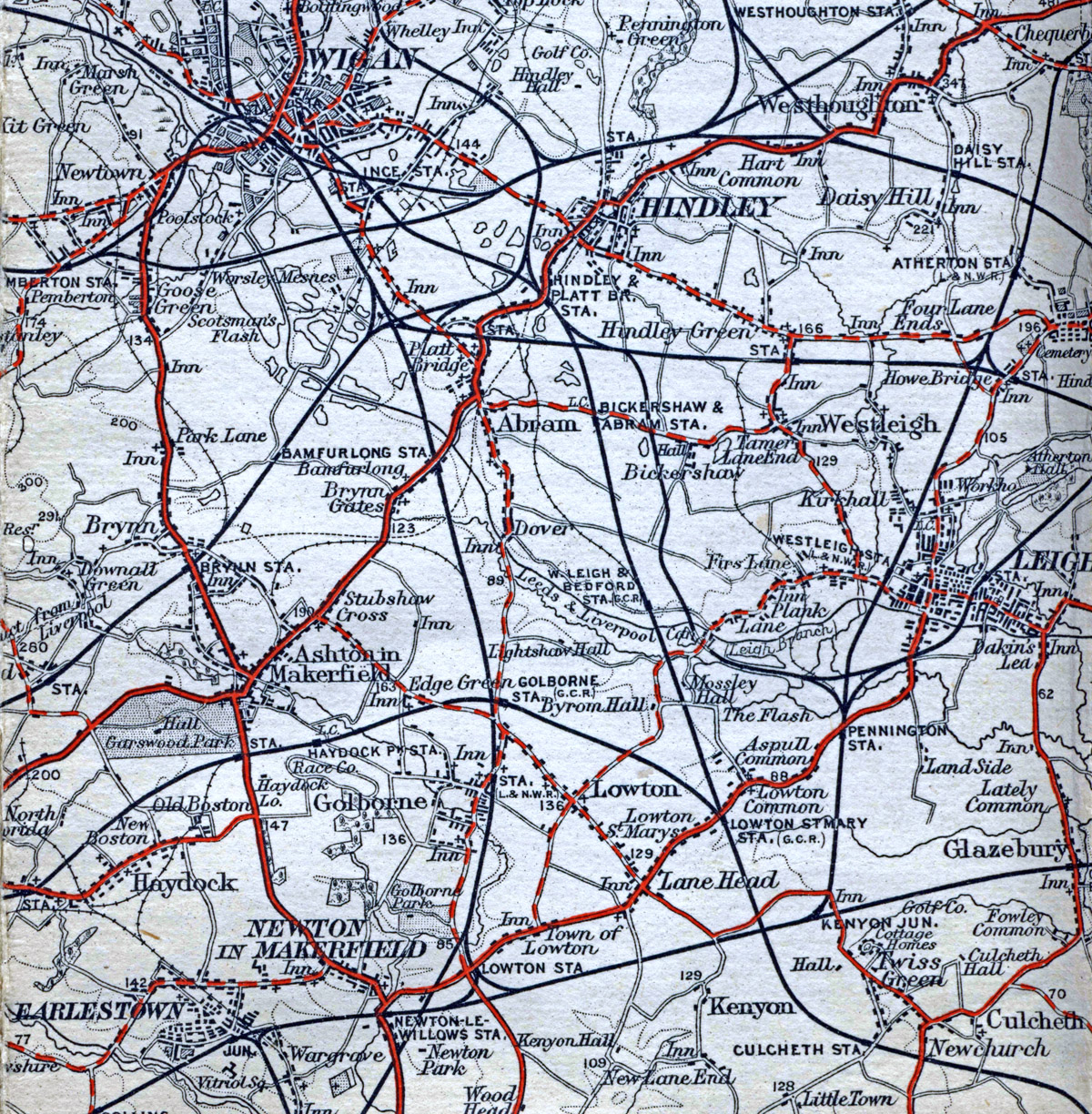
1911 map showing the location of Lowton St Mary's station (lower right) on the GCR line from Glazebrook Junction to Wigan Central

== Routes ==
Preceding station	Disused railways	Following station
West Leigh and Bedford; Line and station closed	Great Central Railway; Wigan Junction Railways	Culcheth; Line and station closed
Haydock Park; Line and station closed	Great Central Railway; Wigan Junction Railways	Culcheth; Line and station closed

== Sources ==
- Bradshaw, George (1985) [July 1922]. Bradshaw's General Railway and Steam Navigation guide for Great Britain and Ireland: A reprint of the July 1922 issue. Newton Abbot: David & Charles. ISBN 978-0-7153-8708-5. OCLC 12500436.
- Butt, R. V. J. (October 1995). The Directory of Railway Stations: details every public and private passenger station, halt, platform and stopping place, past and present (1st ed.). Sparkford: Patrick Stephens Ltd. ISBN 978-1-85260-508-7. OCLC 60251199. OL 11956311M.
- Conolly, W. Philip (1998). British railways pre-grouping atlas and gazetteer (9th impression; 5th ed.). Shepperton: Ian Allan. ISBN 978-0-7110-0320-0. OCLC 221481275.
- Dow, George (1985) [1962]. Great Central, Volume Two: Dominion of Watkin 1864–1899. Shepperton: Ian Allan. ISBN 978-0-7110-1469-5. OCLC 655324061.
- Dow, George (1985) [1965]. Great Central, Volume Three: Fay Sets the Pace, 1900–1922. Shepperton: Ian Allan. ISBN 978-0-7110-0263-0. OCLC 500447049.
- Fields, N; Gilbert, A C; Knight, N R (1980), Liverpool to Manchester into the Second Century, Manchester Transport Museum Society, ISBN 978-0-900857-19-5
- Pixton, Bob (1996), The Archive Photographs Series Widnes and St Helens Railways, The Chalford Publishing Company, ISBN 0-7524-0751-1
- Smith, Paul; Turner, Keith (2012), Railway Atlas Then and Now, Ian Allan Publishing, ISBN 978-0-7110-3695-6
- Sweeney, Dennis J (2014). The St. Helens and Wigan Junction Railway. Leigh: Triangle Publishing. ISBN 978-0-85361-292-6.
- Sweeney, Dennis (2013). The Wigan Junction Railways. Leigh: Triangle Publishing. ISBN 978-0-9550030-5-9.
