= Wigan Council elections =

Local government elections in Greater Manchester, England

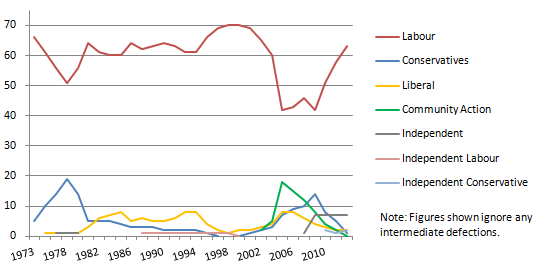
Seat totals, 1973-2012

Wigan Metropolitan Borough Council elections are generally held three years out of every four, with a third of the council being elected each time. Wigan Metropolitan Borough Council, generally known as Wigan Council, is the local authority for the metropolitan borough of Wigan in Greater Manchester, England. Since the last boundary changes in 2023, 75 councillors have been elected from 25 wards.

== Council elections ==
Summary of the council composition after council elections, click on the year for full details of each election. Boundary changes took place for the 1980 election, and more recently the 2004 election – which increased the number of seats by three. Both needed the whole council to be elected in those years.

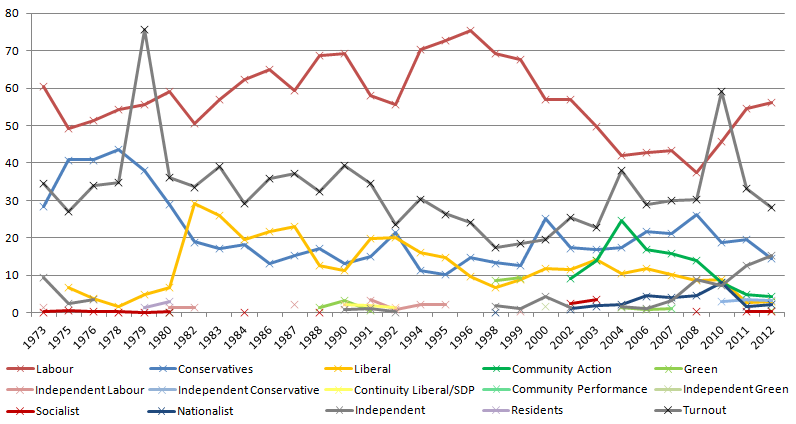
Popular vote shares, 1973-2012

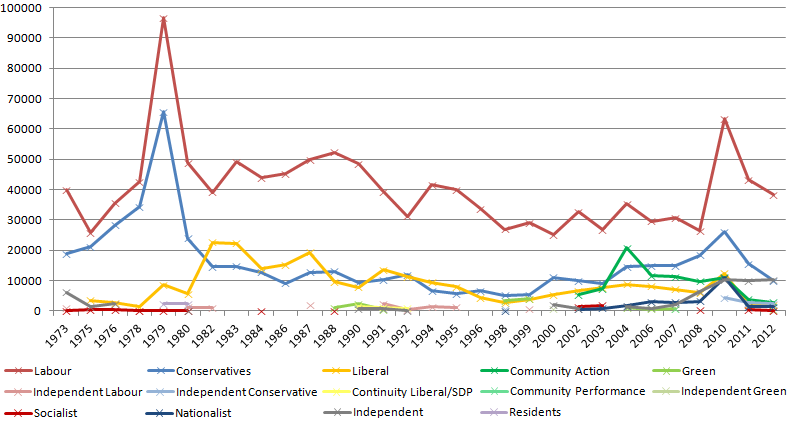
Popular vote figures, 1973-2012

Year	Labour	Conservative	Liberal Democrats	Community Action	Independent/others	Reform UK	Notes
1973	66	5	0	0	1	-	
1975	61	10	1	0	0	-	
1976	56	14	1	0	1	-	
1978	51	19	1	0	1	-	
1979	56	14	1	0	1	-	
1980	64	5	3	0	0	-	New ward boundaries
1982	61	5	6	0	0	-	
1983	60	5	7	0	0	-	
1984	60	4	8	0	0	-	
1986	64	3	5	0	0	-	
1987	62	3	6	0	1	-	
1988	63	3	5	0	1	-	
1990	64	2	5	0	1	-	
1991	63	2	6	0	1	-	
1992	61	2	8	0	1	-	
1994	61	2	8	0	1	-	
1995	66	1	4	0	1	-	
1996	69	0	2	0	1	-	
1998	70	0	1	0	1	-	
1999	70	0	2	0	0	-	
2000	69	1	2	0	0	-	
2002	65	2	3	2	0	-	
2003	60	3	4	5	0	-	
2004	42	7	8	18	0	-	New ward boundaries
2006	43	9	8	15	0	-	
2007	46	10	6	12	1	-	
2008	42	14	4	8	7	-	
2010	51	8	3	4	9	-	
2011	58	5	2	2	8	-	
2012	63	1	2	0	9	-	
2014	62	2	0	0	11	-	
2015	64	3	0	0	8	-	
2016	65	5	0	-	5	-	
2018	60	7	0	-	8	-	
2019	57	8	0	-	10	-	
2021	57	8	0	-	10	-	
2022	61	7	0	-	7	-	
2023	64	2	0	-	9	0	New ward boundaries
2024	64	1	0	-	10	0	
2026	42	0	0	-	8	25	
2027	TBC	TBC	TBC	-	TBC	TBC	

== Borough result maps ==
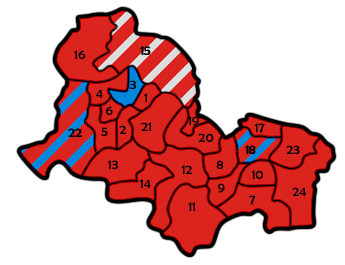
1973 results map

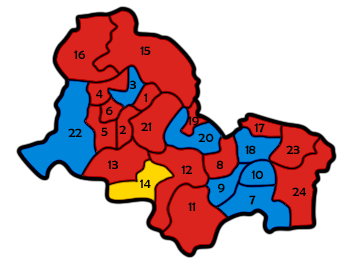
1975 results map

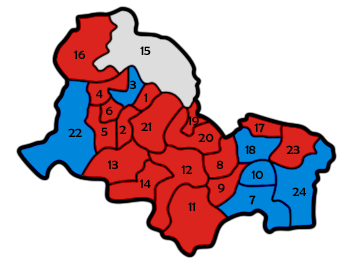
1976 results map

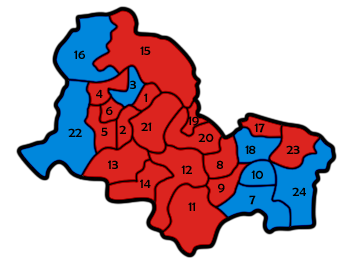
1978 results map

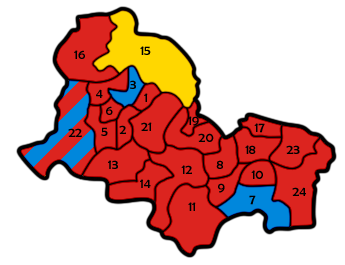
1979 results map

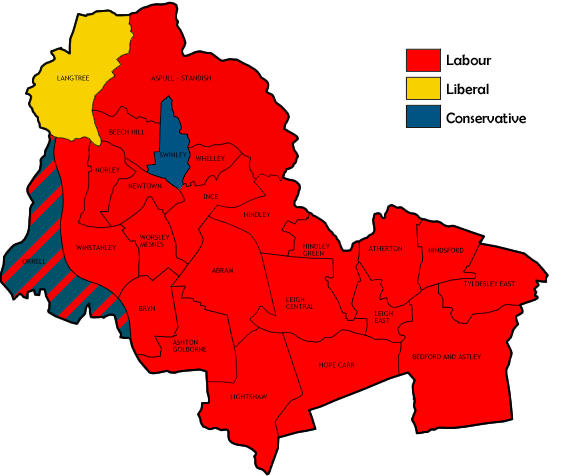
1980 results map

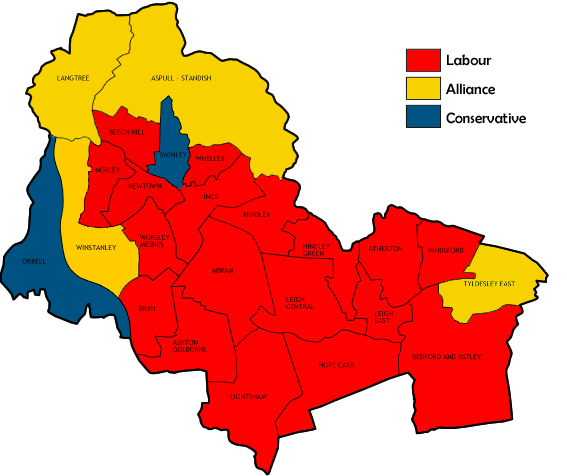
1981 results map

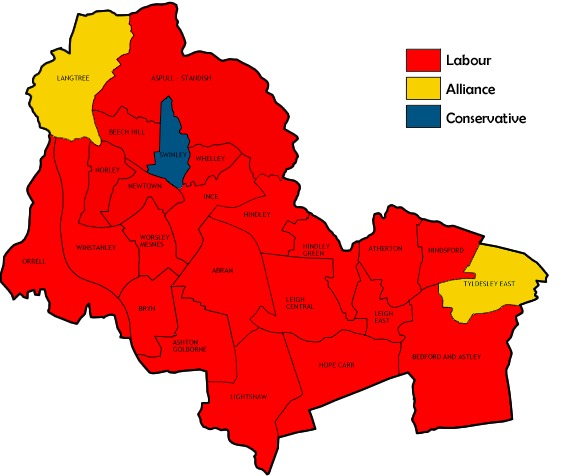
1982 results map

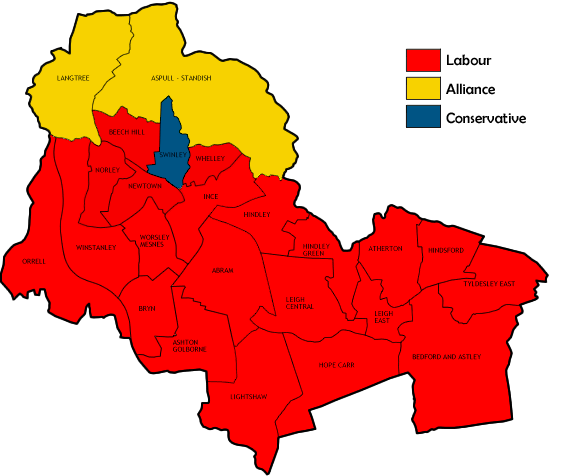
1983 results map

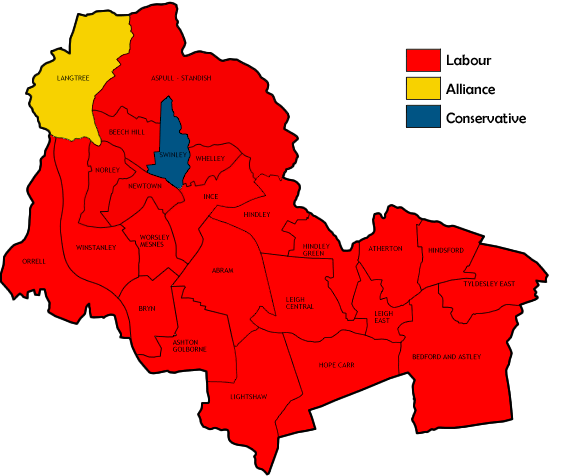
1984 results map

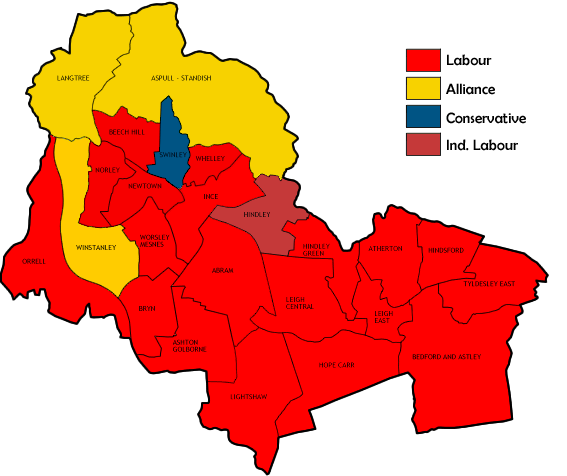
1985 results map

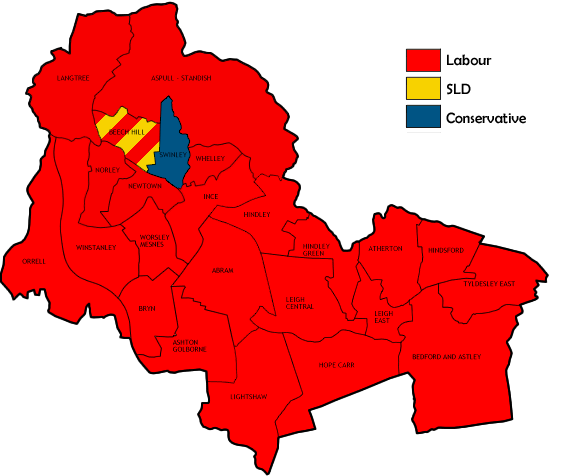
1986 results map

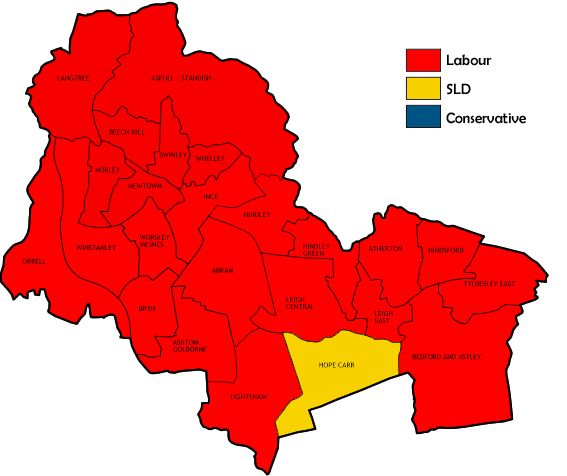
1987 results map

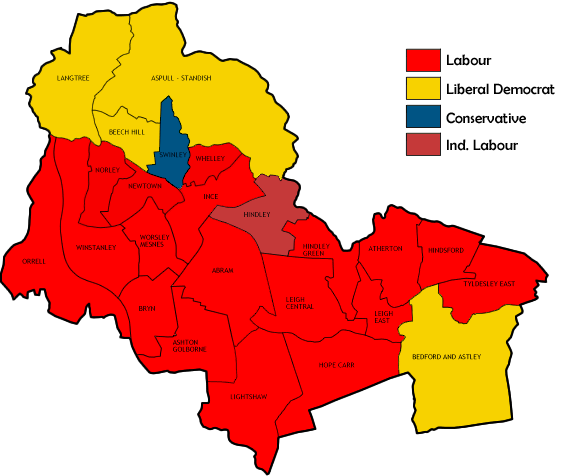
1988 results map

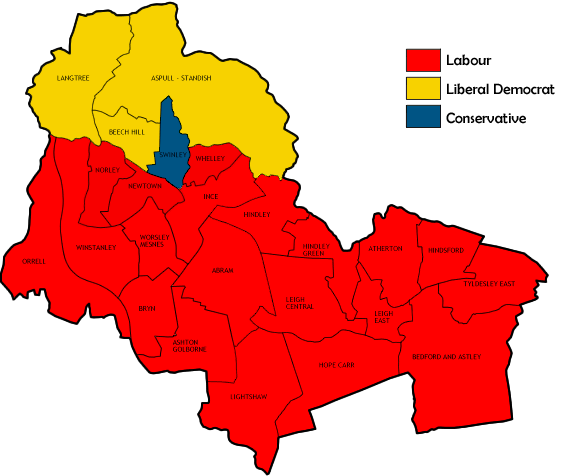
1989 results map

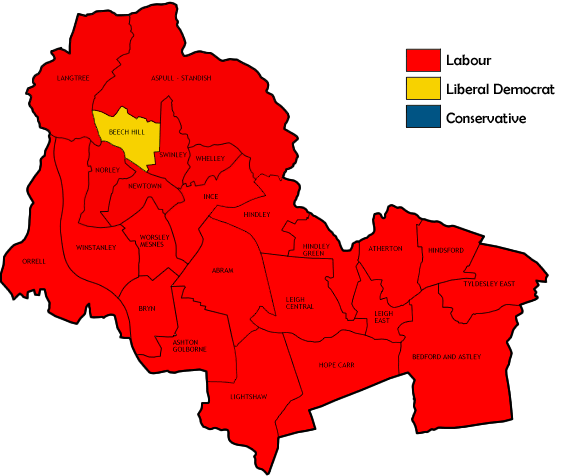
1990 results map

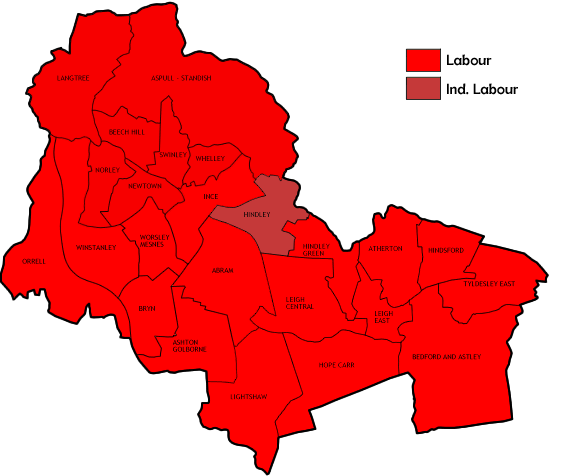
1991 results map

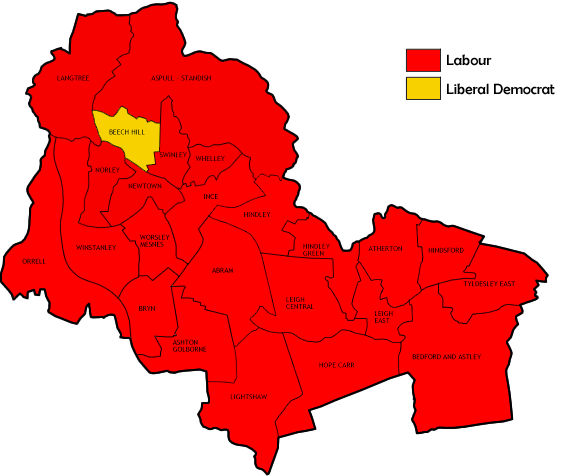
1992 results map

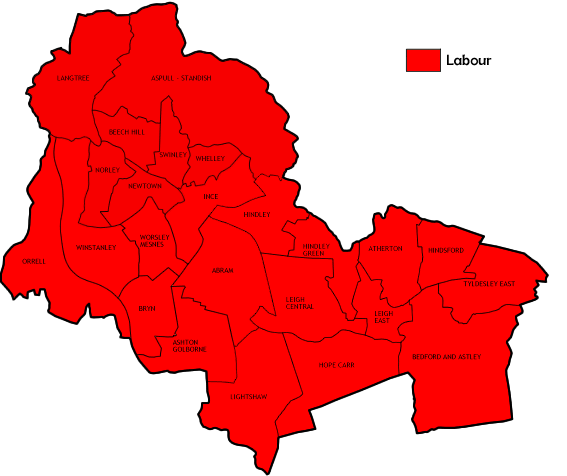
1993 results map

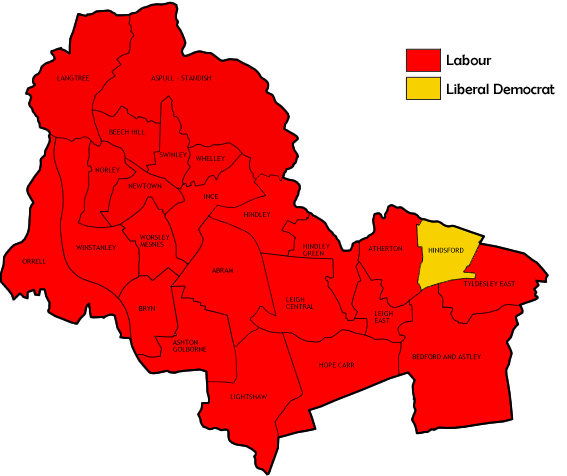
1994 results map

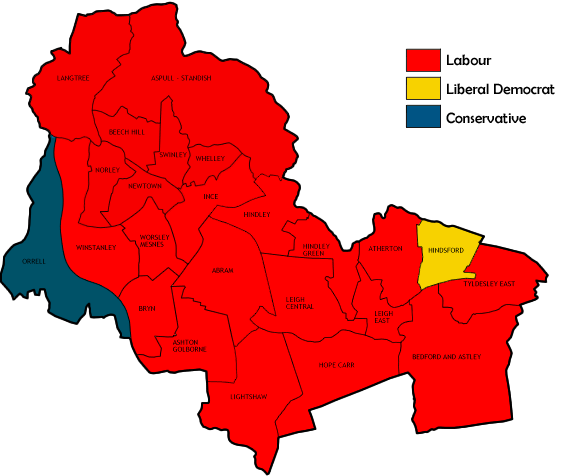
1995 results map

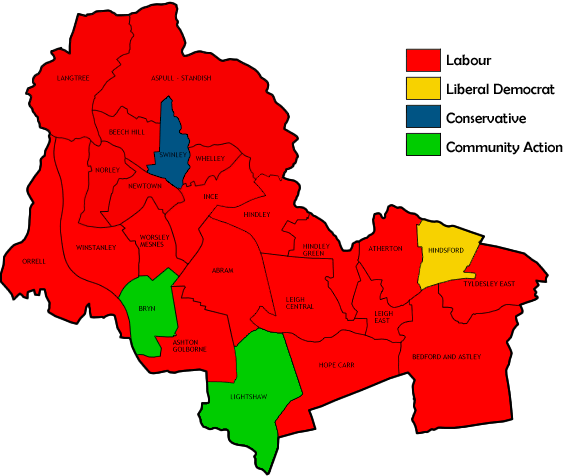
1996 results map

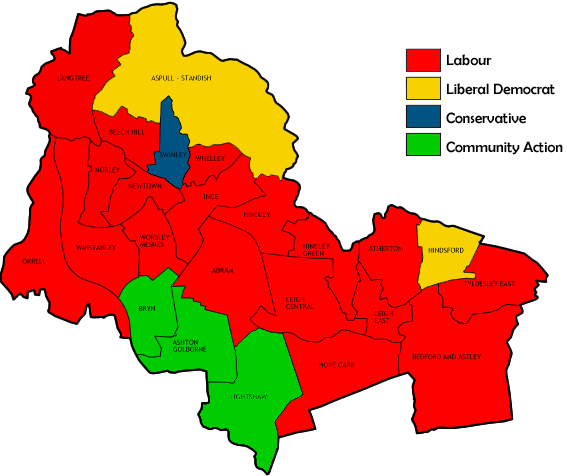
2003 results map

2004 results map

2006 results map

2007 results map

2008 results map

2010 results map

2011 results map

2012 results map

2014 results map

2015 results map

2016 results map

2018 results map

2019 results map

2021 results map

2022 results map

2023 results map

2024 results map

== By-election results ==
By-election	Date	Incumbent party	Winning party
Orrell by-election	1984	Conservative	Labour
Bedford and Astley by-election	21 February 1985	Labour	Labour
Swinley by-election	28 March 1985	Conservative	Labour
Orrell by-election	17 October 1985	Labour	Labour
Beech Hill by-election	1994	Liberal Democrats	Labour
Aspull-Standish by-election	13 March 1997	Labour	Labour
Ince by-election	26 June 1997	Labour	Labour
Hope Carr by-election	6 November 1997	Labour	Labour
Beech Hill by-election	5 November 1998	Labour	Liberal Democrats
Hindsford by-election	2 December 1999	Labour	Liberal Democrats
Atherton by-election	5 April 2001	Labour	Liberal Democrats
Hope Carr by-election	7 June 2001	Labour	Labour
Hindsford by-election	25 October 2001	Liberal Democrats	Labour
Leigh Central by-election	26 September 2002	Labour	Labour
Douglas by-election	16 June 2005	Labour	Labour
Tyldesley by-election	28 June 2007	Liberal Democrats	Liberal Democrats
Wigan West by-election	20 September 2007	Labour	Labour
Wigan Central by-election	18 October 2007	Conservative	Conservative
Wigan West by-election	10 July 2008	Labour	Labour
Wigan Central by-election	3 March 2011	Conservative	Labour
Pemberton by-election	4 April 2013	Labour	Labour
Winstanley by-election	24 October 2013	Labour	Labour
Douglas by-election	13 November 2014	Labour	Labour
Astley Mosley Common by-election	19 October 2017	Labour	Labour
Shevington with Lower Ground by-election	14 December 2017	Labour	Labour
Leigh West by-election	14 October 2021	Labour	Labour
Bryn by-election	25 November 2021	Independent	Labour
Ashton by-election	15 December 2022	Labour	Labour
Leigh South by-election	4 July 2024	Labour	Labour
Wigan Central by-election	2 October 2025	Labour	Reform
Hindley Green by-election	12 November 2026	Independent	Labour
