= 1996 Wigan Metropolitan Borough Council election =

1996 UK local government election

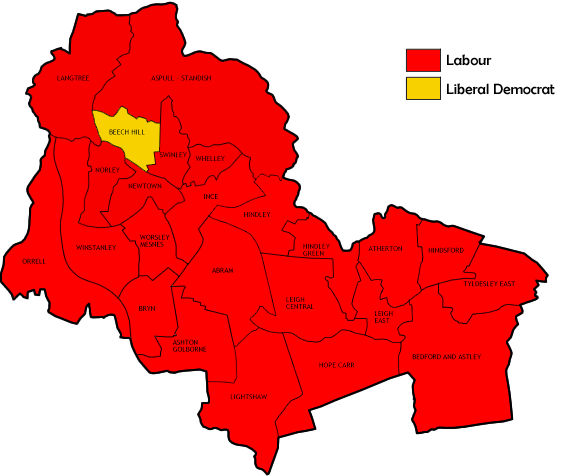
Map of the results of the 1996 Wigan council election.

Elections to Wigan council were held on Thursday, 2 May 1996, with an extra vacancy in Abram to be filled. Going into the election there were noticeably fewer candidates than usual, with the total candidate number and the five uncontested wards only narrowly lower than the all-time lows set at the 1990 election. This was mainly caused by the lack of any minor party candidates, and the Liberal Democrat slate dropping by half upon the previous election, to seven - their scarcest outing since their lowest ebb throughout their merger in 1990, but more reminiscent of their patchy participation of the seventies. Turnout had been consistently poor in recent elections, and this election continued the downward trend, dropping below a quarter of the electorate for the second time (the first being the all-time low set in 1992) to 24.2%.

Labour once again surpassed their vote share high, this time recording a zenith of over three-quarters of votes cast, but simultaneously attained their third lowest vote figure in history (1975 and 1992 being lower). The Conservatives managed to increase modestly upon their rock-bottom standing of the previous year, but on accumulated votes they failed to surpass anything other than their nadir. The Lib Dems figure reflected their seventies-style participation, with their vote share reduced to single figures for the first since 1980, and their lowest vote figure since 1978.

Following Labour's overwhelming victories scored in recent years, both the Liberal Democrats and the Conservatives were looking at a wipe-out, or near that for the Lib Dems, if they couldn't vastly improve upon recent performances. The Conservatives, long confined to the ward of Swinley, failed to improve their vote meaningfully and were handily defeated, ending their 23-year representation on the council. The Lib Dems were facing a similarly arduous task, and in their former-bastion of Langtree actually suffered a swing away from them. However, they managed a sizeable swing of 14.4% in Beech Hill to hold on to their second seat in the council by a mere 34 vote majority. This left Labour with the largest majority since the council's creation of 66.

== Election result ==
Wigan local election result 1996
Party	Seats	Gains	Losses	Net gain/loss	Seats %	Votes %	Votes	+/−
Labour	24	3	0	+3	96.0	75.4	33,824	+2.6%
Liberal Democrats	1	0	2	-2	4.0	9.8	4,408	-4.9%
Conservative	0	0	1	-1	0.0	14.8	6,627	+4.6%

This result had the following consequences for the total number of seats on the Council after the elections:

Party	Previous council	New council
Labour	66	69
Liberal Democrats	4	2
Independent Labour	1	1
Conservatives	1	0
Total	72	72
Working majority	60	66

== Ward results ==
Abram
Party	Candidate	Votes	%	±%
Labour	A. Bennett	1,416	90.6	−0.1
Labour	E. Smethurst	1,243		
Conservative	A. Eccles	147	9.4	+0.1
Majority		1,096	81.2	−0.3
Turnout		1,563	16.7	−3.6
Labour hold		Swing		
Labour hold		Swing	-0.1	

Ashton-Golborne
Party	Candidate	Votes	%	±%
Labour	P. Kirkwood	1,827	79.9	+3.1
Conservative	M. Winstanley	459	20.1	+5.4
Majority		1,368	59.8	−2.3
Turnout		2,286	23.4	−2.8
Labour hold		Swing	-1.1	

Aspull-Standish
Party	Candidate	Votes	%	±%
Labour	C. Ready	2,027	66.4	+17.4
Liberal Democrats	T. Beswick	577	18.9	−23.5
Conservative	J. Davies	449	14.7	+6.0
Majority		1,450	49.5	+40.9
Turnout		3,053	27.1	−4.9
Labour gain from Liberal Democrats		Swing	+20.4	

Atherton
Party	Candidate	Votes	%	±%
Labour	J. Clarke	1,914	85.4	N/A
Conservative	R. Oxley	328	14.6	N/A
Majority		1,586	70.7	N/A
Turnout		2,242	25.1	N/A
Labour hold		Swing	N/A	

Bedford-Astley
Party	Candidate	Votes	%	±%
Labour	J. Jones	1,283	64.6	−3.7
Liberal Democrats	R. Bleakley	703	35.4	+12.2
Majority		580	29.2	−15.9
Turnout		1,986	23.2	−3.7
Labour hold		Swing	-7.9	

Beech Hill
Party	Candidate	Votes	%	±%
Liberal Democrats	J. McGarty	1,445	48.8	+14.6
Labour	J. Dewey	1,411	47.7	−14.2
Conservative	J. Cartwright	103	3.5	−0.4
Majority		34	1.1	−26.5
Turnout		2,959	33.7	+2.1
Liberal Democrats hold		Swing	+14.4	

Bryn
Party	Candidate	Votes	%	±%
Labour	M. Millington	1,969	86.5	−1.0
Conservative	M. Green	307	13.5	+1.0
Majority		1,662	73.0	−2.0
Turnout		2,276	23.0	−4.8
Labour hold		Swing	-1.0	

Hindley
Party	Candidate	Votes	%	±%
Labour	A. Robinson	Unopposed	N/A	N/A
Labour hold		Swing	N/A	

Hindley Green
Party	Candidate	Votes	%	±%
Labour	S. Murphy	1,733	82.2	+1.2
Conservative	C. Butterworth	375	17.8	+8.5
Majority		1,358	64.4	−6.8
Turnout		2,108	18.8	−1.9
Labour hold		Swing	-3.6	

Hindsford
Party	Candidate	Votes	%	±%
Labour	W. Smith	Unopposed	N/A	N/A
Labour hold		Swing	N/A	

Hope Carr
Party	Candidate	Votes	%	±%
Labour	B. Jarvis	1,780	59.6	+2.5
Liberal Democrats	P. Hough	649	21.7	−11.7
Conservative	D. Morris	558	18.7	+9.2
Majority		1,131	37.8	+14.2
Turnout		2,987	29.9	−2.6
Labour hold		Swing	+7.1	

Ince
Party	Candidate	Votes	%	±%
Labour	K. Baldwin	1,643	92.6	N/A
Conservative	C. Duffy	131	7.4	N/A
Majority		1,512	85.2	N/A
Turnout		1,774	22.8	N/A
Labour hold		Swing	N/A	

Langtree
Party	Candidate	Votes	%	±%
Labour	D. Brown	1,983	68.2	+5.1
Liberal Democrats	J. Barrington	612	21.0	−6.7
Conservative	F. Parkinson	313	10.7	+1.6
Majority		1,371	47.1	+11.9
Turnout		2,908	25.2	−3.4
Labour gain from Liberal Democrats		Swing	+5.9	

Leigh Central
Party	Candidate	Votes	%	±%
Labour	J. Hession	Unopposed	N/A	N/A
Labour hold		Swing	N/A	

Leigh East
Party	Candidate	Votes	%	±%
Labour	S. Kennedy	1,733	82.6	+11.6
Conservative	A. Oxley	364	17.3	+7.8
Majority		1,369	62.3	+13.6
Turnout		2,097	20.5	−5.2
Labour hold		Swing	+1.9	

Lightshaw
Party	Candidate	Votes	%	±%
Labour	D. Kelly	2,616	82.5	−0.8
Conservative	J. Gorse	553	17.4	+0.8
Majority		2,063	65.1	−1.6
Turnout		3,169	28.5	−3.3
Labour hold		Swing	-0.8	

Newtown
Party	Candidate	Votes	%	±%
Labour	M. Coghlin	1,596	85.9	−4.9
Conservative	W. Maddocks	152	8.2	+8.2
Liberal Democrats	J. Beswick	110	5.9	−3.2
Majority		1,444	77.7	−4.0
Turnout		1,858	21.2	−1.7
Labour hold		Swing	-6.5	

Norley
Party	Candidate	Votes	%	±%
Labour	B. Bourne	Unopposed	N/A	N/A
Labour hold		Swing	N/A	

Orrell
Party	Candidate	Votes	%	±%
Labour	E. Swift	1,698	71.0	−2.8
Conservative	F. Rylance	694	29.0	+2.8
Majority		1,004	42.0	−5.5
Turnout		2,392	25.9	−0.8
Labour hold		Swing	-2.8	

Swinley
Party	Candidate	Votes	%	±%
Labour	G. Walsh	1,692	58.8	−1.0
Conservative	E. Cartwright	875	30.4	+1.3
Liberal Democrats	A. Robinson	312	10.8	−0.3
Majority		817	28.4	−2.3
Turnout		2,879	32.4	+2.1
Labour gain from Conservative		Swing	-1.1	

Tyldesley East
Party	Candidate	Votes	%	±%
Labour	A. Stephenson	Unopposed	N/A	N/A
Labour hold		Swing	N/A	

Whelley
Party	Candidate	Votes	%	±%
Labour	A. Coyle	1,664	89.0	−1.9
Conservative	T. Sharpe	205	11.0	+1.9
Majority		1,459	78.1	−3.8
Turnout		1,869	23.2	−2.0
Labour hold		Swing	-1.9	

Winstanley
Party	Candidate	Votes	%	±%
Labour	R. Winkworth	1,991	83.6	−2.8
Conservative	G. Whiston	389	16.3	+2.8
Majority		1,602	67.3	−5.5
Turnout		2,380	20.0	−2.7
Labour hold		Swing	-2.8	

Worsley Mesnes
Party	Candidate	Votes	%	±%
Labour	W. Brogan	1,848	89.1	−1.2
Conservative	A. Sutton	225	10.8	+1.2
Majority		1,623	78.3	−2.3
Turnout		2,073	21.0	−0.2
Labour hold		Swing	-1.2	

== By-elections between 1996 and 1998 ==
Aspull Standish By-Election 13 March 1997
Party	Candidate	Votes	%	±%
Labour	G. Davies	1,287	70.2	+3.8
Conservative		275	15.0	+0.3
Liberal Democrats		270	14.7	−4.2
Majority		1,012	55.2	+5.7
Turnout		1,832	16.0	−11.1
Labour hold		Swing	+1.7	

Ince By-Election 26 June 1997
Party	Candidate	Votes	%	±%
Labour	J. Hurst	685	92.1	−0.5
Conservative		59	7.9	+0.5
Majority		626	84.2	−1.0
Turnout		744	9.6	−13.2
Labour hold		Swing	-0.5	

Hope Carr By-Election 6 November 1997
Party	Candidate	Votes	%	±%
Labour	C. Hale	1,045	49.7	−9.9
Green	Chris Maile	636	30.2	+30.2
Conservative		321	15.3	−3.4
Liberal Democrats		102	4.8	−16.9
Majority		409	19.5	−18.3
Turnout		2,104	21.0	−8.9
Labour hold		Swing	-20.0	
