= 1999 Wigan Metropolitan Borough Council election =

1999 UK local government election

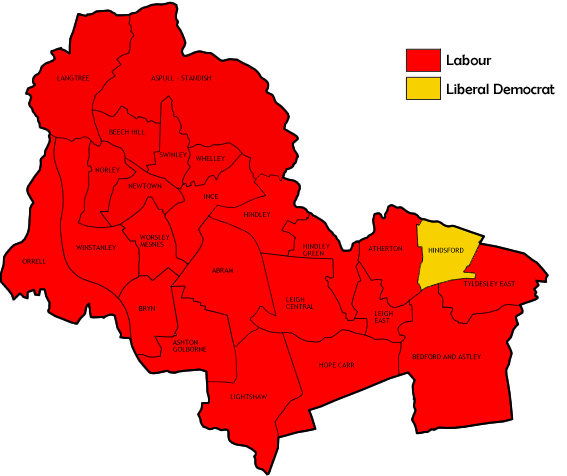
Map of the results of the 1999 Wigan council election.

The 1999 Elections to Wigan Metropolitan Borough Council were held on 6 May 1999. One-third of the council was up for election. Prior to the election, the Liberal Democrats had gained the seat being fought in Beech Hill from Labour in a by-election, and long-time Labour councillor for Atherton, Jack Sumner, had defected to independent.

All wards were fought for the first time since 1992, and the election boasted the highest number of candidates excepting the all-out elections of 1973 and 1980. The increase came from the Green Party standing a full-slate, seemingly energised by their third place the previous year, with both Labour and the Conservatives repeating their recent contesting rates. The Lib Dem's showing of six candidates, conversely, resembled a party resigned to fourth place. Elsewhere the aforementioned Independent was fighting Leigh East, and an incumbent Independent Labour candidate sought her fourth term in Hindley.

The previous year had brought about the worst turnout recorded, and this election did little to improve upon it, increasing by just one percent to 18.4%. The general picture too was one of little difference to the preceding election. All three main parties managed to improve their vote upon the previous year's historic lows, but none were able to in a significant manner, and as such, their figures remained at historically poor levels. The party shares were also little changed, with a modest recovery of the Lib Dems and the Greens achieving a new peak mainly at the expense of Labour.

Labour, however, made a net gain as they retook their seat in Beech Hill from last year's by-election victors the Lib Dems, and finally ousted the Independent Labour who'd held her seat in Hindley for more than a decade. Their solitary loss was a shock defeat in their previously safe seat of Hindsford, as the Lib Dems surged on a 21.6% swing to displace Samuel Little from the council – whose incumbency had been uninterrupted in the 25-year-long history of the council up to that point. The comparable record of the independent was ended as he made little progress in Leigh East and the Greens looked no more competitive than the previous year – and actually less in certain areas.

== Election results ==
Wigan local election result 1999
Party	Seats	Gains	Losses	Net gain/loss	Seats %	Votes %	Votes	+/−
Labour	23	2	1	+1	95.8	67.7	29,012	-1.6
Liberal Democrats	1	1	1	0	4.2	8.9	3,839	+2.2
Conservative	0	0	0	0	0.0	12.7	5,428	-0.6
Green	0	0	0	0	0.0	9.3	4,004	+0.6
Independent Labour	0	0	1	-1	0.0	1.0	440	+1.0
Independent	0	0	0	0	0.0	0.3	147	-1.5

This result had the following consequences for the total number of seats on the council after the elections:

Party	Previous council	New council
Labour	69	70
Liberal Democrat	2	2
Conservative	0	0
Green	0	0
Independent Labour	1	0
Independent	0	0
Total	72	72
Working majority	66	68

== Ward results ==
Abram
Party	Candidate	Votes	%	±%
Labour	B. Hampson	890	79.0	−7.5
Conservative	M. Green	155	13.8	+0.3
Green	P. Murphy	81	7.2	+7.2
Majority		735	65.3	−7.7
Turnout		1,126	12.4	+0.6
Labour hold		Swing	-3.9	

Ashton-Golborne
Party	Candidate	Votes	%	±%
Labour	J. Hilton	1,227	70.3	+17.5
Conservative	F. Parkinson	308	17.6	+8.9
Green	L. Maile	211	12.1	+12.1
Majority		919	52.6	+35.0
Turnout		1,746	17.0	−2.4
Labour hold		Swing	+4.3	

Aspull-Standish
Party	Candidate	Votes	%	±%
Labour	G. Davies	1,375	58.2	−8.2
Liberal Democrats	J. Beswick	499	21.1	+21.1
Conservative	E. Mather	345	14.6	−5.8
Green	D. Schanzi	145	6.1	−7.1
Majority		876	37.0	9.0
Turnout		2,364	20.3	+1.0
Labour hold		Swing	-14.6	

Atherton
Party	Candidate	Votes	%	±%
Labour	R. Holmes	1,188	74.7	+2.7
Conservative	N. Isherwood	260	16.3	−0.6
Green	P. Brown	142	8.9	−2.1
Majority		928	58.4	+3.2
Turnout		1,590	18.4	+1.0
Labour hold		Swing	+1.6	

Bedford-Astley
Party	Candidate	Votes	%	±%
Labour	J. Lea	1,110	71.2	−4.7
Conservative	N. Dugmore	275	17.7	+17.7
Green	K. Barry	173	11.1	−12.9
Majority		835	53.6	+1.7
Turnout		1,558	18.4	+2.7
Labour hold		Swing	-11.2	

Beech Hill
Party	Candidate	Votes	%	±%
Labour	A. Collins	1,386	56.9	+3.1
Liberal Democrats	T. Beswick	1,012	41.5	−4.7
Green	A. Deardon	39	1.6	+1.6
Majority		374	15.3	+7.7
Turnout		2,437	27.1	+0.5
Labour gain from Liberal Democrats		Swing	+3.9	

Bryn
Party	Candidate	Votes	%	±%
Labour	R. Atkinson	1,396	77.8	+2.0
Conservative	A. Davies	275	15.3	+0.7
Green	D. Sanderson	123	6.8	−2.7
Majority		1,121	62.5	+1.2
Turnout		1,794	18.1	+0.3
Labour hold		Swing	+0.6	

Hindley
Party	Candidate	Votes	%	±%
Labour	J. Topping	1,120	66.7	−0.5
Independent Labour	E. Edwardson	440	26.2	+26.2
Green	C. Littler	119	7.1	−25.6
Majority		680	40.5	+6.0
Turnout		1,679	16.7	+2.6
Labour gain from Independent Labour		Swing	-13.3	

Hindley Green
Party	Candidate	Votes	%	±%
Labour	P. Turner	1,197	77.2	+2.2
Conservative	D. Morris	219	14.1	−4.3
Green	E. Brown	134	8.6	+2.0
Majority		978	63.1	+6.5
Turnout		1,550	14.2	+0.3
Labour hold		Swing	+3.2	

Hindsford
Party	Candidate	Votes	%	±%
Liberal Democrats	R. Bleakley	1,299	53.4	+20.3
Labour	S. Little	966	39.7	−22.9
Conservative	L. Dugmore	114	4.7	+4.7
Green	W. Jolly	52	2.1	−2.1
Majority		333	13.7	−15.9
Turnout		2,431	22.8	+4.6
Liberal Democrats gain from Labour		Swing	+21.6	

Hope Carr
Party	Candidate	Votes	%	±%
Labour	C. Hale	1,382	49.9	+0.8
Green	C. Maile	807	29.1	−4.6
Conservative	A. Oxley	580	20.9	+3.8
Majority		575	20.8	+5.4
Turnout		2,769	27.3	+1.5
Labour hold		Swing		

Ince
Party	Candidate	Votes	%	±%
Labour	D. Molyneux	1,021	87.4	−2.7
Green	N. Maile	81	6.9	+6.9
Conservative	H. Topping	66	5.6	−4.3
Majority		940	80.5	+0.3
Turnout		1,168	15.2	+1.0
Labour hold		Swing	-4.8	

Langtree
Party	Candidate	Votes	%	±%
Labour	M. Crosby	1,369	65.5	−3.9
Liberal Democrats	F. Graham	583	27.9	+2.8
Green	E. Kismul	138	6.6	+1.1
Majority		786	37.6	−6.7
Turnout		2,090	17.9	+1.1
Labour hold		Swing	-3.3	

Leigh Central
Party	Candidate	Votes	%	±%
Labour	B. Thomas	1,174	78.7	−1.8
Green	S. Critchley	167	11.2	+0.5
Conservative	T. Matthews	150	10.0	+1.4
Majority		1,007	67.5	−2.3
Turnout		1,491	17.3	−0.0
Labour hold		Swing	-1.1	

Leigh East
Party	Candidate	Votes	%	±%
Labour	K. Cunliffe	1,112	68.7	−5.0
Conservative	D. Davies	254	15.7	−3.2
Independent	J. Sumner	147	9.1	+9.1
Green	N. Howarth	105	6.5	−0.8
Majority		858	53.0	−1.7
Turnout		1,618	15.2	+0.2
Labour hold		Swing	-0.9	

Lightshaw
Party	Candidate	Votes	%	±%
Labour	B. Strett	1,693	67.2	−6.1
Conservative	N. Culshaw	591	23.5	+1.4
Green	S. Clarke	234	9.3	+4.7
Majority		1,102	43.8	−7.5
Turnout		2,518	21.3	−0.0
Labour hold		Swing	-3.7	

Newtown
Party	Candidate	Votes	%	±%
Labour	J. Birch	1,036	83.1	+7.8
Liberal Democrats	L. Fain	146	11.7	+0.9
Green	H. Wilkinson	65	5.2	+2.6
Majority		890	71.4	+7.4
Turnout		8,648	14.4	−0.1
Labour hold		Swing	+3.4	

Norley
Party	Candidate	Votes	%	±%
Labour	S. Parker	1,050	94.2	+3.0
Green	D. Smith	64	5.7	−3.0
Majority		986	88.5	+5.9
Turnout		1,114	15.6	+1.3
Labour hold		Swing	+3.0	

Orrell
Party	Candidate	Votes	%	±%
Labour	R. Capstick	1,051	58.5	−1.1
Conservative	M. Winstanley	639	35.6	+1.5
Green	N. Bird	105	5.8	−0.5
Majority		412	22.9	−2.6
Turnout		1,795	19.7	+0.8
Labour hold		Swing	-1.3	

Swinley
Party	Candidate	Votes	%	±%
Labour	J. Ball	1,143	52.6	−0.9
Conservative	J. Davies	661	30.4	+0.2
Liberal Democrats	A. Robinson	300	13.8	+1.3
Green	D. Saunders	67	3.1	−0.7
Majority		482	22.2	−1.1
Turnout		2,171	25.2	+2.2
Labour hold		Swing	-0.5	

Tyldesley East
Party	Candidate	Votes	%	±%
Labour	S. Hellier	1,406	74.8	N/A
Green	P. Thake	473	25.2	N/A
Majority		933	49.7	N/A
Turnout		1,879	16.1	N/A
Labour hold		Swing	N/A	

Whelley
Party	Candidate	Votes	%	±%
Labour	T. Butler	1,345	86.1	+1.8
Green	J. Wilkinson	217	13.9	+7.3
Majority		1,128	72.2	−3.0
Turnout		1,562	19.3	+2.5
Labour hold		Swing	-2.7	

Winstanley
Party	Candidate	Votes	%	±%
Labour	G. Roberts	1,290	70.1	−8.0
Conservative	J. Cartwright	381	20.7	−1.2
Green	J. Critchley	170	9.2	+9.2
Majority		909	49.4	−6.8
Turnout		1,841	16.4	+1.9
Labour hold		Swing	-3.4	

Worsley Mesnes
Party	Candidate	Votes	%	±%
Labour	J. Baldwin	1,085	81.4	−1.5
Conservative	T. Sutton	155	11.6	−5.4
Green	A. Connor	92	6.9	+6.9
Majority		930	69.8	+3.9
Turnout		1,332	13.9	+0.4
Labour hold		Swing	+1.9	

== By-elections between 1999 and 2000 ==
Hindsford By-Election 2 December 1999
Party	Candidate	Votes	%	±%
Liberal Democrats	Graham Lingings	921	57.1	+3.7
Labour		693	42.9	+3.2
Majority		227	14.2	+0.5
Turnout		1,614	15.0	−7.8
Liberal Democrats gain from Labour		Swing	+0.2	
