= 1998 Wigan Metropolitan Borough Council election =

1998 UK local government election

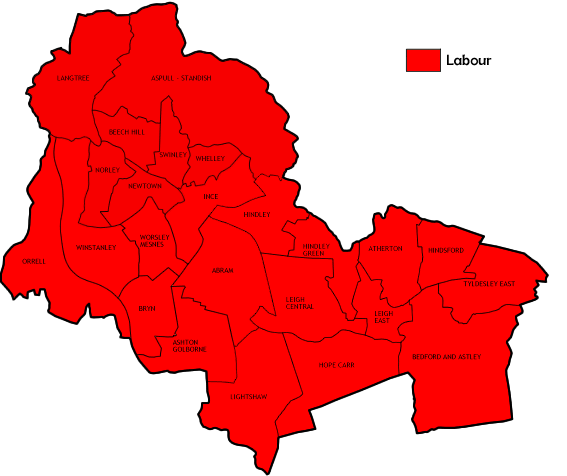
Map of the results of the 1998 Wigan council election.

Elections to Wigan Council were held on 7 May 1998. One third of the council was up for election. Following the previous election there had been three by-elections held—in Aspull-Standish, Ince and Hope Carr—with all three successfully defended by Labour.

Candidate numbers improved dramatically from the preceding election, thanks mostly to the first concerted effort by the Greens, having only tested the waters previously. The Liberal Democrats fielded were, on the other hand, the sparsest from them since 1978, following a similarly poor effort the previous year—perhaps reflecting the party giving up on its previous ambitions. There were also an independent (formerly a Conservative candidate for Bryn in the 1995 election) and the first UKIP candidate fighting Ashton-Golborne. In total all wards but Tydlesday East were contested.

Far from recovering, turnout plummeted to new depths at 17.4%. There was a general apathy emerging across the country during this period, as well as a disillusionment among Conservative voters, but with Labour's complete dominance and the only competitive party standing in less than a quarter of seats, there were evidently other factors for the lack of enthusiasm.

The dire turnout understandably had implications for the party votes, with Labour recording their second-lowest vote (the lowest being 1975), the Conservatives sinking below their rock-bottom set in 1995, and the Lib Dems gaining their worst vote since the aforementioned 1978 election—falling to fourth behind the Greens, who comfortably achieved their best vote. Voter shares were less dramatic for Labour and the Conservatives; however, the Lib Dems' share of 6.7% was their poorest since 1979 and the Greens' share was more than two-and-a-half times larger than their previous peak.

Labour survived substantial challenges against from the Independent in Ashton-Golborne and the Greens in Hope Carr, making the only gain of the night from the Lib Dems in Beech Hill. This reduced the Lib Dems to a sole councillor, losing their status as main opposition for the first time in near twenty years. With only a Liberal Democrat in another Beech Hill seat and an Independent Labour in Hindley remaining as opposition, Labour commanded a record majority of 68.

== Election result ==
Wigan local election result 1998
Party	Seats	Gains	Losses	Net gain/loss	Seats %	Votes %	Votes	+/−
Labour	24	3	0	+1	100.0	69.3	26,962	-6.1%
Conservative	0	0	0	0	0.0	13.3	5,179	-1.5%
Green	0	0	0	0	0.0	8.7	3,375	+8.7%
Liberal Democrats	0	0	1	-1	0.0	6.7	2,618	-3.1%
Independent	0	0	0	0	0.0	1.8	694	+1.8%
UKIP	0	0	0	0	0.0	0.2	66	+0.2%

This result had the following consequences for the total number of seats on the Council after the elections:

Party	Previous council	New council
Labour	69	70
Liberal Democrat	2	1
Independent Labour	1	1
Conservative	0	0
Green	0	0
Independent	0	0
UKIP	0	0
Total	72	72
Working majority	66	68

== Ward results ==
Abram
Party	Candidate	Votes	%	±%
Labour	E. Smethurst	936	86.5	−4.1
Conservative	J. Cartwright	146	13.5	+4.1
Majority		790	73.0	−8.2
Turnout		1,082	11.8	−5.0
Labour hold		Swing	-4.1	

Ashton-Golborne
Party	Candidate	Votes	%	±%
Labour	A. Bullen	1,042	52.8	−27.1
Independent	W. Holmes	694	35.1	+35.1
Conservative	D. Norris	172	8.7	−11.4
UKIP	J. Venables	66	3.3	+3.3
Majority		348	17.6	−42.2
Turnout		1,974	19.4	−3.9
Labour hold		Swing	-31.1	

Aspull-Standish
Party	Candidate	Votes	%	±%
Labour	J. Hilton	1,494	66.4	+0.0
Conservative	E. Mather	458	20.3	+5.6
Green	J. Maile	298	13.2	+13.2
Majority		1,036	46.0	−1.4
Turnout		2,250	19.3	−7.8
Labour hold		Swing	-2.8	

Atherton
Party	Candidate	Votes	%	±%
Labour	S. Loudon	1,111	72.0	−13.3
Conservative	N. Isherwood	261	16.9	+2.3
Green	C. Clarke	170	11.0	+11.0
Majority		850	55.1	−15.6
Turnout		1,542	17.4	−7.7
Labour hold		Swing	-7.8	

Bedford-Astley
Party	Candidate	Votes	%	±%
Labour	F. Walker	1,020	75.9	+11.3
Green	P. Murphy	323	24.0	+24.0
Majority		697	51.9	+22.7
Turnout		1,343	15.7	−7.5
Labour hold		Swing	-6.3	

Beech Hill
Party	Candidate	Votes	%	±%
Labour	G. Rankin	1,280	53.8	+6.1
Liberal Democrats	T. Beswick	1,099	46.2	−2.6
Majority		181	7.6	+6.4
Turnout		2,379	26.6	−7.1
Labour gain from Liberal Democrats		Swing	+4.3	

Bryn
Party	Candidate	Votes	%	±%
Labour	A. Melling	1,346	75.8	−10.7
Conservative	M. Green	259	14.6	+1.1
Green	L. Maile	170	9.6	+9.6
Majority		1,087	61.2	−11.8
Turnout		1,775	17.8	−5.2
Labour hold		Swing	-5.9	

Hindley
Party	Candidate	Votes	%	±%
Labour	W. Shaw	945	67.2	N/A
Green	C. Littler	460	32.7	N/A
Majority		485	34.5	N/A
Turnout		1,405	14.1	N/A
Labour hold		Swing	N/A	

Hindley Green
Party	Candidate	Votes	%	±%
Labour	W. Simmons	1,147	75.0	−7.2
Conservative	C. Butterworth	282	18.4	+0.6
Green	S. Clarke	101	6.6	+6.6
Majority		865	56.5	−7.9
Turnout		1,530	13.9	−4.9
Labour hold		Swing	-3.9	

Hindsford
Party	Candidate	Votes	%	±%
Labour	E. Smith	1,214	62.7	N/A
Liberal Democrats	R. Bleakley	641	33.1	N/A
Green	S. Clarke	82	4.2	N/A
Majority		573	29.6	N/A
Turnout		1,937	18.2	N/A
Labour hold		Swing	N/A	

Hope Carr
Party	Candidate	Votes	%	±%
Labour	K. Anderson	1,270	49.1	−10.4
Green	C. Maile	873	33.8	+33.8
Conservative	A. Oxley	442	17.1	−1.6
Majority		397	15.3	−22.5
Turnout		2,585	25.7	−4.1
Labour hold		Swing	-22.1	

Ince
Party	Candidate	Votes	%	±%
Labour	J. Hurst	981	90.1	−2.5
Conservative	H. Topping	108	9.9	+2.5
Majority		873	80.2	−5.1
Turnout		1,089	14.1	−8.7
Labour hold		Swing	-2.5	

Langtree
Party	Candidate	Votes	%	±%
Labour	J. O'Neill	1,360	69.4	+1.2
Liberal Democrats	F. Graham	491	25.1	+4.0
Green	E. Kismul	108	5.5	+5.5
Majority		869	44.3	−2.8
Turnout		1,959	16.8	−8.4
Labour hold		Swing	-1.4	

Leigh Central
Party	Candidate	Votes	%	±%
Labour	P. Smith	1,233	80.6	N/A
Green	S. Critchley	164	10.7	N/A
Conservative	T. Matthews	133	8.7	N/A
Majority		1,069	69.9	N/A
Turnout		1,530	17.4	N/A
Labour hold		Swing	N/A	

Leigh East
Party	Candidate	Votes	%	±%
Labour	A. Turnock	1,158	73.7	−8.9
Conservative	D. Davies	298	19.0	+1.6
Green	J. Critchley	114	7.2	+7.2
Majority		860	54.8	−10.5
Turnout		1,570	14.9	−5.6
Labour hold		Swing	-5.2	

Lightshaw
Party	Candidate	Votes	%	±%
Labour	T. Sherratt	1,798	73.3	−9.2
Conservative	N. Culshaw	541	22.1	+4.6
Green	N. Howarth	113	4.6	+4.6
Majority		1,257	51.3	−13.8
Turnout		2,452	21.3	−7.2
Labour hold		Swing	-6.9	

Newtown
Party	Candidate	Votes	%	±%
Labour	C. Hitchen	949	75.2	−10.6
Conservative	T. Peet	143	11.3	+3.1
Liberal Democrats	J. Beswick	136	10.8	+4.9
Green	P. Brown	33	2.6	+2.6
Majority		806	63.9	−13.8
Turnout		1,261	14.5	−6.7
Labour hold		Swing	-6.8	

Norley
Party	Candidate	Votes	%	±%
Labour	N. Turner	943	91.3	N/A
Green	V. Cutrupi	90	8.7	N/A
Majority		853	82.6	N/A
Turnout		1,033	14.3	N/A
Labour hold		Swing	N/A	

Orrell
Party	Candidate	Votes	%	±%
Labour	G. Seaward	1,038	59.6	−11.4
Conservative	M. Winstanley	593	34.0	+5.0
Green	N. Stout	110	6.3	+6.3
Majority		445	25.5	−16.4
Turnout		1,741	18.9	−7.0
Labour hold		Swing	-8.2	

Swinley
Party	Candidate	Votes	%	±%
Labour	S. Turner	1,077	53.5	−5.2
Conservative	J. Davies	608	30.2	−0.2
Liberal Democrats	A. Robinson	251	12.5	+1.6
Green	D. Saunders	76	3.8	+3.8
Majority		469	23.3	−5.1
Turnout		2,012	23.0	−9.4
Labour hold		Swing	-2.5	

Tyldesley East
Party	Candidate	Votes	%	±%
Labour	B. Wilson	Unopposed	N/A	N/A
Labour hold		Swing	N/A	

Whelley
Party	Candidate	Votes	%	±%
Labour	W. Pendleton	1,150	84.3	−4.7
Conservative	T. Sharpe	124	9.1	−1.9
Green	D. Schanzl	90	6.6	+6.6
Majority		1,026	75.2	−2.8
Turnout		1,364	16.8	−6.4
Labour hold		Swing	-1.4	

Winstanley
Party	Candidate	Votes	%	±%
Labour	W. Evans	1,385	78.1	−5.5
Conservative	F. Parkinson	388	21.9	+5.5
Majority		997	56.2	−11.1
Turnout		1,773	14.5	−5.4
Labour hold		Swing	-5.5	

Worsley Mesnes
Party	Candidate	Votes	%	±%
Labour	W. Rotherham	1,085	82.9	−6.2
Conservative	T. Sutton	223	17.0	+6.2
Majority		862	65.9	−12.4
Turnout		1,308	13.4	−7.6
Labour hold		Swing	-6.2	

== By-elections between 1998 and 1999 ==
Beech Hill By-Election 5 November 1998
Party	Candidate	Votes	%	±%
Liberal Democrats	T. Beswick	849	49.4	+3.2
Labour		795	46.3	−7.5
Conservative		39	2.3	+2.3
Green		35	2.0	+2.0
Majority		54	3.1	−4.5
Turnout		1,718	19.2	−7.4
Liberal Democrats gain from Labour		Swing	+5.3	
