= 1983 Wigan Metropolitan Borough Council election =

1983 UK local government election

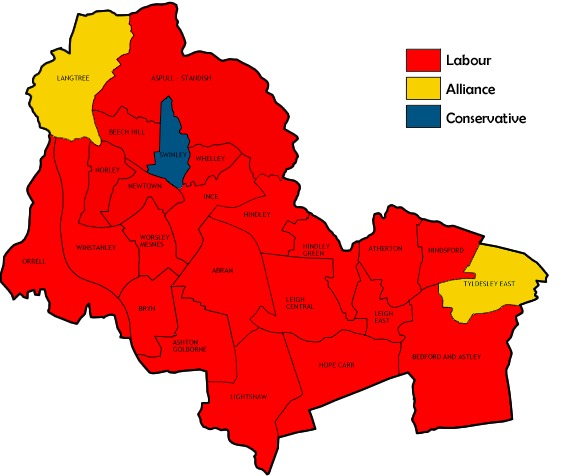
Map of the results of the 1983 Wigan council election.

Elections to the Wigan Council were held on Thursday, 5 May 1983, with one third of the council up for election. The election seen only the main three parties contesting for the first time and one gain in Tyldesley East with Alliance winning their seventh seat from Labour. The Conservatives, contesting a low of seventeen wards, managed their lowest voter share since the council's creation. Overall turnout rose to a relative high of 39.1%.

== Election result ==
Wigan local election result 1983
Party	Seats	Gains	Losses	Net gain/loss	Seats %	Votes %	Votes	+/−
Labour	21	0	1	-1	87.5	57.0	49,230	+6.5%
Alliance	2	1	0	+1	8.3	25.9	22,342	-3.3%
Conservative	1	0	0	0	4.2	17.1	14,790	-1.8%

This result had the following consequences for the total number of seats on the council after the elections:

Party	Previous council	New council
Labour	61	60
SDP-Liberal Alliance	6	7
Conservatives	5	5
Total	72	72
Working majority	50	48

== Ward results ==
Abram
Party	Candidate	Votes	%	±%
Labour	N. Cumberbatch	3,071	84.5	+10.5
Alliance	M. Belshaw	565	15.5	+0.2
Majority		2,506	68.9	+10.3
Turnout		3,636	36.3	+3.3
Labour hold		Swing	+5.1	

Ashton-Golborne
Party	Candidate	Votes	%	±%
Labour	J. Hilton	1,863	63.8	+10.1
Alliance	A. Jones	1,058	36.2	+12.6
Majority		805	27.6	−2.5
Turnout		2,921	30.7	+1.9
Labour hold		Swing	-1.2	

Aspull-Standish
Party	Candidate	Votes	%	±%
Labour	L. Chamberlain	2,189	40.9	+5.4
Alliance	R. Hewer	2,176	40.7	−1.8
Conservative	P. Walker	988	18.5	−3.5
Majority		13	0.2	−6.8
Turnout		5,353	52.7	+9.1
Labour hold		Swing	+3.6	

Atherton
Party	Candidate	Votes	%	±%
Labour	J. Sumner	2,647	72.9	+18.2
Conservative	B. France	600	16.5	−3.4
Alliance	J. Kelsall	384	10.6	−14.8
Majority		2,047	56.4	+27.0
Turnout		3,631	38.3	+4.7
Labour hold		Swing	+10.8	

Bedford-Astley
Party	Candidate	Votes	%	±%
Labour	H. Hayes	1,849	47.1	+3.4
Conservative	J. Davies	1,053	26.8	+0.4
Alliance	B. Aitken	1,026	26.1	−3.8
Majority		796	20.3	+6.5
Turnout		3,928	40.5	+2.2
Labour hold		Swing	+1.5	

Beech Hill
Party	Candidate	Votes	%	±%
Labour	H. Antill	1,989	57.7	+1.7
Alliance	P. Coleman	943	27.3	−0.7
Conservative	J. Wolstenholme	517	15.0	−1.0
Majority		1,046	30.3	+2.4
Turnout		3,449	38.7	+6.6
Labour hold		Swing	+1.2	

Bryn
Party	Candidate	Votes	%	±%
Labour	J. Foster	2,597	66.1	+15.0
Alliance	D. Seary	1,333	33.9	+2.0
Majority		1,264	32.2	+13.1
Turnout		3,930	39.9	+4.4
Labour hold		Swing	+6.5	

Hindley
Party	Candidate	Votes	%	±%
Labour	T. Isherwood	Unopposed	N/A	N/A
Labour hold		Swing	N/A	

Hindley Green
Party	Candidate	Votes	%	±%
Labour	H. Hayes	1,849	47.1	−1.8
Conservative	J. Davies	1,053	26.8	+2.2
Alliance	B. Aitken	1,026	26.1	−0.4
Majority		796	20.3	−2.1
Turnout		3,928	40.5	+13.2
Labour hold		Swing	-2.0	

Hindsford
Party	Candidate	Votes	%	±%
Labour	S. Little	2,302	66.2	+19.4
Alliance	W. Jones	1,176	33.8	−3.9
Majority		1,126	32.4	+23.3
Turnout		3,478	32.6	+0.0
Labour hold		Swing	+11.6	

Hope Carr
Party	Candidate	Votes	%	±%
Labour	F. Newton	2,222	54.7	+12.1
Conservative	E. Manson	1,335	32.9	+2.4
Alliance	J. Thomson	506	12.5	−14.5
Majority		887	21.8	+9.7
Turnout		4,063	42.6	+2.3
Labour hold		Swing	+4.8	

Ince
Party	Candidate	Votes	%	±%
Labour	D. Molyneaux	2,565	82.2	+10.2
Alliance	P. Coleman	555	17.8	−3.4
Majority		2,010	64.4	+13.6
Turnout		3,120	38.0	+11.2
Labour hold		Swing	+6.8	

Langtree
Party	Candidate	Votes	%	±%
Alliance	E. Hill	2,077	48.8	−2.0
Labour	P. Sawbridge	1,368	32.2	+2.6
Conservative	M. Clark	809	19.0	−0.6
Majority		709	16.7	−4.7
Turnout		4,254	41.5	+5.5
Alliance hold		Swing	-2.3	

Leigh Central
Party	Candidate	Votes	%	±%
Labour	P. Hull	2,179	74.0	+1.6
Conservative	S. Emerton	462	15.7	+1.6
Alliance	H. Crook	304	10.3	−3.2
Majority		1,717	58.3	−0.0
Turnout		2,945	32.6	+1.6
Labour hold		Swing	-0.0	

Leigh East
Party	Candidate	Votes	%	±%
Labour	D. Caley	1,836	52.7	−9.0
Conservative	M. Stewart	975	28.0	+28.0
Alliance	J. Hampson	675	19.4	−19.0
Majority		861	24.7	+1.3
Turnout		3,486	35.2	+7.7
Labour hold		Swing	-18.5	

Lightshaw
Party	Candidate	Votes	%	±%
Labour	B. Strett	2,733	64.5	+11.1
Conservative	M. Sharland	955	22.5	−2.0
Alliance	M. Beasley	551	13.0	−9.1
Majority		1,778	41.9	+13.1
Turnout		4,239	41.8	+4.4
Labour hold		Swing	+6.5	

Newtown
Party	Candidate	Votes	%	±%
Labour	M. Milligan	2,233	72.3	+6.7
Conservative	J. Lawson	457	14.8	+0.7
Alliance	P. Gibbons	399	12.9	−7.5
Majority		1,176	57.5	12.4
Turnout		3,089	33.7	+5.3
Labour hold		Swing	+3.0	

Norley
Party	Candidate	Votes	%	±%
Labour	J. Smith	2,441	78.6	−1.3
Alliance	R. Richardson	489	15.7	+2.7
Conservative	J. Davies	176	5.7	−1.4
Majority		1,952	62.8	−4.0
Turnout		3,106	36.8	+8.0
Labour hold		Swing	-2.0	

Orrell
Party	Candidate	Votes	%	±%
Labour	R. Capstick	1,726	41.2	+7.3
Conservative	A. Carroll	1,631	39.0	−1.1
Alliance	W. Hudson	828	19.8	−6.1
Majority		95	2.3	−3.9
Turnout		4,185	42.1	+3.7
Labour hold		Swing	+4.2	

Swinley
Party	Candidate	Votes	%	±%
Conservative	T. Peet	1,864	46.0	−0.9
Labour	K. Pye	1,366	33.7	+4.1
Alliance	H. Hughes	819	20.2	−3.1
Majority		498	12.3	−5.0
Turnout		4,049	44.6	+4.7
Labour hold		Swing	-2.5	

Tyldesley East
Party	Candidate	Votes	%	±%
Alliance	J. Dean	2,310	54.8	+3.9
Labour	F. Walker	1,902	45.2	−3.9
Majority		408	9.7	+7.7
Turnout		4,212	43.6	+7.4
Alliance gain from Labour		Swing	+3.9	

Whelley
Party	Candidate	Votes	%	±%
Labour	M. Pendleton	2,190	64.0	+7.0
Alliance	P. Wilson	776	22.7	−8.1
Conservative	C. Bond	454	13.3	+1.1
Majority		1,414	41.3	+15.1
Turnout		3,420	38.3	+4.6
Labour hold		Swing	+7.5	

Winstanley
Party	Candidate	Votes	%	±%
Labour	G. Taberner	1,730	39.6	+8.4
Alliance	C. Ryan	1,602	36.7	−4.2
Conservative	J. Michaels	1,038	23.8	−4.3
Majority		128	2.9	−6.8
Turnout		4,370	41.2	+7.9
Labour hold		Swing	+6.3	

Worsley Mesnes
Party	Candidate	Votes	%	±%
Labour	J. Baldwin	2,383	66.8	+3.4
Alliance	C. Hughes	764	21.4	−0.3
Conservative	J. Unsworth	423	11.8	−3.1
Majority		1,619	45.4	+3.8
Turnout		3,570	36.2	+9.4
Labour hold		Swing	+1.8	
