= 1995 Wigan Metropolitan Borough Council election =

1995 UK local government election

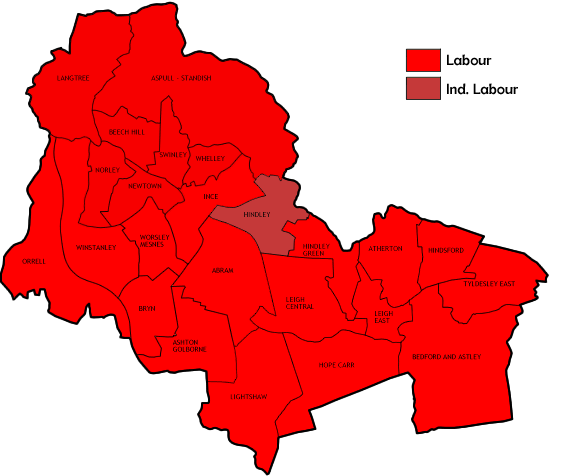
Map of the results of the 1995 Wigan council election.

Elections were held on Thursday, 4 May 1995, with one third of the seats set for re-election, with an extra vacancy in Leigh East. Ahead of this election Labour had gained the seat being fought in Beech Hill from the Liberal Democrats, and defended a seat in Worsley Mesnes in by-elections. The major parties marginally increased their number of candidates upon last year's totals, whereas the number of Independent Labour candidates fighting returned to just the incumbent in Hindley. Having been the only party opposing Labour in Atherton, the Independent Labour absence there meant that went uncontested this time round, alongside two of last year's unopposed wards, Ince and Leigh Central. In total unopposed wards were reduced from the previous year's four to three. Turnout fell to 26.4%, the second lowest in the council's history, only surpassing the 1992 nadir.

The election seen mixed fortunes for the main parties. For the Conservatives, this was their worst performance, with the lowest vote share (and at 10.2%, very close to dropping into single-digits) and vote figure obtained in their 22-year history of contesting for this council. Despite receiving near-two thousand fewer votes from the election the year before, Labour, however, beat the record share they'd recorded then, capturing 72.8% of votes cast. The Lib Dem vote fell further into the four-digit territory seen recently in their tumultuous merger period, but unlike then managed to stay within mid-teens in vote share.

With such an overwhelming vote, Labour captured every seat except the Independent Labour-held Hindley, making a total of four gains, and securing the largest majority since 1973. All but one were at the Lib Dem's expense, with their incumbent in Aspull-Standish standing for his third term ousted, their seat in Bedford-Astley fought and won by their previous incumbent for Labour and being reduced to one in the increasingly marginal, but one-time stronghold, ward of Langtree. The Conservatives suffered a loss to Labour in their only remaining favourable territory of Swinley, reducing their representation to an all-time low of one in both ward and council. The sole non-Labour victor in Hindley, standing under the title as Real Labour, seen her majority reduced.

== Election result ==
Wigan local election result 1995
Party	Seats	Gains	Losses	Net gain/loss	Seats %	Votes %	Votes	+/−
Labour	24	4	0	+4	96.0	72.8	39,936	+2.5%
Independent Labour	1	0	0	0	4.0	2.2	1,207	-0.1%
Liberal Democrats	0	0	3	-3	0.0	14.7	8,075	-1.3%
Conservative	0	0	1	-1	0.0	10.2	5,610	-1.1%

This result had the following consequences for the total number of seats on the Council after the elections:

Party	Previous council	New council
Labour	62	66
Liberal Democrats	7	4
Conservatives	2	1
Independent Labour	1	1
Total	72	72
Working majority	52	60

== Ward results ==
Abram
Party	Candidate	Votes	%	±%
Labour	B. Hampson	1,746	90.7	+0.9
Conservative	A. Eccles	178	9.2	−0.9
Majority		1,568	81.5	+1.8
Turnout		1,924	20.4	−3.5
Labour hold		Swing	+0.9	

Ashton-Golborne
Party	Candidate	Votes	%	±%
Labour	J. Hilton	1,965	76.8	−0.5
Conservative	M. Winstanley	376	14.7	+3.7
Liberal Democrats	S. Cooper	216	8.4	−3.2
Majority		1589	62.1	−3.5
Turnout		2,557	26.1	−3.5
Labour hold		Swing	-2.1	

Aspull-Standish
Party	Candidate	Votes	%	±%
Labour	D. Standring	1,726	48.9	+0.4
Liberal Democrats	G. Davies	1,494	42.4	+1.7
Conservative	J. Davies	306	8.7	−2.1
Majority		232	6.5	−1.3
Turnout		3,526	32.1	−5.2
Labour gain from Liberal Democrats		Swing	-0.6	

Atherton
Party	Candidate	Votes	%	±%
Labour	J. Sumner	Unopposed	N/A	N/A
Labour hold		Swing	N/A	

Bedford-Astley
Party	Candidate	Votes	%	±%
Labour	J. Lea	1,602	68.3	−0.4
Liberal Democrats	R. Bleakley	543	23.1	−8.1
Conservative	J. Mosley	200	8.5	+8.5
Majority		1,059	45.1	+7.6
Turnout		2,345	27.0	−1.7
Labour gain from Liberal Democrats		Swing	+3.8	

Beech Hill
Party	Candidate	Votes	%	±%
Labour	C. Roscoe	1,744	61.9	+14.0
Liberal Democrats	J. Beswick	965	34.2	−13.8
Conservative	J. Cartwright	109	3.9	−0.2
Majority		779	27.6	+27.5
Turnout		2,818	31.6	−5.7
Labour hold		Swing	+13.9	

Bryn
Party	Candidate	Votes	%	±%
Labour	J. Foster	2,385	87.5	+1.0
Conservative	W. Holmes	340	12.5	−1.0
Majority		2,045	75.0	+2.1
Turnout		2,725	27.7	−1.0
Labour hold		Swing	+1.0	

Hindley
Party	Candidate	Votes	%	±%
Independent Labour	E. Edwardson	1,207	50.3	+50.3
Labour	P. Kelly	984	41.0	−40.7
Liberal Democrats	F. Graham	206	8.6	−9.6
Majority		223	9.3	−54.2
Turnout		2,397	24.8	−0.0
Independent Labour hold		Swing	+45.5	

Hindley Green
Party	Candidate	Votes	%	±%
Labour	R. McAllister	1,893	81.0	−5.1
Liberal Democrats	J. Hough	228	9.7	+9.7
Conservative	C. Butterworth	217	9.3	−4.7
Majority		1,665	71.2	−0.9
Turnout		2,338	20.7	−3.9
Labour hold		Swing	-7.4	

Hindsford
Party	Candidate	Votes	%	±%
Labour	S. Little	1,898	74.2	N/A
Liberal Democrats	D. Soye	406	15.9	N/A
Conservative	R. Oxley	253	9.9	N/A
Majority		1,492	58.3	N/A
Turnout		2,557	23.7	N/A
Labour hold		Swing	N/A	

Hope Carr
Party	Candidate	Votes	%	±%
Labour	G. Brooks	1,859	57.1	+6.6
Liberal Democrats	P. Hough	1,090	33.5	−1.4
Conservative	D. Morris	307	9.4	−5.2
Majority		769	23.6	+8.1
Turnout		3,256	32.5	−3.0
Labour hold		Swing	+4.0	

Ince
Party	Candidate	Votes	%	±%
Labour	D. Molyneux	Unopposed	N/A	N/A
Labour hold		Swing	N/A	

Langtree
Party	Candidate	Votes	%	±%
Labour	M. Greenwood	2,067	63.0	+5.8
Liberal Democrats	T, Beswick	911	27.8	+0.2
Conservative	F. Parkinson	301	9.2	−0.5
Majority		1,156	35.2	+5.6
Turnout		3,279	28.6	−6.1
Labour gain from Liberal Democrats		Swing	+2.8	

Leigh Central
Party	Candidate	Votes	%	±%
Labour	B. Thomas	Unopposed	N/A	N/A
Labour hold		Swing	N/A	

Leigh East
Party	Candidate	Votes	%	±%
Labour	K. Cunliffe	1,849	71.0	+2.4
Labour	S. Kennedy	1,657		
Liberal Democrats	S. Hide	505	19.4	−12.0
Liberal Democrats	G. Waddup	465		
Conservative	A. Oxley	249	9.6	+9.6
Majority		1,344	51.6	+14.4
Turnout		2,603	25.8	−1.3
Labour hold		Swing		
Labour hold		Swing	+7.2	

Lightshaw
Party	Candidate	Votes	%	±%
Labour	B. Strett	2,923	83.3	+2.6
Conservative	C. Duffy	584	16.6	−2.6
Majority		2,339	66.7	+5.3
Turnout		3,507	31.8	−4.0
Labour hold		Swing	+2.6	

Newtown
Party	Candidate	Votes	%	±%
Labour	J. Birch	1,827	90.8	+5.7
Liberal Democrats	M. Wiswall	184	9.1	+1.2
Majority		1,643	81.7	+4.5
Turnout		2,011	22.8	−3.0
Labour hold		Swing	+2.2	

Norley
Party	Candidate	Votes	%	±%
Labour	S. Parker	1,819	92.4	+7.2
Liberal Democrats	A. Sudworth	150	7.6	−7.2
Majority		1,669	84.7	+14.4
Turnout		1,969	26.1	−4.3
Labour hold		Swing	+7.2	

Orrell
Party	Candidate	Votes	%	±%
Labour	R. Capstick	1,839	73.8	+3.1
Conservative	M. Green	654	26.2	−3.1
Majority		1,185	47.5	+6.1
Turnout		2,493	26.7	−5.2
Labour hold		Swing	+3.1	

Swinley
Party	Candidate	Votes	%	±%
Labour	J. Ball	1,606	59.7	−3.2
Conservative	K. Swift	781	29.0	−8.0
Liberal Democrats	A. Robinson	301	11.2	+11.2
Majority		825	30.7	+4.9
Turnout		2,688	30.3	−6.5
Labour gain from Conservative		Swing	+2.4	

Tyldesley East
Party	Candidate	Votes	%	±%
Labour	S. Hellier	2,109	70.6	N/A
Liberal Democrats	A. Pennington	876	29.3	N/A
Majority		1,233	41.3	N/A
Turnout		2,985	26.5	N/A
Labour hold		Swing	N/A	

Whelley
Party	Candidate	Votes	%	±%
Labour	M. Pendleton	1,859	90.9	+2.5
Conservative	T. Sharpe	185	9.0	−2.5
Majority		1,674	81.9	+5.1
Turnout		2,044	25.2	−3.7
Labour hold		Swing	+2.5	

Winstanley
Party	Candidate	Votes	%	±%
Labour	G. Roberts	2,324	86.4	+22.1
Conservative	G. Whiston	365	13.6	−0.7
Majority		1,959	72.8	+29.9
Turnout		2,689	22.7	−5.9
Labour hold		Swing	+11.4	

Worsley Mesnes
Party	Candidate	Votes	%	±%
Labour	J. Baldwin	1,912	90.3	+30.5
Conservative	T. Sutton	205	9.7	+4.2
Majority		1,707	80.6	+46.2
Turnout		2,117	21.2	−8.5
Labour hold		Swing	+13.1	
