= 2016 Wigan Metropolitan Borough Council election =

2016 local election in England

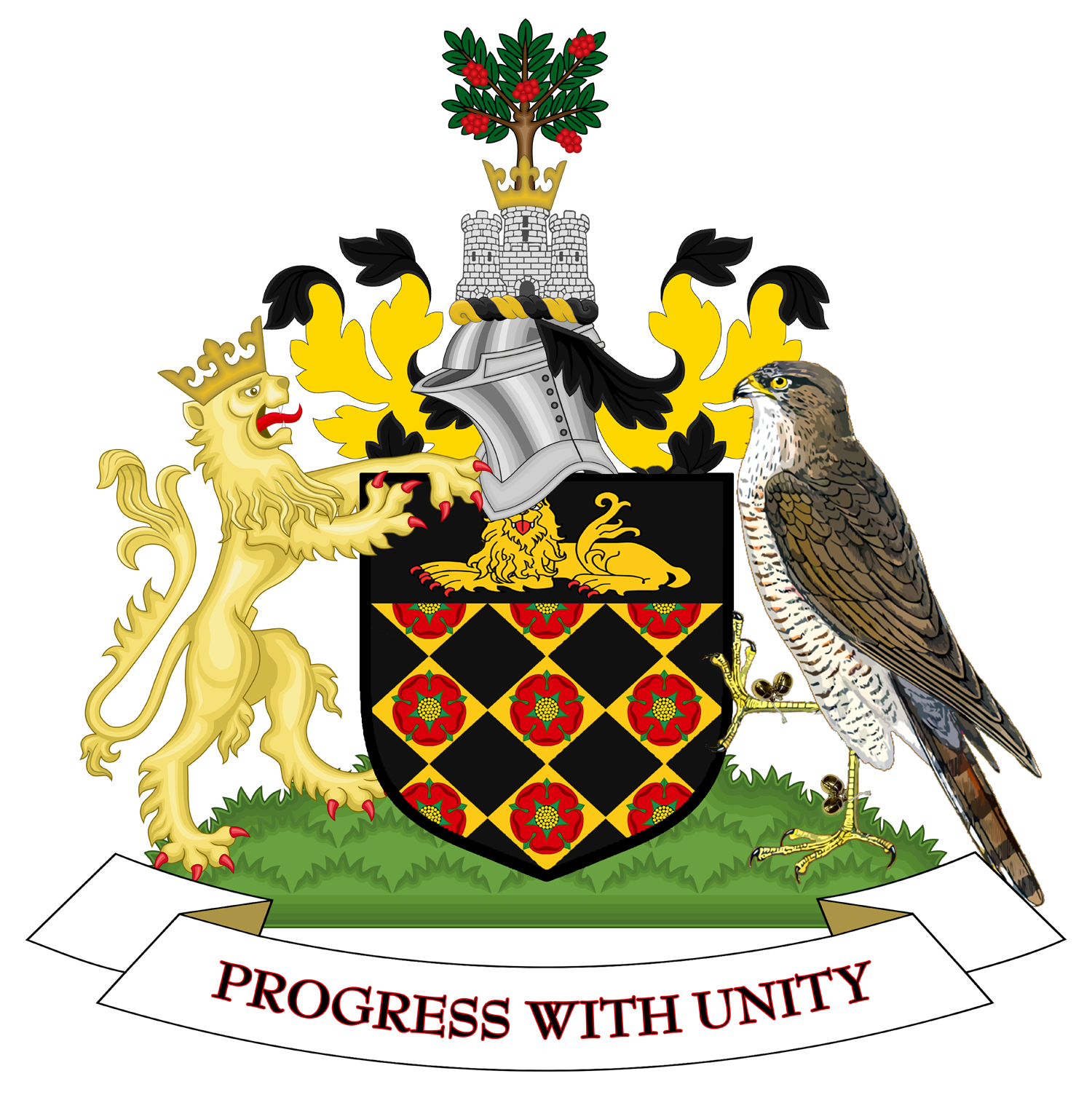
← 2015	5 May 2016	2018 →
Party	Labour	Conservative
- 2016 local election results in Wigan. Conservative Labour Labour and Co-operative Independent Network Independent

The 2016 Wigan Metropolitan Borough Council election took place on 5 May 2016 to elect members of Wigan Metropolitan Borough Council in England. This was on the same day as other local elections.

== Overview ==
Prior to the election, the composition of the council was:

- Labour Party: 64
- Conservative Party: 3
- Wigan Independents: 3
- Independent: 5

After the election, the composition of the council was:

- Labour Party: 65
- Conservative Party: 5
- Wigan Independents: 2
- Independent: 3

Number of Candidates fielded per party
Party	Number of Candidates
Labour Party (UK)	25
Conservative Party (UK)	25
UK Independence Party	18
Green Party of England and Wales	9
Liberal Democrats (UK)	7
Independents	7
Wigan Independents	3
TUSC	1

== Results summary ==
2016 Wigan Metropolitan Borough Council election
Party	This election			Full council			This election		
Party	Seats	Net	Seats %	Other	Total	Total %	Votes	Votes %	+/−
Labour	19	▲1	76	46	65	86.7	35,513	49.8	
Conservative	3	▲2	12	2	5	6.7	12,118	17.0	
Independent	3	▼1	12	0	3	4	7,279	10.2	
Wigan Independents	0	▼1	0	2	2	2.7	2,097	2.9	
UKIP	0	Steady	0	0	0	0	11,833	16.6	
Green	0	Steady	0	0	0	0	1,247	1.7	
Liberal Democrats	0	▼1	0	0	0	0	1,154	1.6	
TUSC	0	Steady	0	0	0	0	54	0.1	

== Ward results ==
=== Bolton West constituency ===
==== Atherton ward ====
Atherton
Party	Candidate	Votes	%	±%
Independent	Jamie Hodgkinson	1,838	51.3	
Labour	Elnur Yusifzade	969	27.0	
UKIP	Quinton John Smith	567	15.8	
Conservative	Brian Howard Lobell	209	5.8	
Majority		869	24.3	
Turnout		3,583	34.2	
Independent hold		Swing		

=== Leigh constituency ===
==== Astley Mosley Common ward ====
Astley Mosley Common
Party	Candidate	Votes	%	±%
Labour	Joanne Marie Platt	1,548	51.3	
Conservative	Richard Allan Short	739	24.5	
UKIP	Steve Mills	731	24.2	
Majority		809	26.8	
Turnout		3,018	33.0	
Labour hold		Swing		

==== Atherleigh ward ====
Atherleigh
Party	Candidate	Votes	%	±%
Labour	John Harding	1,067	46.4	
Independent	Stuart Andrew Gerrard	533	23.2	
UKIP	Luke Greenhalgh	446	19.4	
Conservative	Paul Lambert Fairhurst	207	9.0	
Liberal Democrats	Lorraine Gillon	49	2.1	
Majority		534	23.2	
Turnout		2,302	28.2	
Labour hold		Swing		

==== Golborne Lowton West ward ====
Golborne Lowton West
Party	Candidate	Votes	%	±%
Labour	Yvonne Marie Klieve	1,675	70.2	
UKIP	Peter Graham Kearns	540	22.6	
Conservative	Toby Joseph Hewitt	170	7.1	
Majority		1,135	47.6	
Turnout		2,385	27.8	
Labour hold		Swing		

==== Leigh East ward ====
Leigh East
Party	Candidate	Votes	%	±%
Labour	Keith Cunliffe	1,513	67.7	
Conservative	Richard Byrom Houlton	446	20.0	
Liberal Democrats	John Dowsett	275	12.3	
Majority		1,067	47.7	
Turnout		2,234	25.5	
Labour hold		Swing		

==== Leigh South ward ====
Leigh South
Party	Candidate	Votes	%	±%
Labour	Kevin Anderson	1,773	55.6	
UKIP	Russell Eddison	913	28.6	
Conservative	Denise Alison Young	503	15.8	
Majority		860	27.0	
Turnout		3,189	31.6	
Labour hold		Swing		

==== Leigh West ward ====
Leigh West
Party	Candidate	Votes	%	±%
Labour	Sue Greensmith	1,610	60.0	
UKIP	Jayson Lomax-Hargreaves	738	27.5	
Conservative	Andrew John Oxley	205	7.6	
Green	Neil Hancox	129	4.8	
Majority		872	32.5	
Turnout		2,682	26.8	
Labour hold		Swing		

==== Lowton East ward ====
Lowton East
Party	Candidate	Votes	%	±%
Conservative	James Nelson Grundy	2,327	60.9	
Labour	Garry Lloyd	1,110	29.1	
UKIP	Stephen Thomas Darragh	278	7.3	
Green	Harry John Alderson Snape	104	2.7	
Majority		1,217	31.8	
Turnout		3,819	40.3	
Conservative hold		Swing		

==== Tyldesley ward ====
Tyldesley
Party	Candidate	Votes	%	±%
Labour	Nazia Rehman	1,235	38.5	
UKIP	Matthew Robert James	978	30.5	
Independent	Norman Alec Bradbury	572	17.8	
Conservative	David John Stirzaker	421	13.1	
Majority		257	8.0	
Turnout		3,206	31.7	
Labour gain from Liberal Democrats		Swing		

=== Makerfield constituency ===
==== Abram ward ====
Abram
Party	Candidate	Votes	%	±%
Labour	Martyn Smethurst	1,495	58.3	
UKIP	Jim Carmichael	868	33.9	
Conservative	Claire Houlton	201	7.8	
Majority		627	24.4	
Turnout		2,564	25.5	
Labour hold		Swing		

==== Ashton ward ====
Ashton
Party	Candidate	Votes	%	±%
Labour	Bill Clarke	1,204	46.5	
Independent	Richard Charles Aylett	616	23.8	
UKIP	Stuart Thomas Plimley	426	16.5	
Conservative	Marie Winstanley	253	9.8	
Liberal Democrats	Lesley Barbara Brothwood	89	3.4	
Majority		588	22.7	
Turnout		2,588	29.6	
Labour hold		Swing		

==== Bryn ward ====
Bryn
Party	Candidate	Votes	%	±%
Independent	Steve Jones	1,200	41.1	
Labour	David Hurst	1,123	38.4	
UKIP	Thomas Keith Miller	438	15.0	
Conservative	Margaret Mary Winstanley	161	5.5	
Majority		77	2.7	
Turnout		2,922	33.6	
Independent gain from Independent		Swing		

==== Hindley ward ====
Hindley
Party	Candidate	Votes	%	±%
Labour	Paul John Blay	1,413	51.2	
Independent	Jim Ellis	1,040	37.7	
Conservative	David Marcus John Ollerton	153	5.5	
Green	Paul Ravenall	79	2.9	
Liberal Democrats	John Skipworth	76	2.8	
Majority		373	13.5	
Turnout		2,761	29.4	
Labour gain from Independent		Swing		

==== Hindley Green ward ====
Hindley Green
Party	Candidate	Votes	%	±%
Independent	Bob Brierley	1,480	57.3	
Labour	Eileen Winifred Rigby	820	31.7	
Liberal Democrats	John Thomason	159	6.2	
Conservative	Gerard Joseph Houlton	126	4.9	
Majority		660	25.6	
Turnout		2,585	27.4	
Independent hold		Swing		

==== Orrell ward ====
Orrell
Party	Candidate	Votes	%	±%
Conservative	Michael William Winstanley	1,410	43.2	
Labour	Joy Susan Bradley	1,333	40.8	
Orrell Independents	Paula Lynn Boyham	221	6.8	
Green	Denise Capstick	190	5.8	
Liberal Democrats	Louise Catherine Bowe	110	3.4	
Majority		77	2.4	
Turnout		3,264	34.9	
Conservative gain from Labour		Swing		

"Orrell Independents" is a description used by candidates for the Wigan Independents.

==== Winstanley ward ====
Winstanley
Party	Candidate	Votes	%	±%
Labour	Paul Terence Kenny	1,350	48.2	
UKIP	Andrew Francis Collinson	890	31.8	
Conservative	Jean Margaret Peet	334	11.9	
Green	Steven Charles Heyes	229	8.2	
Majority		460	16.4	
Turnout		2,803	31.5	
Labour hold		Swing		

==== Worsley Mesnes ward ====
Worsley Mesnes
Party	Candidate	Votes	%	±%
Labour	Philip Myles Kelly	1,449	59.9	
UKIP	Maureen McCoy	699	28.9	
Conservative	Susan Atherton	221	9.1	
Majority		800	31.0	
Turnout		2,419	27.7	
Labour hold		Swing		

=== Wigan constituency ===
==== Aspull, New Springs and Whelley ward ====
Aspull, New Springs and Whelley
Party	Candidate	Votes	%	±%
Labour	John Hilton	1,805	52.8	
UKIP	Mark Andrew Bradley	985	28.8	
Conservative	Allan Atherton	456	13.3	
Liberal Democrats	Freda Janet Graham	175	5.1	
Majority		820	24.0	
Turnout		3,421	35.1	
Labour hold		Swing		

==== Douglas ward ====
Douglas
Party	Candidate	Votes	%	±%
Labour	Patricia Draper	1,803	84.1	
Conservative	Margaret Atherton	340	15.9	
Majority		1,463	68.2	
Turnout		2,143	23.3	
Labour hold		Swing		

==== Ince ward ====
Ince
Party	Candidate	Votes	%	±%
Labour	David Trevor Molyneux	1,545	65.8	
UKIP	Stephen Winstanley	671	28.6	
Conservative	Judith Atherton	132	5.6	
Majority		874	37.2	
Turnout		2,348	27.3	
Labour hold		Swing		

==== Pemberton ward ====
Pemberton
Party	Candidate	Votes	%	±%
Labour	Jeanette Prescott	1,631	69.0	
UKIP	Peter Owen Wheatley-Smith	502	21.2	
Conservative	Daniel Andrew Whitehouse	137	5.8	
Green	Norma Stout	93	3.9	
Majority		1,129	47.7	
Turnout		2,363	24.9	
Labour hold		Swing		

==== Shevington with Lower Ground ward ====
Shevington with Lower Ground
Party	Candidate	Votes	%	±%
Labour	Damian Edwardson	1,239	40.0	
Shevington Independents	Janet Brown	813	26.3	
UKIP	Arnold Jefferson Foster	584	18.9	
Conservative	Jack Joseph Vickery	349	11.3	
Green	Joseph Robert Rylance	112	3.6	
Majority		426	13.7	
Turnout		3,097	34.2	
Labour hold		Swing		

"Shevington Independents" is a description used by candidates for the Wigan Independents.

==== Standish with Langtree ward ====
Standish with Langtree
Party	Candidate	Votes	%	±%
Conservative	Raymond Whittingham	1,276	32.4	
Standish Independents	Gareth William Fairhurst	1,063	27.0	
Labour	Debbie Parkinson	968	24.6	
UKIP	Ian Adamczyk	579	14.7	
TUSC	Sharon Holden	54	1.4	
Majority		213	5.4	
Turnout		3,940	41.4	
Conservative gain from Standish Independents		Swing		

"Standish Independents" is a description used by candidates for the Wigan Independents.

==== Wigan Central ward ====
Wigan Central
Party	Candidate	Votes	%	±%
Labour	Lawrence Hunt	1,745	55.9	
Conservative	Susan Vickery	845	27.1	
Green	William John Patterson	311	10.0	
Liberal Democrats	Stuart David Thomas	221	7.0	
Majority		900	28.8	
Turnout		3,122	34.7	
Labour hold		Swing		

==== Wigan West ward ====
Wigan West
Party	Candidate	Votes	%	±%
Labour	Terence William Halliwell	2,090	80.8	
Conservative	Jamie Vickery	497	19.2	
Majority		1,593	61.6	
Turnout		2,587	27.9	
Labour hold		Swing		

== By-elections between 2016 and 2018 ==
=== Astley Mosley Common ward ===
Astley Mosley Common, 19 October 2017
Party	Candidate	Votes	%	±%
Labour	Paula Anne Wakefield	773	46.0	▼5.3
Conservative	David John Stirzaker	604	35.9	▲11.4
UKIP	Allan Hogg	185	11.0	▼13.2
Liberal Democrats	Stuart David Thomas	73	4.3	New
Green	Andy Prentice	46	2.7	New
Majority		169	10.1	▼16.7
Turnout		1,681	17.5	▼15.5
Labour hold		Swing		

=== Shevington with Lower Ground ward ===
Shevington with Lower Ground, 14 December 2017
Party	Candidate	Votes	%	±%
Labour	Marlaine Teresa Whitham	765	43.4	▲3.4
Shevington Independents	Janet Brown	552	31.3	▲5.0
Conservative	Callum David Owen Chadwick	402	22.8	▲11.5
Green	Joseph Robert Rylance	30	1.7	▼1.9
Liberal Democrats	Joshua Michael Hindle	15	0.9	New
Majority		213	12.1	▼1.6
Turnout		1,764	18.7	▼15.5
Labour hold		Swing		

"Shevington Independents" is a description used by candidates for the Wigan Independents.
