= 1991 Wigan Metropolitan Borough Council election =

1991 UK local government election

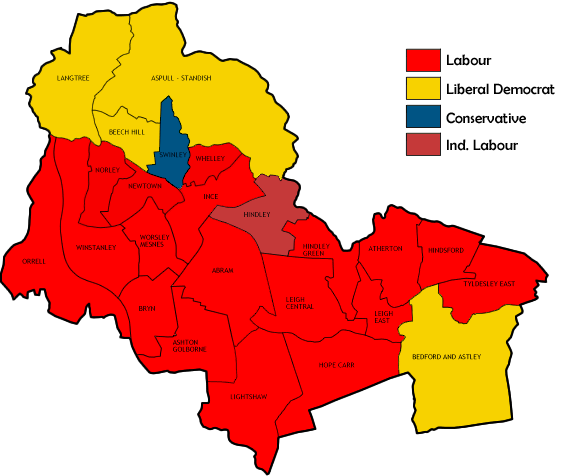
Map of the results of the 1991 Wigan council election.

Elections to the Wigan council were held on Thursday, 2 May 1991, with one third scheduled for re-election. Like the last election, this seen a wider variety of party candidates than most previous, but only marginally improved upon the nadir of the year before in terms of candidates, with four wards uncontested (the record low until beaten last year), Conservatives fighting just above one half of the seats and the Liberal Democrats just under - although the Lib Dems near doubled last year's total, both were historically disappointing. Minor party participation consisted of three Independent Labour candidates - including a former Beech Hill Labour councillor - two Liberals, a return of an Independent in Hindley Green and one remaining Green - their lowest fielded when participating - in Atherton.

Results on the night largely turned out to be the converse of the 1988 election with Labour suffering a significant fall in their vote share, mostly to the advantage of the Lib Dems, as they decisively won back second place. There were three gains in total, with two Lib Dem gains from Labour and one vice versa. The Lib Dems achieved a notable gain in the unblemished Labour ward of Bedford-Astley, as well as a second gain in the once consistently-Labour Beech Hill. Labour managed to return Winstanley to sole Labour representation again, but their total of 18 seats was the lowest accomplished in just under a decade for them. Elsewhere the Conservative's successfully defended Swinley this time around, and the Independent Labour comfortably held Hindley. Turnout fell to a fairly average figure of 34.5%.

== Election result ==
Wigan local election result 1991
Party	Seats	Gains	Losses	Net gain/loss	Seats %	Votes %	Votes	+/−
Labour	18	1	2	-1	75.0	58.0	39,434	-11.2%
Liberal Democrats	4	2	1	+1	16.7	19.9	13,578	+8.7%
Conservative	1	0	0	0	4.2	15.1	10,251	+1.9%
Independent Labour	1	0	0	0	4.2	3.4	2,311	+3.4%
Liberal	0	0	0	0	0.0	1.8	1,215	+0.2%
Independent	0	0	0	0	0.0	1.2	820	+0.3%
Green	0	0	0	0	0.0	0.6	424	-2.7%

This result had the following consequences for the total number of seats on the Council after the elections:

Party	Previous council	New council
Labour	64	63
Liberal Democrats	5	6
Conservatives	2	2
Independent Labour	1	1
Liberal	0	0
Independent	0	0
Green	0	0
Total	72	72
Working majority	56	54

== Ward results ==
Abram
Party	Candidate	Votes	%	±%
Labour	B. Hampson	2,373	83.7	N/A
Conservative	J. Horsewell	461	16.3	N/A
Majority		1,912	67.4	N/A
Turnout		2,834	29.2	N/A
Labour hold		Swing	N/A	

Ashton-Golborne
Party	Candidate	Votes	%	±%
Labour	J. Hilton	2,191	73.0	−6.0
Conservative	A. Calder	809	27.0	+6.0
Majority		1,382	46.0	−12.0
Turnout		3,000	30.5	−6.1
Labour hold		Swing	-6.0	

Aspull-Standish
Party	Candidate	Votes	%	±%
Liberal Democrats	G. Davies	2,376	50.7	+20.6
Labour	T. Mugan	1,782	38.1	−15.2
Conservative	J. Carrington	524	11.2	−5.3
Majority		594	16.6	−10.4
Turnout		4,682	43.0	−3.1
Liberal Democrats hold		Swing	+17.9	

Atherton
Party	Candidate	Votes	%	±%
Labour	J. Summer	2,027	75.3	−5.0
Green	S. Bickerton	424	15.7	−3.9
Independent Labour	D. Graeme	242	9.0	+9.0
Majority		1,603	59.6	−1.1
Turnout		2,693	29.1	−6.2
Labour hold		Swing	-0.5	

Bedford-Astley
Party	Candidate	Votes	%	±%
Liberal Democrats	J. Lea	1,812	51.4	+51.4
Labour	H. Hayes	1,713	48.6	−21.8
Majority		99	2.8	−38.1
Turnout		3,525	35.5	+1.6
Liberal Democrats gain from Labour		Swing	+36.6	

Beech Hill
Party	Candidate	Votes	%	±%
Liberal Democrats	V. Milton	1,992	54.1	+5.2
Labour	S. Shaw	1,188	32.3	−18.9
Independent Labour	J. Parkinson	320	8.7	+8.7
Conservative	A. Porter	182	4.9	+4.9
Majority		804	21.8	+19.5
Turnout		3,682	41.9	−4.6
Liberal Democrats gain from Labour		Swing	+12.0	

Bryn
Party	Candidate	Votes	%	±%
Labour	J. Foster	2,540	80.6	−0.1
Conservative	B. Smith	610	19.4	+0.1
Majority		1,930	61.3	−0.2
Turnout		3,150	32.3	−2.6
Labour hold		Swing	-0.1	

Hindley
Party	Candidate	Votes	%	±%
Independent Labour	E. Edwardson	1,749	62.4	+62.4
Labour	T. Bailey	1,053	37.6	−37.1
Majority		696	24.8	−34.1
Turnout		2,802	29.0	−7.9
Independent Labour hold		Swing	+49.7	

Hindley Green
Party	Candidate	Votes	%	±%
Labour	R. McAllister	2,027	71.2	−1.0
Independent	J. Vickers	820	28.8	+11.3
Majority		1,207	42.4	−12.3
Turnout		2,847	24.7	−7.9
Labour hold		Swing	-6.1	

Hindsford
Party	Candidate	Votes	%	±%
Labour	S. Little	Unopposed	N/A	N/A
Labour hold		Swing	N/A	

Hope Carr
Party	Candidate	Votes	%	±%
Labour	L. Birtles	1,561	40.9	−8.0
Liberal Democrats	J. Croft	1,491	39.1	−12.0
Conservative	J. Midgley	764	20.0	+20.0
Majority		70	1.8	−0.4
Turnout		3,816	38.1	+0.3
Labour hold		Swing	+2.0	

Ince
Party	Candidate	Votes	%	±%
Labour	D. Molyneaux	2,217	84.1	N/A
Liberal Democrats	J. Shaw	420	15.9	N/A
Majority		1,797	68.2	N/A
Turnout		2,637	33.5	N/A
Labour hold		Swing	N/A	

Langtree
Party	Candidate	Votes	%	±%
Liberal Democrats	S. Jeffers	2,003	39.0	+21.9
Labour	M. Gallagher	1,811	35.2	−14.1
Liberal	K. White	819	15.9	−5.9
Conservative	J. Davies	507	9.8	−1.8
Majority		192	3.7	−23.8
Turnout		5,140	45.4	−1.5
Liberal Democrats hold		Swing	+18.0	

Leigh Central
Party	Candidate	Votes	%	±%
Labour	B. Thomas	1,722	59.6	N/A
Liberal Democrats	R. Whalley	1,166	40.4	N/A
Majority		556	19.2	N/A
Turnout		2,888	32.1	N/A
Labour hold		Swing	N/A	

Leigh East
Party	Candidate	Votes	%	±%
Labour	S. Kennedy	Unopposed	N/A	N/A
Labour hold		Swing	N/A	

Lightshaw
Party	Candidate	Votes	%	±%
Labour	B. Strett	3,063	66.1	−9.8
Conservative	S. Hide	1,570	33.9	+9.8
Majority		1,493	32.2	−19.6
Turnout		4,633	43.2	−0.7
Labour hold		Swing	-9.8	

Newtown
Party	Candidate	Votes	%	±%
Labour	M. Milligan	2,090	75.6	−13.9
Liberal Democrats	L. Brooks	673	24.3	+24.3
Majority		1,417	51.3	−27.9
Turnout		2,763	30.0	−9.2
Labour hold		Swing	-19.1	

Norley
Party	Candidate	Votes	%	±%
Labour	S. Parker	Unopposed	N/A	N/A
Labour hold		Swing	N/A	

Orrell
Party	Candidate	Votes	%	±%
Labour	R. Capstick	1,959	52.3	−15.7
Conservative	H. Melling	1,354	36.2	+4.2
Liberal Democrats	J. Lancaster	429	11.4	+11.4
Majority		605	16.2	−19.9
Turnout		3,742	36.5	−2.5
Labour hold		Swing	-9.9	

Swinley
Party	Candidate	Votes	%	±%
Conservative	J. Wolstenholme	1,974	51.7	+3.9
Labour	A. Bullen	1,842	48.3	−3.9
Majority		132	3.4	−0.8
Turnout		3,816	43.0	−6.1
Conservative hold		Swing	+3.9	

Tyldesley East
Party	Candidate	Votes	%	±%
Labour	R. Hopkinson	Unopposed	N/A	N/A
Labour hold		Swing	N/A	

Whelley
Party	Candidate	Votes	%	±%
Labour	M. Pendleton	2,116	69.8	−9.1
Liberal	K. Smith	396	13.0	+13.0
Conservative	F. Sidebotham	361	11.9	+0.9
Liberal Democrats	H. Wagner	160	5.3	+5.3
Majority		1,720	56.7	−11.2
Turnout		3,033	34.4	−3.7
Labour hold		Swing	-11.0	

Winstanley
Party	Candidate	Votes	%	±%
Labour	G. Roberts	1,956	53.3	−10.0
Liberal Democrats	V. Gasteen	1,056	28.7	+7.9
Conservative	I. Cunliffe	660	18.0	+2.1
Majority		900	24.5	−18.0
Turnout		3,672	31.3	−6.2
Labour gain from Liberal Democrats		Swing	-8.9	

Worsley Mesnes
Party	Candidate	Votes	%	±%
Labour	J. Baldwin	2,203	82.2	−10.1
Conservative	R. Clayton	475	17.7	+10.1
Majority		1,728	64.5	−20.2
Turnout		2,678	27.3	−5.8
Labour hold		Swing	-10.1	
