= 1978 Wigan Metropolitan Borough Council election =

1978 UK local government election

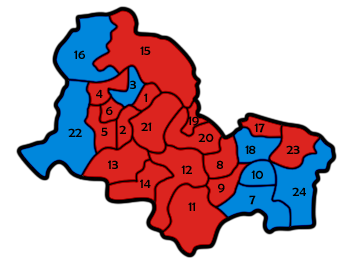
Map of the results for the 1978 Wigan council election. Labour in red and Conservatives in blue.

Elections to Wigan Council were held on 4 May 1978, with one third of the council up for election as well as vacancies in Ward 2 and 17. Previous to the election, a Labour councillor in Ward 9 defected to become an Independent Labour, reducing Labour's majority to 38. This seat was up for vote and became the only Labour gain of the night, as they suffered five losses to the Conservatives, and their majority reduced to 30 - half of what it was in 1973. The election seen a first of all wards being contested, with turnout rising marginally to 34.7%.

== Election result ==
Wigan local election result 1978
Party	Seats	Gains	Losses	Net gain/loss	Seats %	Votes %	Votes	+/−
Labour	19	1	5	-4	73.1	54.3	42,687	+3.0%
Conservative	7	5	0	+5	26.9	43.6	34,337	+2.8%
Liberal	0	0	0	0	0.0	1.7	1,331	-2.2%
Communist	0	0	0	0	0.0	0.2	147	-0.2%
Independent Labour	0	0	1	-1	0.0	0.2	146	+0.2%

This result had the following consequences for the total number of seats on the Council after the elections:

Party	Previous council	New council
Labour	55	51
Conservatives	14	19
Liberals	1	1
Independent	1	1
Independent Labour	1	0
Total	72	72
Working majority	38	30

== Ward results ==
Ward 1 (Lindsay-Scholes-Whelley)
Party	Candidate	Votes	%	±%
Labour	W. Pendleton	1,980	62.9	−0.2
Conservative	C. Giles	1,170	37.1	+0.2
Majority		810	25.8	−0.4
Turnout		3,150	34.3	+1.2
Labour hold		Swing	-0.2	

Ward 2 (Poolstock-Worsley Mesnes)
Party	Candidate	Votes	%	±%
Labour	W. Brogan	1,744	66.8	+4.3
Labour	H. Antill	1,587		
Conservative	C. Rogers	866	33.2	+9.5
Conservative	R. Rogers	837		
Majority		878	33.6	−5.3
Turnout		2,610	29.2	+4.5
Labour hold		Swing		
Labour hold		Swing	-2.6	

Ward 3 (Gidlow-Swinley-Whitley)
Party	Candidate	Votes	%	±%
Conservative	H. Dowling	2,731	70.5	+1.3
Labour	M. Pendleton	1,143	29.5	−1.3
Majority		1,588	41.0	+2.6
Turnout		3,874	34.2	+0.8
Conservative hold		Swing	+1.3	

Ward 4 (Beech Hill and Marsh Green)
Party	Candidate	Votes	%	±%
Labour	E. Naylor	1,892	68.5	N/A
Conservative	A. Atherton	869	31.5	N/A
Majority		1,023	37.1	N/A
Turnout		2,761	29.4	N/A
Labour hold		Swing	N/A	

Ward 5 (Highfield and Lamberhead)
Party	Candidate	Votes	%	±%
Labour	G. Barlow	1,553	52.4	−1.0
Conservative	A. Foster	1,412	47.6	+1.0
Majority		141	4.8	−2.0
Turnout		2,965	26.1	−0.3
Labour hold		Swing	-1.0	

Ward 6 (Newtown and Rose Hill)
Party	Candidate	Votes	%	±%
Labour	A. Peet	1,591	66.5	+4.5
Conservative	J. Lawson	801	33.5	+5.5
Majority		790	33.0	−0.9
Turnout		2,392	27.6	+0.2
Labour hold		Swing	-0.5	

Ward 7 (Hope Carr)
Party	Candidate	Votes	%	±%
Conservative	R. Goodwin	1,711	56.2	−0.0
Labour	A. Roberts	1,334	43.8	+0.0
Majority		377	12.4	−0.1
Turnout		3,045	43.3	−1.6
Conservative gain from Labour		Swing	-0.0	

Ward 8 (St Pauls and St Peters)
Party	Candidate	Votes	%	±%
Labour	G. Macdonald	1,542	62.6	+3.8
Conservative	W. Lackenby	830	33.7	−3.4
Communist	H. Kedward	90	3.7	−0.4
Majority		712	28.9	+7.1
Turnout		2,462	27.2	+1.4
Labour hold		Swing	+3.6	

Ward 9 (Etherstone and St Marys)
Party	Candidate	Votes	%	±%
Labour	P. Smith	1,386	46.6	−4.9
Conservative	H. Davies	1,385	46.6	+1.1
Independent Labour	E. Moore	146	4.9	+4.9
Communist	K. James	57	1.9	−1.0
Majority		1	0.0	−6.0
Turnout		2,974	33.0	−2.3
Labour gain from Independent Labour		Swing	-3.0	

Ward 10 (Lilford-St Josephs-St Thomas)
Party	Candidate	Votes	%	±%
Conservative	G. Wyatt	2,042	57.2	+4.6
Labour	H. Smith	1,528	42.8	−1.2
Majority		514	14.4	+5.8
Turnout		3,570	40.3	+0.2
Conservative gain from Labour		Swing	+2.9	

Ward 11 (Golborne St Thomas and Lowton)
Party	Candidate	Votes	%	±%
Labour	N. Holt	2,468	58.2	−0.5
Conservative	T. Thompson	1,776	41.8	+0.5
Majority		692	16.3	−1.0
Turnout		4,244	40.7	+1.0
Labour hold		Swing	-0.5	

Ward 12 (Golborne Heath Park and Ashton)
Party	Candidate	Votes	%	±%
Labour	J. Hilton	2,116	64.9	−5.4
Conservative	J. Harrison	1,146	35.1	+5.4
Majority		970	29.7	−10.7
Turnout		3,262	36.7	−1.2
Labour hold		Swing	-5.4	

Ward 13 (Ashton-in-Makerfield North and West)
Party	Candidate	Votes	%	±%
Labour	A. Heckles	1,695	62.8	−4.8
Conservative	B. Smith	1,003	37.2	+37.2
Majority		692	25.6	−9.6
Turnout		2,698	35.5	+3.5
Labour hold		Swing	-21.0	

Ward 14 (Ashton-in-Makerfield Central and East)
Party	Candidate	Votes	%	±%
Labour	S. Lea	1,645	56.7	+4.2
Conservative	M. Ball	1,257	43.3	+14.3
Majority		388	13.4	−10.1
Turnout		2,902	32.5	−5.4
Labour hold		Swing	-5.0	

Ward 15 (Standish with Langtree and Shevington)
Party	Candidate	Votes	%	±%
Labour	G. Pullin	1,981	39.8	+4.4
Conservative	E. Howard	1,911	38.4	+9.7
Liberal	J. Pigot	1,089	21.9	+21.9
Majority		70	1.4	+0.8
Turnout		4,981	42.2	+3.4
Labour hold		Swing	-2.6	

Ward 16 (Aspull)
Party	Candidate	Votes	%	±%
Conservative	J. Wild	1,942	48.0	+0.8
Labour	A. Singer	1,860	46.0	+6.3
Liberal	K. Mason	242	6.0	−7.1
Majority		82	2.0	−1.4
Turnout		4,044	41.7	+7.5
Conservative gain from Labour		Swing	-2.7	

Ward 17 (Atherton North East)
Party	Candidate	Votes	%	±%
Labour	J. Clarke	2,590	72.1	+5.6
Labour	W. Murphy	2,115		
Conservative	M. Sharland	1,001	27.9	−5.6
Conservative	B. France	895		
Majority		1,589	44.2	+11.2
Turnout		3,591	34.1	+0.6
Labour hold		Swing		
Labour hold		Swing	+5.6	

Ward 18 (Atherton South West)
Party	Candidate	Votes	%	±%
Conservative	D. Williams	1,435	52.5	−6.8
Labour	J. Sumner	1,296	47.5	+6.8
Majority		139	5.1	−13.6
Turnout		2,731	42.1	+4.4
Conservative gain from Labour		Swing	-6.8	

Ward 19 (Hindley Central and North)
Party	Candidate	Votes	%	±%
Labour	C. Priestley	1,558	68.5	+1.8
Conservative	L. McGreal	716	31.5	−1.8
Majority		842	37.0	+3.6
Turnout		2,274	30.9	+2.8
Labour hold		Swing	+1.8	

Ward 20 (Hindley South East and West)
Party	Candidate	Votes	%	±%
Labour	G. Harrison	1,720	55.8	+6.0
Conservative	T. Whitfield	1,361	44.2	+5.2
Majority		359	11.7	+0.8
Turnout		3,081	28.3	−1.7
Labour hold		Swing	+0.4	

Ward 21 (Ince-in-Makerfield)
Party	Candidate	Votes	%	±%
Labour	R. Taylor	2,553	71.7	N/A
Conservative	M. Jones	1,006	28.3	N/A
Majority		1,547	43.5	N/A
Turnout		3,559	31.8	N/A
Labour hold		Swing	N/A	

Ward 22 (Orrell and Billinge)
Party	Candidate	Votes	%	±%
Conservative	J. Hitchen	2,723	55.3	+11.2
Labour	J. Whittle	2,201	44.7	+9.6
Majority		522	10.6	+1.5
Turnout		4,924	35.7	+3.2
Conservative gain from Labour		Swing	+0.8	

Ward 23 (Tyldesley - Shakerley)
Party	Candidate	Votes	%	±%
Labour	S. Little	1,744	51.9	−1.8
Conservative	L. Knowles	1,614	48.1	+1.8
Majority		130	3.8	−3.6
Turnout		3,358	37.5	−1.0
Labour hold		Swing	-1.8	

Ward 24 (Tyldesley - Astley Green and Blackmoor)
Party	Candidate	Votes	%	±%
Conservative	S. Emerton	1,629	51.0	−4.5
Labour	R. Rawson	1,567	49.0	+4.5
Majority		62	2.0	−9.0
Turnout		3,196	41.4	−1.2
Conservative gain from Labour		Swing	-4.5	
