= 1992 Wigan Metropolitan Borough Council election =

1992 UK local government election

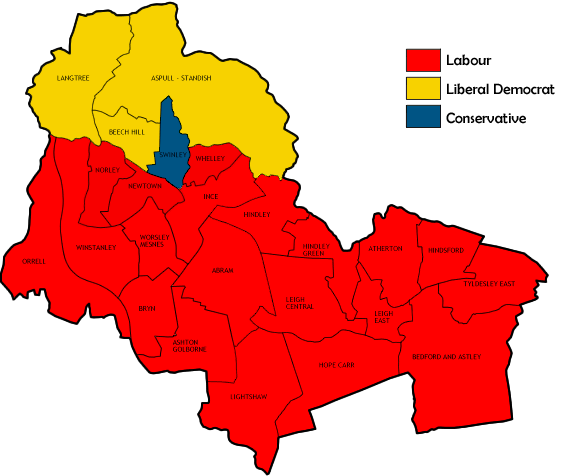
Map of the results of the 1992 Wigan council election.

Elections to the Wigan council were held on Thursday, 7 May 1992, with one third of the seats set for re-election. Before the election the Labour Party had successfully retained their seats in three by-elections for the wards of Aspull-Standish, Leigh Central and Norley. The two elections directly preceding 1992's were markedly poor in participation, in contrast this year all wards were fought with the Conservative's and Lib Dem's return to fighting over three quarters of the wards each. Despite this, the election obtained the indisputably worst turnout in the council's near-twenty-year history, at a meagre 23.6%, losing just shy of 12,000 votes from the previous election. The elections were fought one month after the 1992 general election with heavy implications on the results - the most obvious of which is the nationally defeated Labour's loss of 8,000 votes from one year before, and consequently obtaining their worst vote figure in sixteen years. Neither the Conservatives rise - nor the Lib Dem's loss - of around 2,000 each, were significantly removed from recent results or accounted for such a loss, suggesting the slump in turnout were mostly the part of dismayed Labour voters. Seat changes were restricted to two Lib Dems gains from Labour, with one in the Labour-Lib Dem battleground of Aspull-Standish, returning the balance of councillor's in the latter's favour by two to one, and regaining one of their losses in the favourable territory of Langtree.

== Election result ==
Wigan local election result 1992
Party	Seats	Gains	Losses	Net gain/loss	Seats %	Votes %	Votes	+/−
Labour	20	0	2	-2	83.3	55.7	31,269	-2.3%
Liberal Democrats	3	2	0	+2	12.5	20.1	11,299	+0.2%
Conservative	1	0	0	0	4.2	21.5	12,045	+6.4%
Liberal	0	0	0	0	0.0	1.5	873	-0.3%
Independent Labour	0	0	0	0	0.0	0.9	488	-2.5%
Independent	0	0	0	0	0.0	0.2	104	-0.8%

This result had the following consequences for the total number of seats on the Council after the elections:

Party	Previous council	New council
Labour	63	61
Liberal Democrats	6	8
Conservatives	2	2
Independent Labour	1	1
Liberal	0	0
Independent	0	0
Total	72	72
Working majority	54	50

== Ward results ==
Abram
Party	Candidate	Votes	%	±%
Labour	A. Bennett	1,442	80.2	−3.5
Conservative	I. Cunliffe	356	19.8	+3.5
Majority		1,086	60.4	−7.1
Turnout		1,798	18.5	−10.6
Labour hold		Swing	-3.5	

Ashton-Golborne
Party	Candidate	Votes	%	±%
Labour	T. Jones	1,130	57.8	−15.2
Conservative	A. Calder	527	26.9	−0.0
Liberal Democrats	C. Barton	299	15.3	+15.3
Majority		603	30.8	−15.2
Turnout		1,956	19.7	−10.8
Labour hold		Swing	-7.6	

Aspull-Standish
Party	Candidate	Votes	%	±%
Liberal Democrats	J. Ball	1,599	46.1	−4.7
Labour	D. Standring	1,197	34.5	−3.6
Conservative	J. Davies	674	19.4	+8.2
Majority		402	11.6	−1.1
Turnout		3,470	32.0	−11.0
Liberal Democrats gain from Labour		Swing	-0.5	

Atherton
Party	Candidate	Votes	%	±%
Labour	J. Clarke	1,583	76.4	+1.2
Independent Labour	D. Graeme	488	23.5	+14.6
Majority		1,095	52.9	−6.6
Turnout		2,071	22.2	−6.8
Labour hold		Swing	-6.7	

Bedford-Astley
Party	Candidate	Votes	%	±%
Labour	J. Jones	1,317	50.4	+1.8
Liberal Democrats	M. Bleakley	684	26.2	−25.2
Conservative	K. Mercer	611	23.4	+23.4
Majority		633	24.2	+21.4
Turnout		2,612	26.1	−9.4
Labour hold		Swing	+13.5	

Beech Hill
Party	Candidate	Votes	%	±%
Liberal Democrats	J. McGarty	1,875	63.2	+9.1
Labour	W. Blackedge	961	32.4	+0.1
Conservative	J. Carrington	132	4.4	−0.5
Majority		914	30.8	+8.9
Turnout		2,968	33.3	−8.6
Labour hold		Swing	+4.5	

Bryn
Party	Candidate	Votes	%	±%
Labour	M. Millington	1,512	75.0	−5.6
Conservative	B. Smith	503	25.0	+5.6
Majority		1,009	50.1	−11.2
Turnout		2,015	20.8	−11.4
Labour hold		Swing	-5.6	

Hindley
Party	Candidate	Votes	%	±%
Labour	A. Robinson	1,412	78.0	+40.5
Liberal Democrats	J. Milton	397	21.9	+21.9
Majority		1,015	56.1	+31.3
Turnout		1,809	18.6	−10.4
Labour hold		Swing	+9.3	

Hindley Green
Party	Candidate	Votes	%	±%
Labour	S. Murphy	1,158	57.4	−13.7
Conservative	E. Emmett	540	26.8	+26.8
Liberal Democrats	F. Graham	214	10.6	+10.6
Independent	J. Vickers	104	5.1	−23.6
Majority		618	30.6	−11.7
Turnout		2,016	17.5	−7.1
Labour hold		Swing	-20.2	

Hindsford
Party	Candidate	Votes	%	±%
Labour	W. Smith	1,647	67.2	N/A
Conservative	J. Wiseman	805	32.8	N/A
Majority		842	34.3	N/A
Turnout		2,452	22.5	N/A
Labour hold		Swing	N/A	

Hope Carr
Party	Candidate	Votes	%	±%
Labour	B. Jarvis	1,173	37.8	−3.0
Liberal Democrats	M. Holmes	964	31.0	−7.9
Conservative	J. Midgley	961	31.0	+11.0
Majority		209	6.7	+4.9
Turnout		3,098	30.7	−7.4
Labour hold		Swing	-2.4	

Ince
Party	Candidate	Votes	%	±%
Labour	J. Horrocks	1,208	80.7	−3.3
Conservative	J. Cartwright	172	11.5	+11.5
Liberal Democrats	A. Robinson	116	7.7	−8.2
Majority		1,036	69.2	+1.1
Turnout		1,496	18.9	−14.6
Labour hold		Swing	-7.4	

Langtree
Party	Candidate	Votes	%	±%
Liberal Democrats	D. Brown	1,626	45.9	+6.9
Labour	J. Ball	1,279	36.1	+0.8
Liberal	K. White	640	18.0	+2.1
Majority		347	9.8	+6.0
Turnout		3,545	31.2	−14.2
Liberal Democrats gain from Labour		Swing	+3.0	

Leigh Central
Party	Candidate	Votes	%	±%
Labour	J. Hession	1,249	63.6	+4.0
Liberal Democrats	J. Croft	715	36.4	−4.0
Majority		534	27.2	+7.9
Turnout		1,964	21.7	−10.3
Labour hold		Swing	+4.0	

Leigh East
Party	Candidate	Votes	%	±%
Labour	J. Riley	1,157	55.9	N/A
Liberal Democrats	B. Ratcliffe	911	44.0	N/A
Majority		246	11.9	N/A
Turnout		2,068	20.3	N/A
Labour hold		Swing	N/A	

Lightshaw
Party	Candidate	Votes	%	±%
Labour	N. Holt	1,978	59.5	−6.6
Conservative	S. Hide	1,348	40.5	+6.6
Majority		630	18.9	−13.3
Turnout		3,326	30.6	−12.5
Labour hold		Swing	-6.6	

Newtown
Party	Candidate	Votes	%	±%
Labour	M. Coghlin	1,085	72.2	−3.4
Conservative	J. Whitehead	215	14.3	+14.3
Liberal Democrats	L. Brooks	202	13.4	−10.9
Majority		870	57.9	+6.6
Turnout		1,502	16.5	−13.5
Labour hold		Swing	-8.8	

Norley
Party	Candidate	Votes	%	±%
Labour	R. Frodsham	1,233	77.8	N/A
Liberal Democrats	J. Shaw	208	13.1	N/A
Conservative	G. Peach	143	9.0	N/A
Majority		1,025	64.7	N/A
Turnout		1,584	20.7	N/A
Labour hold		Swing	N/A	

Orrell
Party	Candidate	Votes	%	±%
Labour	E. Swift	1,392	51.6	−0.7
Conservative	H. Melling	1,305	48.4	+12.2
Majority		87	3.2	−12.9
Turnout		2,697	26.4	−10.1
Labour hold		Swing	-6.4	

Swinley
Party	Candidate	Votes	%	±%
Conservative	E. Cartwright	1,581	52.8	+1.1
Labour	K. Anderson	1,158	38.7	−9.5
Liberal Democrats	P. Thistleton	252	8.4	+8.4
Majority		423	14.1	+10.7
Turnout		2,991	34.0	−9.0
Conservative hold		Swing	+5.3	

Tyldesley East
Party	Candidate	Votes	%	±%
Labour	A. Stephenson	1,389	52.2	N/A
Conservative	J. Mosley	971	36.5	N/A
Liberal Democrats	R. Rothwell	299	11.2	N/A
Majority		418	15.7	N/A
Turnout		2,659	22.9	N/A
Labour hold		Swing	N/A	

Whelley
Party	Candidate	Votes	%	±%
Labour	A. Coyle	1,188	66.1	−3.7
Conservative	K. Hart	292	16.2	+4.3
Liberal	S. Cairns	233	12.9	−0.1
Liberal Democrats	H. Wagner	85	4.7	−0.5
Majority		896	49.8	−6.9
Turnout		1,798	20.3	−14.0
Labour hold		Swing	-4.0	

Winstanley
Party	Candidate	Votes	%	±%
Labour	R. Winkworth	1,299	52.7	−0.5
Conservative	R. Clayton	625	25.4	+7.4
Liberal Democrats	A. McCarthy	538	21.8	−6.9
Majority		674	27.4	+2.9
Turnout		2,462	20.9	−10.3
Labour hold		Swing	-3.9	

Worsley Mesnes
Party	Candidate	Votes	%	±%
Labour	W. Brogan	1,122	65.2	−17.1
Liberal Democrats	W. Sly	315	18.3	+18.3
Conservative	J. Wright	284	16.5	−1.2
Majority		807	46.9	−17.6
Turnout		1,721	17.3	−10.0
Labour hold		Swing	-17.7	
