= 1990 Wigan Metropolitan Borough Council election =

1990 UK local government election

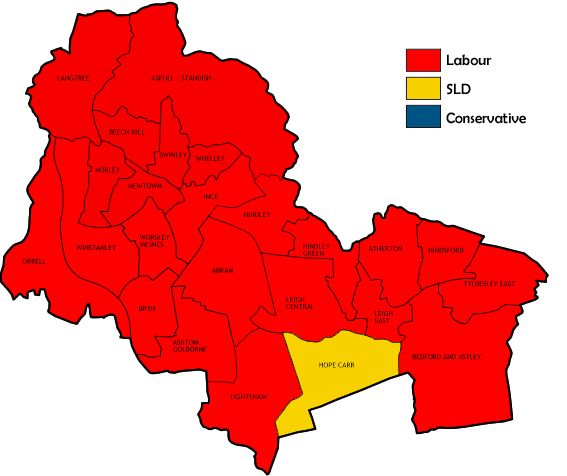
Map of the results of the 1990 Wigan council election.

Elections to the Wigan council were held on Thursday, 3 May 1990, with one third of the seats up for election with an additional vacancy in Bryn. Previous to the election there had also been a by-election in Abram, which the Labour Party successfully defended. Despite a wider array of parties - mainly a product from the fractious SLD merger - contesting the election, in several ways it beat 1986's lows in participation. A record of six seats went uncontested as one quarter of the council's wards held no elections, with the Conservatives contesting one half of the wards (an all-time low) and the SLD one quarter (the lowest since 1979). The Greens repeated their last year's total of four candidates, but with only two in the same wards as previous. Elsewhere, Independent John Vickers fought his first of many elections in Hindley Green and the respective Social Democrat and Liberal sides opposed to Alliance merging into the SLD fielded a sole candidate each - the latter of which having previously came within a straw of winning Langtree for the SLD.

The night seen numerous surprising gains, with Labour gaining another seat in the SLD bastion of Langtree, and for the first time, in the Conservative's bastion of Swinley, whilst the SLD managed its own breakthrough in the Labour territory of Hope Carr. With dwindling hopes of ever regaining Orrell, Swinley had become the Conservative's bulwark in recent years, and the Labour gain here raised the prospects of Conservative representation being removed altogether from the council. The loss of Hope Carr denied Labour a clean-sweep, but they managed an all-time high of winning all-but-one of the wards, and bettering their last year's record in voter share. Overall turnout in those wards contesting rose to a local elections high (with the 1979 election omitted for coinciding with the general election) of 39.4%.

== Election result ==
Wigan local election result 1990
Party	Seats	Gains	Losses	Net gain/loss	Seats %	Votes %	Votes	+/−
Labour	24	2	1	+1	96.0	69.2	48,633	+0.6%
SLD	1	1	1	0	4.0	11.2	7,852	-1.4%
Conservative	0	0	1	-1	0.0	13.2	9,288	-3.9%
Green	0	0	0	0	0.0	3.3	2,320	+1.8%
Liberal	0	0	0	0	0.0	1.6	1,153	+1.6%
Independent	0	0	0	0	0.0	0.9	663	+0.9%
SDP	0	0	0	0	0.0	0.5	391	+0.5%

This result had the following consequences for the total number of seats on the Council after the elections:

Party	Previous council	New council
Labour	63	64
Social and Liberal Democrats	5	5
Conservatives	3	2
Independent Labour	1	1
Green	0	0
Liberal	0	0
Independent	0	0
Social Democrat	0	0
Total	72	72
Working majority	54	56

== Ward results ==
Abram
Party	Candidate	Votes	%	±%
Labour	J. Tiernan	Unopposed	N/A	N/A
Labour hold		Swing	N/A	

Ashton-Golborne
Party	Candidate	Votes	%	±%
Labour	S. Lea	2,844	79.0	+0.8
Conservative	I. Cunliffe	756	21.0	−0.8
Majority		2,088	58.0	+1.7
Turnout		3,600	36.7	+8.7
Labour hold		Swing	+0.8	

Aspull-Standish
Party	Candidate	Votes	%	±%
Labour	J. Hilton	2,681	53.3	+5.4
SLD	D. Brown	1,518	30.2	−5.6
Conservative	J. Carrington	831	16.5	+0.2
Majority		1,163	23.1	+11.0
Turnout		5,030	46.1	+2.6
Labour hold		Swing	+5.5	

Atherton
Party	Candidate	Votes	%	±%
Labour	L. Sumner	2,594	80.3	−1.5
Green	S. Bickerton	636	19.7	+19.7
Majority		1,958	60.6	−3.0
Turnout		3,230	35.3	−0.6
Labour hold		Swing	-10.6	

Bedford-Astley
Party	Candidate	Votes	%	±%
Labour	F. Walker	2,380	70.4	+7.9
Green	I. Graham	998	29.5	+19.6
Majority		1,382	40.9	+5.9
Turnout		3,378	33.9	+2.4
Labour hold		Swing	-5.8	

Beech Hill
Party	Candidate	Votes	%	±%
Labour	T. Bishop	2,095	51.1	+6.3
SLD	V. Milton	2,001	48.8	+1.1
Majority		94	2.3	−0.6
Turnout		4,096	46.5	+5.6
Labour hold		Swing	+2.6	

Bryn
Party	Candidate	Votes	%	±%
Labour	A. Melling	2,783	80.7	−1.2
Labour	M. Millington	2,411		
Conservative	B. Smith	663	19.2	+1.2
Majority		2,120	61.5	−2.4
Turnout		3,446	34.8	+3.6
Labour hold		Swing		
Labour hold		Swing	-1.2	

Hindley
Party	Candidate	Votes	%	±%
Labour	G. Green	2,656	74.7	−12.5
SLD	C. Barton	558	15.7	+15.7
Green	A. Wood	342	9.6	−3.2
Majority		2,098	59.0	−15.3
Turnout		3,556	36.9	+8.4
Labour hold		Swing	-14.1	

Hindley Green
Party	Candidate	Votes	%	±%
Labour	W. Simmons	2,741	72.2	−8.3
Independent	J. Vickers	663	17.5	+17.5
SDP	V. Norris	391	10.3	+10.3
Majority		2,078	54.7	−6.4
Turnout		3,795	32.6	+8.5
Labour hold		Swing	-12.9	

Hindsford
Party	Candidate	Votes	%	±%
Labour	A. Wright	Unopposed	N/A	N/A
Labour hold		Swing	N/A	

Hope Carr
Party	Candidate	Votes	%	±%
SLD	E. Herdman	1,956	51.1	+51.1
Labour	P. Culshaw	1,870	48.9	−14.1
Majority		86	2.2	−23.7
Turnout		3,826	37.8	+4.6
SLD gain from Labour		Swing	+32.6	

Ince
Party	Candidate	Votes	%	±%
Labour	T. Davies	Unopposed	N/A	N/A
Labour hold		Swing	N/A	

Langtree
Party	Candidate	Votes	%	±%
Labour	J. O'Neill	2,606	49.4	+7.6
Liberal	K. White	1,153	21.8	+21.8
SLD	A. Robinson	899	17.0	−24.8
Conservative	J. Wolstenholme	618	11.7	−4.6
Majority		1,453	27.5	+27.5
Turnout		5,276	47.0	+4.9
Labour gain from SLD		Swing	-7.1	

Leigh Central
Party	Candidate	Votes	%	±%
Labour	P. Smith	Unopposed	N/A	N/A
Labour hold		Swing	N/A	

Leigh East
Party	Candidate	Votes	%	±%
Labour	T. Harper	Unopposed	N/A	N/A
Labour hold		Swing	N/A	

Lightshaw
Party	Candidate	Votes	%	±%
Labour	T. Sherratt	3,538	75.9	+2.6
Conservative	S. Hide	1,122	24.1	+5.6
Majority		2,416	51.8	−3.0
Turnout		4,660	43.8	+7.0
Labour hold		Swing	-1.5	

Newtown
Party	Candidate	Votes	%	±%
Labour	K. Pye	3,254	89.6	+3.1
Conservative	J. Whitehead	378	10.4	−3.1
Majority		2,876	79.2	+6.2
Turnout		3,632	39.2	+9.3
Labour hold		Swing	+3.1	

Norley
Party	Candidate	Votes	%	±%
Labour	N. Turner	3,102	93.2	+4.6
Conservative	G. Peach	227	6.8	+0.5
Majority		2,875	86.3	+4.2
Turnout		3,329	43.0	+9.5
Labour hold		Swing	+2.0	

Orrell
Party	Candidate	Votes	%	±%
Labour	G. Seaward	2,719	68.0	+8.2
Conservative	C. Michaels	1,276	31.9	−8.2
Majority		1,443	36.1	+16.3
Turnout		3,995	39.0	+2.0
Labour hold		Swing	+8.2	

Swinley
Party	Candidate	Votes	%	±%
Labour	S. Turner	2,282	52.1	+13.2
Conservative	C. Giles	2,095	47.8	−0.4
Majority		187	4.3	−5.1
Turnout		4,377	49.1	+2.4
Labour gain from Conservative		Swing	+6.8	

Tyldesley East
Party	Candidate	Votes	%	±%
Labour	B. Wilson	Unopposed	N/A	N/A
Labour hold		Swing	N/A	

Whelley
Party	Candidate	Votes	%	±%
Labour	W. Pendleton	2,686	78.9	−2.5
Conservative	F. Sidebotham	373	10.9	−0.6
Green	J. Ford	344	10.1	+10.1
Majority		2,313	68.0	−1.9
Turnout		3,403	38.1	+7.7
Labour hold		Swing	-0.9	

Winstanley
Party	Candidate	Votes	%	±%
Labour	W. Evans	2,799	63.3	+9.2
SLD	P. Mayston	920	20.8	−25.1
Conservative	J. Horswell	701	15.8	+15.8
Majority		1,879	42.5	+34.3
Turnout		4,420	37.5	+5.4
Labour hold		Swing	+17.1	

Worsley Mesnes
Party	Candidate	Votes	%	±%
Labour	H. Milligan	3,003	92.4	+6.5
Conservative	J. Grimshaw	248	7.6	−6.5
Majority		2,755	84.7	+13.1
Turnout		3,251	33.1	+7.8
Labour hold		Swing	+6.5	
