= 1973 Wigan Metropolitan Borough Council election =

1973 UK local government election

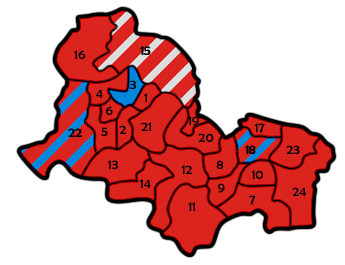
Map of the results for the 1973 Wigan council election. Labour in red, Conservatives in blue and Independent in grey.

The 1973 Wigan Council elections for the First Wigan Metropolitan Borough Council were held on 10 May 1973, with the entirety of the 72 seat council - three seats for each of the 24 wards - up for vote. It was the first council election as the newly formed metropolitan borough under a new constitution. The Local Government Act 1972 stipulated that the elected members were to shadow and eventually take over from the predecessor corporation on 1 April 1974. The order in which the councillors were elected dictated their term serving, with third-place candidates serving two years and up for re-election in 1975, second-placed three years expiring in 1976 and 1st-placed five years until 1978.

Labour won an overwhelming majority of sixty six seats to the Conservative's five and one Independent. Nine seats - for wards 13, 17 and 21 collectively - went unopposed and overall turnout was 34.5%.

== Election result ==
Wigan Council Election Result 1973
Party	Seats	Gains	Losses	Net gain/loss	Seats %	Votes %	Votes	+/−
Labour	66	0	0	0	91.7	60.5	40,000	N/A
Conservative	5	0	0	0	6.9	28.4	18,793	N/A
Independent	1	0	0	0	1.4	8.1	5,363	N/A
Independent Labour	0	0	0	0	0.0	1.4	942	N/A
Own Occ.	0	0	0	0	0.0	1.3	862	N/A
Communist	0	0	0	0	0.0	0.2	141	N/A

This result had the following consequences for the total number of seats on the Council after the elections:

Party	New council
Labour	66
Conservatives	5
Independent	1
Total	72
Working majority	60

== Ward results ==
Ward 1 (Lindsay-Scholes-Whelley)
Party	Candidate	Votes	%	±%
Labour	F. Connolly	2,570	73.6	N/A
Labour	A. Coyle	2,568		
Labour	M. Pratt	2,381		
Conservative	C. Giles	921	26.4	N/A
Conservative	R. Stockley	775		
Conservative	J. Lawson	732		
Majority		1,460	47.2	N/A
Turnout		3,491	38.6	N/A
Labour win (new seat)				
Labour win (new seat)				
Labour win (new seat)				

Ward 2 (Poolstock-Worsley Mesnes)
Party	Candidate	Votes	%	±%
Labour	W. Brogan	2,149	81.6	N/A
Labour	H. Milligan	1,898		
Labour	S. Townley	1,873		
Conservative	P. Harrison	485	18.4	N/A
Majority		1,664	63.2	N/A
Turnout		2,634	27.5	N/A
Labour win (new seat)				
Labour win (new seat)				
Labour win (new seat)				

Ward 3 (Gidlow-Swinley-Whitley)
Party	Candidate	Votes	%	±%
Conservative	H. Dowling	2,765	59.7	N/A
Conservative	G. Lewthwaite	2,687		
Conservative	W. Somers	2,686		
Labour	E. Maloney	1,867	40.3	N/A
Labour	R. Baker	1,840		
Labour	H. Barker	1,820		
Majority		898	19.4	N/A
Turnout		4,632	39.4	N/A
Conservative win (new seat)				
Conservative win (new seat)				
Conservative win (new seat)				

Ward 4 (Beech Hill and Marsh Green)
Party	Candidate	Votes	%	±%
Labour	J. Presst	2,393	80.5	N/A
Labour	E. Naylor	2,380		
Labour	J. Eckersley	2,373		
Conservative	W. France	580	19.5	N/A
Majority		1,813	61.0	N/A
Turnout		2,973	31.5	N/A
Labour win (new seat)				
Labour win (new seat)				
Labour win (new seat)				

Ward 5 (Highfield and Lamberhead)
Party	Candidate	Votes	%	±%
Labour	G. Barlow	1,982	68.1	N/A
Labour	E. Maddocks	1,961		
Labour	J. Smith	1,848		
Conservative	J. Gaskell	930	31.9	N/A
Conservative	L. Low	817		
Conservative	C. Boyle	706		
Majority		1,052	36.1	N/A
Turnout		2,912	30.6	N/A
Labour win (new seat)				
Labour win (new seat)				
Labour win (new seat)				

Ward 6 (Newtown and Rose Hill)
Party	Candidate	Votes	%	±%
Labour	A. Peet	1,806	81.6	N/A
Labour	J. Bridge	1,710		
Labour	M. Mulligan	1,662		
Conservative	J. Whittle	407	18.4	N/A
Majority		1,399	63.2	N/A
Turnout		2,213	25.3	N/A
Labour win (new seat)				
Labour win (new seat)				
Labour win (new seat)				

Ward 7 (Hope Carr)
Party	Candidate	Votes	%	±%
Labour	A. Roberts	1,444	56.6	N/A
Labour	T. Hourigan	1,423		
Labour	J. Jones	1,322		
Conservative	J. Sinai	1,108	43.4	N/A
Conservative	R. Goodwin	1,085		
Conservative	D. Angell	1,011		
Majority		336	13.2	N/A
Turnout		2,552	36.6	N/A
Labour win (new seat)				
Labour win (new seat)				
Labour win (new seat)				

Ward 8 (St Pauls and St Peters)
Party	Candidate	Votes	%	±%
Labour	G. Macdonald	1,387	74.5	N/A
Labour	P. Hull	1,368		
Labour	G. Bridge	1,259		
Conservative	M. Price	333	17.9	N/A
Conservative	R. Boardman	324		
Conservative	D. Blyth	267		
Communist	J. Blackburn	141	7.6	N/A
Majority		1,054	56.6	N/A
Turnout		1,861	21.8	N/A
Labour win (new seat)				
Labour win (new seat)				
Labour win (new seat)				

Ward 9 (Etherstone and St Marys)
Party	Candidate	Votes	%	±%
Labour	E. Moore	1,538	60.7	N/A
Labour	J. Riley	1,522		
Labour	W. Derbyshire	1,455		
Conservative	M. Howcroft	994	39.3	N/A
Conservative	S. Simm	972		
Conservative	S. Johnson	905		
Majority		544	21.5	N/A
Turnout		2,532	27.0	N/A
Labour win (new seat)				
Labour win (new seat)				
Labour win (new seat)				

Ward 10 (Lilford-St Josephs-St Thomas)
Party	Candidate	Votes	%	±%
Labour	H. Smith	1,727	53.2	N/A
Labour	J. Murray	1,714		
Labour	J. Prytharch	1,594		
Conservative	M. Wood	1,518	46.8	N/A
Conservative	H. Yates	1,477		
Conservative	K. Price	1,459		
Majority		209	6.4	N/A
Turnout		3,245	35.8	N/A
Labour win (new seat)				
Labour win (new seat)				
Labour win (new seat)				

Ward 11 (Golborne St Thomas and Lowton)
Party	Candidate	Votes	%	±%
Labour	N. Holt	2,918	73.7	N/A
Labour	T. Morgan	2,852		
Labour	E. Roberts	2,826		
Conservative	T. Thompson	1,040	26.3	N/A
Conservative	D. Fryer	979		
Conservative	W. Kearns	968		
Majority		1,878	47.4	N/A
Turnout		3,958	39.4	N/A
Labour win (new seat)				
Labour win (new seat)				
Labour win (new seat)				

Ward 12 (Golborne Heath Park and Ashton)
Party	Candidate	Votes	%	±%
Labour	J. Hilton	2,272	74.2	N/A
Labour	E. Houghton	2,183		
Labour	A. Miller	2,104		
Independent	B. Doubledam	788	25.8	N/A
Majority		1,484	48.5	N/A
Turnout		3,060	34.8	N/A
Labour win (new seat)				
Labour win (new seat)				
Labour win (new seat)				

Ward 13 (Ashton-in-Makerfield North and West)
Party	Candidate	Votes	%	±%
Labour	G. Lockett	Unopposed	N/A	N/A
Labour	R. Lyons	Unopposed	N/A	N/A
Labour	A. Heckles	Unopposed	N/A	N/A
Labour win (new seat)				
Labour win (new seat)				
Labour win (new seat)				

Ward 14 (Ashton-in-Makerfield Central and East)
Party	Candidate	Votes	%	±%
Labour	S. Lea	1,561	70.3	N/A
Labour	T. Jones	1,492		
Labour	G. Fairhurst	1,475		
Conservative	C. Kinrade	658	29.7	N/A
Majority		903	40.7	N/A
Turnout		2,219	27.8	N/A
Labour win (new seat)				
Labour win (new seat)				
Labour win (new seat)				

Ward 15 (Standish with Langtree and Shevington)
Party	Candidate	Votes	%	±%
Labour	G. Meadows	1,780	33.3	N/A
Labour	J. Healey	1,674		
Independent	G. Dewhurst	1,553	29.1	N/A
Labour	E. Garner	1,503		
Conservative	B. Maccarthy	1,067	20.0	N/A
Conservative	F. Wareing	1,038		
Independent Labour	I. Cropper	942	17.6	N/A
Majority		227	4.2	N/A
Turnout		5,342	50.9	N/A
Labour win (new seat)				
Labour win (new seat)				
Independent win (new seat)				

Ward 16 (Aspull)
Party	Candidate	Votes	%	±%
Labour	A. Singer	2,526	64.6	N/A
Labour	W. Mason	2,452		
Labour	H. Lowe	2,397		
Conservative	J. Blackledge	1,387	35.4	N/A
Conservative	D. Pardey	1,381		
Conservative	A. Turner	1,189		
Majority		1,139	29.1	N/A
Turnout		3,913	39.1	N/A
Labour win (new seat)				
Labour win (new seat)				
Labour win (new seat)				

Ward 17 (Atherton North East)
Party	Candidate	Votes	%	±%
Labour	L. Sumner	Unopposed	N/A	N/A
Labour	J. Clarke	Unopposed	N/A	N/A
Labour	D. Skitt	Unopposed	N/A	N/A
Labour win (new seat)				
Labour win (new seat)				
Labour win (new seat)				

Ward 18 (Atherton South West)
Party	Candidate	Votes	%	±%
Labour	J. Sumner	1,230	46.8	N/A
Conservative	M. Williams	1,000	38.0	N/A
Labour	G. Horrabin	920		
Conservative	H. Sharland	919		
Labour	L. Seddon	880		
Conservative	E. Sweeney	827		
Independent	V. France	400	15.2	N/A
Majority		230	8.7	N/A
Turnout		2,630	39.8	N/A
Labour win (new seat)				
Conservative win (new seat)				
Labour win (new seat)				

Ward 19 (Hindley Central and North)
Party	Candidate	Votes	%	±%
Labour	C. Priestley	2,022	76.0	N/A
Labour	T. Isherwood	2,011		
Labour	A. Robinson	1,895		
Conservative	K. Dempsey	637	24.0	N/A
Majority		1,385	52.1	N/A
Turnout		2,659	33.5	N/A
Labour win (new seat)				
Labour win (new seat)				
Labour win (new seat)				

Ward 20 (Hindley South East and West)
Party	Candidate	Votes	%	±%
Labour	G. Harrison	1,834	63.5	N/A
Labour	B. McAllister	1,749		
Labour	S. Hardy	1,712		
Conservative	J. Culshaw	1,053	36.5	N/A
Majority		781	27.1	N/A
Turnout		2,887	29.2	N/A
Labour win (new seat)				
Labour win (new seat)				
Labour win (new seat)				

Ward 21 (Ince-in-Makerfield)
Party	Candidate	Votes	%	±%
Labour	R. Taylor	Unopposed	N/A	N/A
Labour	A. Rowlandson	Unopposed	N/A	N/A
Labour	A. Banks	Unopposed	N/A	N/A
Labour win (new seat)				
Labour win (new seat)				
Labour win (new seat)				

Ward 22 (Orrell and Billinge)
Party	Candidate	Votes	%	±%
Labour	J. Whittle	2,155	38.1	N/A
Labour	S. Waring	1,931		
Conservative	J. Simpkin	1,910	33.8	N/A
Labour	L. Grime	1,818		
Conservative	F. Fairbairn	1,705		
Independent	A. Atherton	1,587	28.1	N/A
Majority		245	4.3	N/A
Turnout		5,652	44.6	N/A
Labour win (new seat)				
Labour win (new seat)				
Conservative win (new seat)				

Ward 23 (Tyldesley - Shakerley)
Party	Candidate	Votes	%	±%
Labour	S. Little	1,616	70.8	N/A
Labour	M. Devlin	1,559		
Labour	A. Wright	1,509		
Independent	J. Barnes	666	29.2	N/A
Majority		950	41.6	N/A
Turnout		2,282	28.6	N/A
Labour win (new seat)				
Labour win (new seat)				
Labour win (new seat)				

Ward 24 (Tyldesley - Astley Green and Blackmoor)
Party	Candidate	Votes	%	±%
Labour	R. Rawson	1,223	49.8	N/A
Labour	F. Walker	1,219		
Labour	F. Hampson	1,151		
Own Occ.	F. Valentine	862	35.1	N/A
Own Occ.	H. Pawsey	853		
Own Occ.	E. Myers	742		
Independent	J. Parry	369	15.0	N/A
Majority		361	14.7	N/A
Turnout		2,454	34.3	N/A
Labour win (new seat)				
Labour win (new seat)				
Labour win (new seat)				
