= 2000 Wigan Metropolitan Borough Council election =

2000 UK local government election

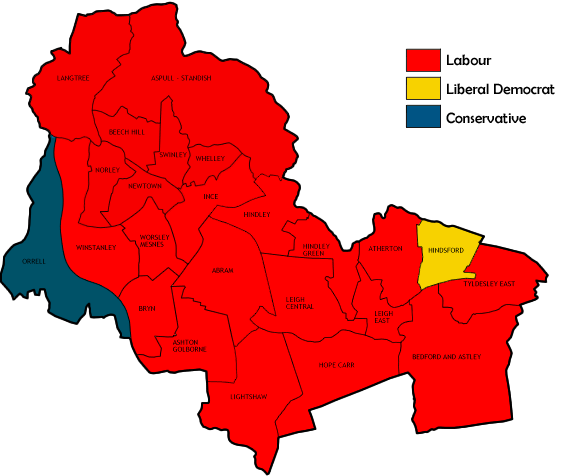
Map of the results of the 2000 Wigan council election.

Elections to Wigan Borough Council were held on 4 May 2000. One-third of the council was up for election, as well as an extra vacancy in Norley - both of which were uncontested. Since the election, there had been a by-election in which the Liberal Democrats gained the seat being fought in Hindsford from Labour.

The previous year had seen a peak in candidates contesting, but with the absence of the Greens, who had fielded a full slate last time around, candidates returned to a normal level. Some of those who'd stood for the Greens decided to run on an independent list, covering a quarter of the wards. There were a further handful of Independent candidates elsewhere, including the return of John Vickers in Hindley Green after an eight-year absence, and a second attempt of Jack Sumner in Leigh East, to produce the highest number of Independents contesting since 1973. The Conservatives fielded their highest amount, at 21, since 1982, and the Lib Dems - whilst still much reduced from their Alliance years - produced a stronger showing than recent years of ten candidates. Labour, as usual, contested every seat.

Turnout followed recent trends, at a slightly improved 19.5%, although the three wards that trailed postal voting seen marked increases. Similarities ended there, as the Conservatives seen a dramatic recovery in their fortunes, with their voter share rising to the highest since 1980, and their vote near double recent years figures. Labour, in turn, suffered double-digit swings against them in most wards, with a sharp fall in their vote share to pre-peak levels and their lowest vote figure since the council's inception, narrowly surpassing the previous figure set in 1975. The Lib Dems seen another year of modest improvement in their vote, and the two returning Independents, as well as a third in Hindley garnered large swings towards them.

In all, there were two gains on the night, with Labour gaining in Beech Hill to return it to full Labour representation after a decade of Lib Dem inroads, and a loss to the Conservatives who won back representation on the council by way of their first win in Orrell since 1982. The Lib Dems narrowly held onto their newly won seat in Hindsford, with a 56-vote majority.

== Election results ==
Wigan local election result 2000
Party	Seats	Gains	Losses	Net gain/loss	Seats %	Votes %	Votes	+/−
Labour	23	1	1	0	92.0	56.9	25,190	-10.8
Conservative	1	1	0	+1	4.0	25.1	11,108	+12.4
Liberal Democrats	1	0	1	-1	4.0	11.9	5,281	+3.0
Independent	0	0	0	0	0.0	4.4	1,956	+4.1
Independent Green	0	0	0	0	0.0	1.6	712	+1.6

This result had the following consequences for the total number of seats on the Council after the elections:

Party	Previous council	New council
Labour	69	69
Liberal Democrat	3	2
Conservative	0	1
Independent	0	0
EIE	0	0
Total	72	72
Working majority	66	66

== Ward results ==
Abram
Party	Candidate	Votes	%	±%
Labour	A. Bennett	769	68.8	−10.2
Conservative	M. Parr	348	31.1	+17.4
Majority		421	37.7	−27.6
Turnout		1,117	12.4	+0.0
Labour hold		Swing	-13.8	

Ashton-Golborne
Party	Candidate	Votes	%	±%
Labour	N. Ash	1,065	64.4	−5.8
Conservative	R. Rees	588	35.6	+17.9
Majority		477	28.8	−23.8
Turnout		1,653	15.7	−1.3
Labour hold		Swing	-11.8	

Aspull-Standish
Party	Candidate	Votes	%	±%
Labour	C. Ready	1,256	50.2	−8.0
Conservative	T. Peet	671	26.8	+12.2
Liberal Democrats	J. Beswick	493	19.7	−1.4
Independent Green	D. Schanzl	82	3.3	+3.3
Majority		585	23.4	−13.7
Turnout		2,502	21.4	+1.1
Labour hold		Swing	-10.1	

Atherton
Party	Candidate	Votes	%	±%
Labour	J. Clarke	1,108	63.4	−11.3
Liberal Democrats	C. Thomson	363	20.8	+20.8
Conservative	R. Oxley	276	15.8	−0.5
Majority		745	42.6	−15.7
Turnout		1,747	20.3	+1.8
Labour hold		Swing	-16.0	

Bedford-Astley
Party	Candidate	Votes	%	±%
Labour	C. Rigby	1,230	54.4	−16.8
Conservative	N. Dugmore	656	29.0	+11.4
Liberal Democrats	F. Graham	281	12.4	+12.4
Independent Green	L. Maile	94	4.1	+4.1
Majority		574	25.4	−28.2
Turnout		2,261	26.8	+8.4
Labour hold		Swing	-14.1	

Beech Hill
Party	Candidate	Votes	%	±%
Labour	T. Halliwell	1,286	55.1	−1.8
Liberal Democrats	T. Beswick	918	39.3	−2.2
Conservative	J. Pietre	130	5.6	+5.6
Majority		368	15.8	+0.4
Turnout		2,334	26.1	−1.0
Labour gain from Liberal Democrats		Swing	+0.2	

Bryn
Party	Candidate	Votes	%	±%
Labour	M. Millington	1,178	69.4	−8.3
Conservative	M. Green	518	30.5	+15.2
Majority		660	38.9	−23.6
Turnout		1,696	17.2	−0.9
Labour hold		Swing	-11.7	

Hindley
Party	Candidate	Votes	%	±%
Labour	A. Robinson	877	49.5	−17.1
Independent	B. Worthington	683	38.6	+38.6
Conservative	S. Isherwood	210	11.9	+11.9
Majority		194	11.0	−29.5
Turnout		1,770	17.5	+0.7
Labour hold		Swing	-27.8	

Hindley Green
Party	Candidate	Votes	%	±%
Labour	S. Murphy	843	48.4	−28.8
Independent	J. Vickers	566	32.5	+32.5
Conservative	A. Davies	331	19.0	+4.9
Majority		277	15.9	−47.2
Turnout		1,740	16.0	+1.9
Labour hold		Swing	-30.6	

Hindsford
Party	Candidate	Votes	%	±%
Liberal Democrats	G. Lingings	1,163	46.5	−6.9
Labour	M. Aldred	1,107	44.2	+4.5
Conservative	D. Angell	124	4.9	+0.3
Independent	T. Norris	108	4.3	+4.3
Majority		56	2.2	−11.5
Turnout		2,502	23.7	+0.9
Liberal Democrats hold		Swing	-5.7	

Hope Carr
Party	Candidate	Votes	%	±%
Labour	L. Liptrot	946	39.1	−10.8
Conservative	A. Oxley	672	27.8	+6.8
Liberal Democrats	P. Hough	511	21.1	+21.1
Independent Green	C. Maile	289	11.9	+11.9
Majority		274	11.3	−9.4
Turnout		2,418	23.7	−3.6
Labour hold		Swing	-8.8	

Ince
Party	Candidate	Votes	%	±%
Labour	K. Baldwin	864	75.1	−12.3
Conservative	A. Eccles	165	14.3	+6.7
Independent Green	N. Maile	121	10.5	+10.5
Majority		699	60.8	−19.7
Turnout		1,150	14.9	−0.2
Labour hold		Swing	-9.5	

Langtree
Party	Candidate	Votes	%	±%
Labour	D. Brown	1,129	47.9	−17.6
Conservative	J. Peet	789	33.5	+33.5
Liberal Democrats	H. Wagner	438	18.6	−9.3
Majority		340	14.4	−23.2
Turnout		2,356	20.2	+2.3
Labour hold		Swing	-25.5	

Leigh Central
Party	Candidate	Votes	%	±%
Labour	K. Thomas	877	70.2	−8.5
Conservative	N. Isherwood	372	29.8	+19.7
Majority		505	40.4	−27.1
Turnout		1,249	14.7	−2.6
Labour hold		Swing	-14.1	

Leigh East
Party	Candidate	Votes	%	±%
Labour	B. Jarvis	877	54.7	−14.0
Independent	J. Sumner	416	26.0	+16.9
Conservative	D. Davies	309	19.3	+3.6
Majority		361	28.8	−24.2
Turnout		1,602	15.0	−0.2
Labour hold		Swing	-15.4	

Lightshaw
Party	Candidate	Votes	%	±%
Labour	D. Kelly	1,552	60.2	−7.0
Conservative	J. Grundy	1,024	39.8	+16.3
Majority		528	20.5	−23.3
Turnout		2,576	21.5	+0.2
Labour hold		Swing	-11.6	

Newtown
Party	Candidate	Votes	%	±%
Labour	M. Coghlin	758	68.9	−14.2
Liberal Democrats	M. McGowan	250	22.7	+11.0
Independent Green	N. Bird	92	8.4	+8.4
Majority		508	46.2	−25.2
Turnout		1,100	13.0	−1.4
Labour hold		Swing	-12.6	

Norley
Party	Candidate	Votes	%	±%
Labour	B. Bourne	Unopposed	N/A	N/A
Labour	J. Prescott	Unopposed	N/A	N/A
Labour hold		Swing	N/A	
Labour hold		Swing	N/A	

Orrell
Party	Candidate	Votes	%	±%
Conservative	M. Winstanley	1,003	51.6	+16.0
Labour	E. Swift	940	48.4	−10.2
Majority		63	3.2	−19.7
Turnout		1,943	21.3	+1.5
Conservative gain from Labour		Swing	+13.1	

Swinley
Party	Candidate	Votes	%	±%
Labour	G. Walsh	1,020	45.1	−7.5
Conservative	J. Davies	934	41.3	+10.9
Liberal Democrats	A. Robinson	272	12.0	−1.8
Independent Green	D. Saunders	34	1.5	+1.5
Majority		86	3.8	−18.4
Turnout		2,260	26.5	+1.3
Labour hold		Swing	-9.2	

Tyldesley East
Party	Candidate	Votes	%	±%
Labour	A. Stephenson	1,023	56.9	−17.9
Liberal Democrats	C. Jones	592	32.9	+32.9
Independent	A. Vickers	183	10.2	+10.2
Majority		431	24.0	−25.7
Turnout		1,798	15.3	−0.8
Labour hold		Swing	-25.4	

Whelley
Party	Candidate	Votes	%	±%
Labour	A. Coyle	1,565	75.1	−11.0
Conservative	E. Mather	518	24.9	+24.9
Majority		1,047	50.2	−21.9
Turnout		2,083	25.8	+6.5
Labour hold		Swing	-17.9	

Winstanley
Party	Candidate	Votes	%	±%
Labour	R. Winkworth	2,059	65.3	−4.8
Conservative	J. Cartwright	1,094	34.7	+14.0
Majority		965	30.6	−18.8
Turnout		3,153	25.4	+9.0
Labour hold		Swing	-9.4	

Worsley Mesnes
Party	Candidate	Votes	%	±%
Labour	W. Brogan	861	69.6	−11.8
Conservative	T. Sutton	376	30.4	+18.7
Majority		485	39.2	−30.6
Turnout		1,237	13.1	−0.8
Labour hold		Swing	-15.2	

== By-elections between 2000 and 2002 ==
Atherton By-Election 5 April 2001
Party	Candidate	Votes	%	±%
Liberal Democrats	Bob Splaine	830	49.1	+28.3
Labour	Mark Aldred	796	47.0	−16.4
Conservative	Rosina Oxley	66	3.9	−11.9
Majority		34	2.1	−40.5
Turnout		1,692	19.9	−0.4
Liberal Democrats gain from Labour		Swing	+22.3	

Hope Carr By-Election 7 June 2001
Party	Candidate	Votes	%	±%
Labour	John O'Brien	2,569	46.4	+7.3
Liberal Democrats	Peter Hough	1,887	34.1	+13.0
Conservative	James Grundy	1,002	18.1	−9.7
Socialist Alliance	Keith Fry	82	1.5	+1.5
Majority		682	12.3	+1.0
Turnout		5,540	53.4	+29.7
Labour hold		Swing	-2.8	

Hindsford By-Election 25 October 2001
Party	Candidate	Votes	%	±%
Labour	Mark Aldred	1,059	50.9	+6.7
Liberal Democrats	Neil Hogg	945	45.5	−1.0
Conservative	Nigel Dugmore	75	3.6	−1.3
Majority		114	5.4	+3.2
Turnout		2,079	19.5	+4.2
Labour gain from Liberal Democrats		Swing	+3.8	
