= 1988 Wigan Metropolitan Borough Council election =

1988 UK local government election

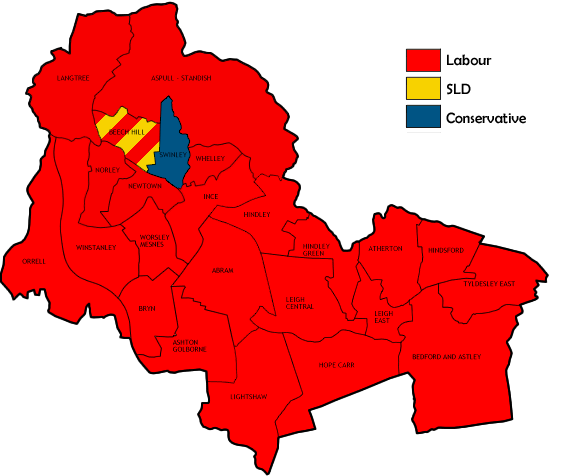
Map of the results of the 1988 Wigan council election.

Elections to the Wigan council were held on Thursday, 5 May 1988, with one third of the seats up for election as well as an extra vacancy in Beech Hill. Following the previous election, two by-elections had taken place, with the Labour Party successfully defending their seats in Ince and Newtown. This year's election seen an improvement in participation, with all wards fought and five parties contesting in some form, by way of the Greens fielding their first ever slate of four candidates and the return of long-time Communist contender H. Kedward in Leigh Central. Despite this, the number of candidates contesting actually fell by five from the previous year's 64, as the turbulent new merger of the old SDP-Liberal Alliance, Social and Liberal Democrats, fielded just half the number of candidates they'd managed in 1987 and, at 11, the lowest since 1980.

This was reflected by the results on the night as the SLD suffered a large drop in their vote, returning them to third place behind the Conservatives and reducing their vote total to four figure for the first time since the aforementioned 1980 election. The overwhelming beneficiary of SLD losses were Labour, helping their vote share hit a record high of 68.6% and the highest vote figure gained - beyond the anomaly of 1979 - since the council's creation. Seat wise, Labour made two gains of the night, one in the SLD-Labour marginal of Aspull-Standish and the other in the more significant SLD bastion of Langtree, which until this point had only elected SLD candidates, where Labour managed to equal SLD votes and draw the larger straw. Labour achieved a record capture of seats, with opposition wins curtailed to an exceptional SLD performance - and gain - of one of the seats fought in Beech Hill and a Conservative hold in their bastion of Swinley. Overall turnout fell from 37.1% to 32.4%.

== Election result ==
Wigan local election result 1988
Party	Seats	Gains	Losses	Net gain/loss	Seats %	Votes %	Votes	+/−
Labour	23	2	1	+1	92.0	68.6	52,325	+9.3
Conservative	1	0	0	0	4.0	17.1	13,083	+1.8
SLD	1	1	2	-1	4.0	12.6	9,640	-10.5
Green	0	0	0	0	0.0	1.5	1,155	+1.5
Communist	0	0	0	0	0.0	0.1	62	+0.1

This result had the following consequences for the total number of seats on the Council after the elections:

Party	Previous council	New council
Labour	62	63
Social and Liberal Democrats	6	5
Conservatives	3	3
Independent Labour	1	1
Green	0	0
Communist	0	0
Total	72	72
Working majority	52	54

== Ward results ==
Abram
Party	Candidate	Votes	%	±%
Labour	A. Bennett	2,094	86.8	+6.8
Green	P. Tarleton	319	13.2	+13.2
Majority		1,775	73.5	+4.8
Turnout		2,413	25.2	−9.6
Labour hold		Swing	-3.2	

Ashton-Golborne
Party	Candidate	Votes	%	±%
Labour	T. Jones	2,140	78.1	+12.8
Conservative	S. Edwards	598	21.8	+0.6
Majority		1,542	56.3	+12.2
Turnout		2,738	27.9	−6.6
Labour hold		Swing	+6.1	

Aspull-Standish
Party	Candidate	Votes	%	±%
Labour	A. Durkin	2,201	47.9	+6.6
SLD	P. Wilson	1,645	35.8	−6.2
Conservative	K. Hart	751	16.3	−0.4
Majority		556	12.1	+11.4
Turnout		4,597	43.5	−5.9
Labour gain from SLD		Swing	+6.4	

Atherton
Party	Candidate	Votes	%	±%
Labour	J. Clark	2,755	81.8	+5.6
Conservative	M. Hatton	613	18.2	−5.6
Majority		2,142	63.6	+11.3
Turnout		3,368	35.9	+0.9
Labour hold		Swing	+5.6	

Bedford-Astley
Party	Candidate	Votes	%	±%
Labour	J. Jones	1,954	62.5	+4.0
Conservative	D. Angell	861	27.5	+27.5
Green	S. Philbrock	310	9.9	+9.9
Majority		1,093	35.0	+18.0
Turnout		3,125	31.5	−2.7
Labour hold		Swing	-11.7	

Beech Hill
Party	Candidate	Votes	%	±%
SLD	J. McGarty	1,725	47.7	+18.8
Labour	T. Bishop	1,621	44.9	−12.3
SLD	L. Marshall	1,603		
Labour	S. Turner	1,437		
Conservative	E. Bispham	266	7.4	−6.4
Conservative	J. Whitehead	194		
Majority		104	2.9	−25.3
Turnout		3,612	40.9	+4.8
SLD gain from Labour		Swing	+15.5	
Labour hold		Swing		

Bryn
Party	Candidate	Votes	%	±%
Labour	C. Brown	2,532	82.0	+9.1
Conservative	R. Clayton	557	18.0	+3.0
Majority		1,975	63.9	+6.1
Turnout		3,089	31.3	−6.2
Labour hold		Swing	+3.0	

Hindley
Party	Candidate	Votes	%	±%
Labour	A. Robinson	2,394	87.2	+54.5
Green	A. Wood	352	12.8	+12.8
Majority		2,042	74.3	+52.8
Turnout		2,746	28.5	−7.9
Labour hold		Swing	+20.8	

Hindley Green
Party	Candidate	Votes	%	±%
Labour	S. Murphy	2,198	80.6	+8.4
SLD	J. Cranfield	530	19.4	−8.4
Majority		1,668	61.1	+16.9
Turnout		2,728	24.1	−4.1
Labour hold		Swing	+8.4	

Hindsford
Party	Candidate	Votes	%	±%
Labour	W. Smith	2,543	78.6	+14.6
Conservative	M. Sharland	691	21.4	+21.4
Majority		1,852	57.3	+29.3
Turnout		3,234	30.2	−1.7
Labour hold		Swing	-3.4	

Hope Carr
Party	Candidate	Votes	%	±%
Labour	A. Roberts	2,013	63.0	+7.1
Conservative	E. Manson	1,183	37.0	+5.8
Majority		830	26.0	+1.3
Turnout		3,196	32.1	−4.0
Labour hold		Swing	+0.6	

Ince
Party	Candidate	Votes	%	±%
Labour	J. Horrocks	2,074	89.0	+1.2
Conservative	D. Edwards	165	7.1	+1.1
SLD	S. Cairns	92	3.9	−2.4
Majority		1,909	81.9	+0.5
Turnout		2,331	29.3	−4.7
Labour hold		Swing	+0.0	

Langtree
Party	Candidate	Votes	%	±%
Labour	J. Ball	1,924	41.8	+2.9
SLD	K. White	1,924	41.8	−2.5
Conservative	J. Wolstenholme	753	16.4	−0.4
Majority		0	0.0	−5.5
Turnout		4,601	42.0	−4.3
Labour gain from SLD		Swing	+2.9	

Leigh Central
Party	Candidate	Votes	%	±%
Labour	G. Macdonald	2,032	82.1	N/A
Conservative	M. Turner	380	15.3	N/A
Communist	H. Kedward	62	2.5	N/A
Majority		1,652	66.8	N/A
Turnout		2,474	27.6	N/A
Labour hold		Swing	N/A	

Leigh East
Party	Candidate	Votes	%	±%
Labour	J. Riley	1,973	70.9	+9.2
Conservative	M. Stewart	810	29.1	+5.1
Majority		1,163	41.8	+4.1
Turnout		2,783	27.0	−2.3
Labour hold		Swing	+2.0	

Lightshaw
Party	Candidate	Votes	%	±%
Labour	N. Holt	2,857	73.3	+14.7
Conservative	J. Wright	721	18.5	−7.6
SLD	J. Wilson	318	8.2	−7.1
Majority		2,136	54.8	+22.3
Turnout		3,896	36.8	−2.1
Labour hold		Swing	+11.1	

Newtown
Party	Candidate	Votes	%	±%
Labour	C. Hitchen	2,352	86.5	+9.5
Conservative	I. Nicholson	368	13.5	+0.1
Majority		1,984	72.9	+9.3
Turnout		2,720	29.9	−4.6
Labour hold		Swing	+4.7	

Norley
Party	Candidate	Votes	%	±%
Labour	E. Maddocks	2,337	88.5	+3.0
Conservative	J. Carrington	167	6.3	−0.4
SLD	R. Richardson	136	5.1	−2.6
Majority		2,170	82.2	+4.4
Turnout		2,640	33.5	−4.0
Labour hold		Swing	+1.7	

Orrell
Party	Candidate	Votes	%	±%
Labour	E. Swift	2,262	59.9	+13.5
Conservative	W. Smith	1,515	40.1	+8.0
Majority		747	19.8	+5.5
Turnout		3,777	37.0	−3.8
Labour hold		Swing	+2.7	

Swinley
Party	Candidate	Votes	%	±%
Conservative	W. Chadwick	2,019	48.3	+8.3
Labour	M. Gallagher	1,627	38.9	+1.9
SLD	W. Claypole	359	8.6	−14.4
Green	G. Wood	174	4.1	+4.1
Majority		392	3.4	+6.4
Turnout		4,179	46.7	−6.3
Conservative hold		Swing	+3.2	

Tyldesley East
Party	Candidate	Votes	%	±%
Labour	A. Stephenson	2,086	67.5	+11.5
SLD	A. Shaw	1,003	32.5	−11.5
Majority		1,083	35.0	+23.0
Turnout		3,089	28.7	−6.9
Labour hold		Swing	+11.5	

Whelley
Party	Candidate	Votes	%	±%
Labour	A. Coyle	2,174	81.4	+4.4
Conservative	F. Sidebotham	310	11.6	−0.6
SLD	L. Peet	185	6.9	−3.8
Majority		1,864	69.8	+5.0
Turnout		2,669	30.3	−5.7
Labour hold		Swing	+2.5	

Winstanley
Party	Candidate	Votes	%	±%
Labour	R. Winkworth	2,031	54.1	+11.8
SLD	C. Hilton	1,723	45.9	+1.1
Majority		308	8.2	+5.7
Turnout		3,754	32.1	−10.1
Labour hold		Swing	+5.3	

Worsley Mesnes
Party	Candidate	Votes	%	±%
Labour	W. Brogan	2,151	85.8	+12.1
Conservative	J. Grimshaw	355	14.2	+4.8
Majority		1,796	71.7	+14.9
Turnout		2,506	25.3	−6.2
Labour hold		Swing	+3.6	
