= Bakewell (disambiguation) =

Bakewell is a town and civil parish in Derbyshire, England, and the namesake of the Bakewell tart.

Bakewell may also refer to:

- Bakewell, Northern Territory, suburb of Palmerston, Australia
- Bakewell, Tennessee, U.S.
- Bakewell Island, Antarctica
- Bakewell, Pears and Company, a 19th-century glassmaking company in Pittsburgh

== People with the surname ==
=== In arts and media ===
- Gary Bakewell, British television actor
- Joan Bakewell (born 1933), British journalist and television presenter
- Michael Bakewell, British television producer
- Sarah Bakewell, British non-fiction writer
- William Bakewell (1908–1993), also known as Billy Bakewell, American actor

=== In politics ===
- Cathy Bakewell, Baroness Bakewell of Hardington Mandeville (born 1949), British politician
- Charles Montague Bakewell (1867–1957), American professor and politician
- Claude I. Bakewell (1912–1987), U.S. Representative from Missouri
- Danny Bakewell (born 1946), American civil rights activist and entrepreneur
- Edward Howard Bakewell (1859–1944), pastoralist and public transport official in South Australia
- Ernest Bakewell (1898–1983), English-born chemical engineer and politician
- Samuel Bakewell (1815–1888), grocer and politician in South Australia
- William Bakewell (politician) (1817–1870), solicitor and politician in South Australia

=== In sport ===
- Enid Bakewell (born 1940), English woman cricketeer
- Fred Bakewell (1908–1983), English cricketer
- George Bakewell (1864–1928), English footballer
- Marika Bakewell (born 1985), Canadian curler
- William Lincoln Bakewell (1888–1969), American sailor and adventurer

=== Others ===
- Frederick Bakewell (1800–1869), English physicist
- Robert Bakewell (disambiguation), a few people with the name
