= 1987 Wigan Metropolitan Borough Council election =

1987 UK local government election

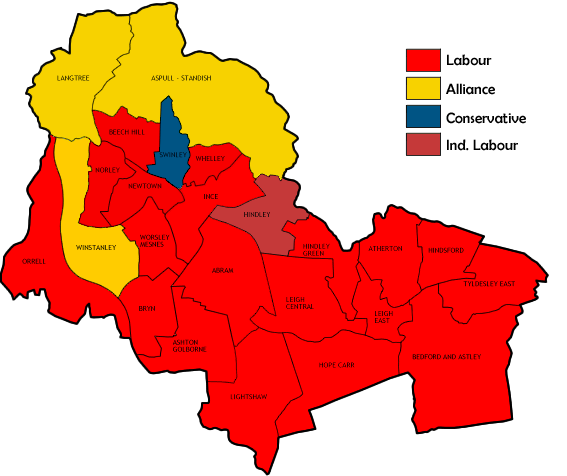
Map of the results of the 1987 Wigan council election.

Elections to the Wigan council were held on Thursday, 7 May 1987, with one third of the council up for election. Previous to the election there had been two by-elections held, resulting in a Labour gain of the seat being fought in Swinley from the Conservatives and Labour retaining one of their Hindley Green seats. Participation for this election increased substantially from the previous year's lows. Only one ward went unopposed (Leigh Central) as Labour reliably provided a full-slate of candidates, the Alliance all but Atherton and the Conservatives up from 16 to 18, by way of fielding candidates in the Labour strongholds of Abram and Worsley Mesnes this time around. An Independent Labour candidate also fought and won Hindley, with an Independent victory last seen in 1976, and Independent representation in 1980, when that same victor failed to survive the re-warding.

The results seen an end to four years of consecutive increases in Labour's share, peaking with last year's all-time high, as they slipped back into a respectable high-fifties and their loss dispersing to each of the opposition parties. Labour lost four seats in total, with the aforementioned Independent Labour loss in Hindley, an Alliance casualty from last year's elections re-elected in Winstanley, another loss to Alliance in Aspull-Standish and the Conservatives comfortable retaking the seat in Swinley they'd lost in the earlier mentioned by-election. These losses were offset somewhat by a gain from Alliance in Tyldesley East, returning the ward to entire Labour representation. Overall turnout rose to an above-average 37.1%.

== Election result ==
Wigan local election result 1987
Party	Seats	Gains	Losses	Net gain/loss	Seats %	Votes %	Votes	+/−
Labour	19	1	4	-3	79.2	59.3	49,800	-5.7
Alliance	3	2	1	+1	12.5	23.1	19,406	+1.3
Conservative	1	1	0	+1	4.2	15.3	12,820	+2.2
Independent Labour	1	1	0	+1	4.2	2.2	1,894	+2.2

This result had the following consequences for the total number of seats on the council after the elections:

Party	Previous council	New council
Labour	65	62
SDP-Liberal Alliance	5	6
Conservatives	2	3
Independent Labour	0	1
Total	72	72
Working majority	58	52

== Ward results ==
Abram
Party	Candidate	Votes	%	±%
Labour	N. Cumberbach	2,687	80.0	N/A
Conservative	J. Wright	377	11.2	N/A
Alliance	R. Murphy	296	8.8	N/A
Majority		2,310	68.7	N/A
Turnout		3,360	34.8	N/A
Labour hold		Swing	N/A	

Ashton-Golborne
Party	Candidate	Votes	%	±%
Labour	J. Hilton	2,206	65.3	−7.3
Conservative	S. Edwards	718	21.2	+6.2
Alliance	B. Miners	453	13.4	+1.2
Majority		1,488	44.0	−13.5
Turnout		3,377	34.6	+4.3
Labour hold		Swing	-6.7	

Aspull-Standish
Party	Candidate	Votes	%	±%
Alliance	G. Davies	2,153	42.0	+0.5
Labour	A. Durkin	2,117	41.3	−4.6
Conservative	K. Hart	860	16.7	+4.0
Majority		36	0.7	−3.7
Turnout		5,130	49.4	+4.8
Alliance gain from Labour		Swing	+2.5	

Atherton
Party	Candidate	Votes	%	±%
Labour	J. Sumner	2,507	76.1	−6.6
Conservative	M. Sharland	1,418	23.8	+6.6
Majority		1,722	52.3	−13.1
Turnout		3,292	35.0	+5.4
Labour hold		Swing	-6.6	

Bedford-Astley
Party	Candidate	Votes	%	±%
Labour	H. Hayes	1,999	58.5	−9.1
Alliance	D. Wilkinson	1,418	41.5	+9.1
Majority		581	17.0	−18.2
Turnout		3,417	34.2	+3.5
Labour hold		Swing	-9.1	

Beech Hill
Party	Candidate	Votes	%	±%
Labour	H. Antill	1,834	57.2	−17.0
Alliance	J. McGarty	929	29.0	+13.7
Conservative	R. Gibson	442	13.8	+3.2
Majority		905	28.2	−30.7
Turnout		3,205	36.1	+4.2
Labour hold		Swing	-15.3	

Bryn
Party	Candidate	Votes	%	±%
Labour	J. Foster	2,709	72.9	−5.9
Conservative	R. Clayton	560	15.1	+3.8
Alliance	W. Claypole	448	12.0	+2.0
Majority		2,149	57.8	−9.7
Turnout		3,717	37.5	+3.7
Labour hold		Swing	-4.8	

Hindley
Party	Candidate	Votes	%	±%
Independent Labour	E. Edwardson	1,894	54.2	N/A
Labour	M. O'Halloran	1,140	32.6	N/A
Alliance	S. Galeazzi	459	13.1	N/A
Majority		754	21.6	N/A
Turnout		3,493	36.4	N/A
Independent Labour gain from Labour		Swing	N/A	

Hindley Green
Party	Candidate	Votes	%	±%
Labour	R. McAllister	2,275	72.1	N/A
Alliance	J. Cranfield	880	27.9	N/A
Majority		1,395	44.2	N/A
Turnout		3,155	28.2	N/A
Labour hold		Swing	N/A	

Hindsford
Party	Candidate	Votes	%	±%
Labour	S. Little	2,189	64.0	−9.3
Alliance	S. Jones	1,232	36.0	+9.3
Majority		957	28.0	−18.7
Turnout		3,421	32.0	+3.6
Labour hold		Swing	-9.3	

Hope Carr
Party	Candidate	Votes	%	±%
Labour	L. Birtles	1,976	55.8	−10.2
Conservative	E. Manson	1,103	31.2	−2.7
Alliance	G. Pullin	460	13.0	+13.0
Majority		873	24.7	−7.5
Turnout		3,539	36.2	+1.8
Labour hold		Swing	-3.7	

Ince
Party	Candidate	Votes	%	±%
Labour	D. Molyneaux	2,385	87.7	−1.2
Alliance	A. Robinson	172	6.3	+0.5
Conservative	D. Edwards	161	5.9	+0.7
Majority		2,213	81.4	−1.7
Turnout		2,718	34.0	+0.6
Labour hold		Swing	-0.8	

Langtree
Party	Candidate	Votes	%	±%
Alliance	S. Jeffers	2,220	44.4	−2.6
Labour	S. Turner	1,945	38.9	−4.6
Conservative	J. Wolstenholme	839	16.8	+7.2
Majority		275	5.5	+2.0
Turnout		5,004	46.3	−0.9
Alliance hold		Swing	+1.0	

Leigh Central
Party	Candidate	Votes	%	±%
Labour		Unopposed	N/A	N/A
Labour hold		Swing	N/A	

Leigh East
Party	Candidate	Votes	%	±%
Labour	D. Caley	1,857	61.6	−12.4
Conservative	M. Turner	722	24.0	−1.9
Alliance	P. Claypole	433	14.4	+14.4
Majority		1,135	37.7	−10.5
Turnout		3,012	29.3	+1.6
Labour hold		Swing	-5.2	

Lightshaw
Party	Candidate	Votes	%	±%
Labour	B. Strett	2,406	58.6	−8.9
Conservative	G. Jackson	1,071	26.1	+7.6
Alliance	J. Wilson	628	15.3	+1.2
Majority		1,335	32.5	−16.5
Turnout		4,105	38.9	−2.9
Labour hold		Swing	-8.2	

Newtown
Party	Candidate	Votes	%	±%
Labour	M. Milligan	2,406	77.0	−7.0
Conservative	I. Nicholson	419	13.4	+4.8
Alliance	W. Hewer	300	9.6	+2.2
Majority		1,987	63.6	−11.8
Turnout		3,125	34.5	+3.0
Labour hold		Swing	-5.9	

Norley
Party	Candidate	Votes	%	±%
Labour	J. Smith	2,544	85.5	−2.7
Alliance	R. Richardson	231	7.8	+1.0
Conservative	J. Carrington	200	6.7	+1.7
Majority		2,313	77.7	−3.7
Turnout		2,975	37.5	+2.1
Labour hold		Swing	-1.8	

Orrell
Party	Candidate	Votes	%	±%
Labour	R. Capstick	1,946	46.4	−0.3
Conservative	D. Patmore	1,346	32.1	+10.2
Alliance	N. Somers	903	21.5	−9.9
Majority		600	14.3	−0.8
Turnout		4,195	40.8	+1.2
Labour hold		Swing	-5.2	

Swinley
Party	Candidate	Votes	%	±%
Conservative	M. Dowling	1,908	40.0	+1.8
Labour	M. Gallagher	1,767	37.0	+0.4
Alliance	C. Rhys	1,096	23.0	−2.2
Majority		141	2.9	+1.3
Turnout		4,771	53.0	+5.5
Conservative gain from Labour		Swing	+0.7	

Tyldesley East
Party	Candidate	Votes	%	±%
Labour	C. Hopkinson	2,104	56.0	−5.6
Alliance	A. Shaw	1,653	44.0	+5.6
Majority		451	12.0	−11.1
Turnout		3,757	35.7	−3.6
Labour gain from Alliance		Swing	-5.6	

Whelley
Party	Candidate	Votes	%	±%
Labour	M. Pendleton	2,448	77.0	−2.9
Conservative	F. Sidebotham	387	12.2	+3.8
Alliance	D. Armstrong	342	10.7	−0.9
Majority		2,061	64.9	−3.4
Turnout		3,177	36.0	+0.5
Labour hold		Swing	-3.3	

Winstanley
Party	Candidate	Votes	%	±%
Alliance	J. Fitzpatrick	2,171	44.8	+1.1
Labour	G. Taberner	2,049	42.2	−4.0
Conservative	N. Edmond	630	13.0	+2.9
Majority		122	2.5	−0.0
Turnout		4,850	42.2	+2.1
Alliance gain from Labour		Swing	+2.5	

Worsley Mesnes
Party	Candidate	Votes	%	±%
Labour	B. Baldwin	2,304	73.7	−10.5
Alliance	B. Pryle	529	16.9	+1.2
Conservative	C. Michaels	292	9.3	+9.3
Majority		1,775	56.8	−11.7
Turnout		3,125	31.5	+3.8
Labour hold		Swing	-5.8	
