= 1986 Wigan Metropolitan Borough Council election =

1986 UK local government election

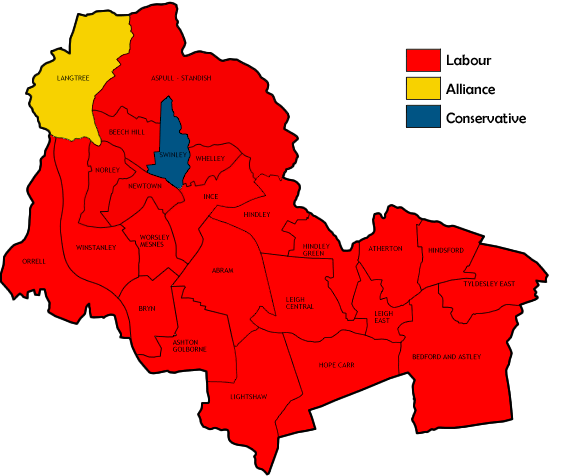
Map of the results of the 1986 Wigan council election

Elections to the Wigan council were held on Thursday, 8 May 1986, with one-third of the seats scheduled for re-election. Since the previous election three by-elections had taken place, with Labour gaining the seat being fought in Orrell from the Conservatives as well as holding their seats in Bedford-Astley and Beech Hill. The election seen fewer contestants than any previous election since the council's creation in 1973, with a record of four seats (Abram, Hindley, Hindley Green and Leigh Central) unchallenged. Even amongst those contested there were no minor parties represented, the fewest Alliance candidates since the 1980 election and a record low of Conservative contenders at sixteen. The results were similarly record-breaking as Labour won twenty-two seats, with the Conservative and Alliance majorities in their respective heartland wards—and only holds—of Swinley and Langtree reduced to slender majorities. Labour won a high of 65% share of the vote, conversely the Conservatives share fell to a low of 13.1%, with their actual vote dropping into four figures for the first time. Overall turnout rose from the preceding year's underwhelming figure of 29.2%, to a more commonplace 35.8%.

== Election result ==
Wigan local election result 1986
Party	Seats	Gains	Losses	Net gain/loss	Seats %	Votes %	Votes	+/−
Labour	22	3	0	+3	91.7	65.0	45,205	+2.8%
Alliance	1	0	3	-3	4.2	21.8	15,171	+2.2%
Conservative	1	0	0	0	4.2	13.1	9,136	-4.9%

This result had the following consequences for the total number of seats on the Council after the elections:

Party	Previous council	New council
Labour	61	64
SDP-Liberal Alliance	8	5
Conservatives	3	3
Total	72	72
Working majority	50	56

== Ward results ==
Abram
Party	Candidate	Votes	%	±%
Labour	I. McCartney	Unopposed	N/A	N/A
Labour hold		Swing	N/A	

Ashton-Golborne
Party	Candidate	Votes	%	±%
Labour	S. Lea	2,124	72.7	+6.4
Conservative	J. Wright	441	15.1	−2.3
Alliance	H. Crook	358	12.2	−4.1
Majority		1,683	57.6	+8.8
Turnout		2,923	30.2	+0.8
Labour hold		Swing	+4.3	

Aspull-Standish
Party	Candidate	Votes	%	±%
Labour	J. Hilton	2,222	45.8	+4.1
Alliance	G. Davies	2,009	41.4	−1.4
Conservative	K. Hart	616	12.7	−2.7
Majority		213	4.4	+2.0
Turnout		2,796	29.6	−9.1
Labour gain from Alliance		Swing	+2.7	

Atherton
Party	Candidate	Votes	%	±%
Labour	L. Sumner	2,313	82.7	+3.6
Conservative	M. Sharland	483	17.3	−3.6
Majority		1,830	65.4	+7.2
Turnout		2,796	29.6	−9.1
Labour hold		Swing	+3.6	

Bedford-Astley
Party	Candidate	Votes	%	±%
Labour	F. Walker	2,051	67.6	+13.1
Alliance	W. Shaw	983	32.4	+14.5
Majority		1,068	35.2	+8.4
Turnout		3,034	30.7	−7.7
Labour hold		Swing	-0.7	

Beech Hill
Party	Candidate	Votes	%	±%
Labour	J. Parkinson	2,090	74.2	+5.1
Alliance	R. Richardson	430	15.2	−1.7
Conservative	E. Nicholson	297	10.5	−3.4
Majority		1,660	58.9	+6.9
Turnout		2,817	31.9	−0.2
Labour hold		Swing	+3.4	

Bryn
Party	Candidate	Votes	%	±%
Labour	A. Melling	2,649	78.8	+6.1
Conservative	C. Michaels	377	11.2	−1.4
Alliance	D. Ramsdale	337	10.0	−4.8
Majority		2,272	67.6	+9.7
Turnout		3,363	33.9	+0.9
Labour hold		Swing	+3.7	

Hindley
Party	Candidate	Votes	%	±%
Labour	G. Green	Unopposed	N/A	N/A
Labour hold		Swing	N/A	

Hindley
Party	Candidate	Votes	%	±%
Labour	G. Green	Unopposed	N/A	N/A
Labour hold		Swing	N/A	

Hindley Green
Party	Candidate	Votes	%	±%
Labour	T. Wynn	Unopposed	N/A	N/A
Labour hold		Swing	N/A	

Hindsford
Party	Candidate	Votes	%	±%
Labour	A. Wright	2,216	73.3	−8.6
Alliance	S. Jones	806	26.7	+26.7
Majority		1,410	46.7	−17.2
Turnout		3,022	28.4	−0.9
Labour hold		Swing	-17.6	

Hope Carr
Party	Candidate	Votes	%	±%
Labour	J. Hession	2,211	66.1	+5.3
Conservative	E. Manson	1,135	33.9	+2.6
Majority		1,076	32.2	+2.7
Turnout		3,346	34.4	−3.0
Labour hold		Swing	+1.3	

Ince
Party	Candidate	Votes	%	±%
Labour	T. Davies	2,357	88.9	−0.3
Alliance	A. Robinson	155	5.8	−4.9
Conservative	A. Jackson	138	5.2	+5.2
Majority		2,202	83.1	+4.7
Turnout		2,650	33.4	+5.2
Labour hold		Swing	+2.3	

Langtree
Party	Candidate	Votes	%	±%
Alliance	R. Grayson	2,376	46.9	+1.7
Labour	T. O'Hagan	2,201	43.5	+4.6
Conservative	J. Wolstenholme	485	9.6	−6.3
Majority		175	3.5	−2.9
Turnout		5,062	47.3	+3.6
Alliance hold		Swing	-1.4	

Leigh Central
Party	Candidate	Votes	%	±%
Labour	P. Smith	Unopposed	N/A	N/A
Labour hold		Swing	N/A	

Leigh East
Party	Candidate	Votes	%	±%
Labour	T. Harper	2,068	74.1	+10.1
Conservative	D. Angell	723	25.9	−1.8
Majority		1,345	48.2	+11.9
Turnout		2,791	27.7	−2.1
Labour hold		Swing	+5.9	

Lightshaw
Party	Candidate	Votes	%	±%
Labour	T. Sherratt	2,955	67.5	N/A
Conservative	E. Morris	807	18.4	N/A
Alliance	J. Wilson	616	14.1	N/A
Majority		2,148	49.1	N/A
Turnout		4,378	41.8	N/A
Labour hold		Swing	N/A	

Newtown
Party	Candidate	Votes	%	±%
Labour	K. Pye	2,376	84.0	+3.9
Conservative	J. Lawson	243	8.6	−4.4
Alliance	P. Gwyn	209	7.4	+0.5
Majority		2,133	75.4	+8.4
Turnout		2,828	31.5	+1.6
Labour hold		Swing	+4.1	

Norley
Party	Candidate	Votes	%	±%
Labour	N. Turner	2,499	88.2	−0.0
Alliance	P. Coleman	191	6.7	+1.0
Conservative	E. Bispham	143	5.0	−1.0
Majority		2,308	81.5	−0.7
Turnout		2,833	35.4	+2.2
Labour hold		Swing	-0.5	

Orrell
Party	Candidate	Votes	%	±%
Labour	G. Seaward	1,898	46.7	+3.1
Alliance	H. Evans	1,281	31.5	+14.1
Conservative	J. Grimshaw	889	21.9	−17.2
Majority		617	15.2	+10.7
Turnout		4,068	39.6	+4.0
Labour hold		Swing	-5.5	

Swinley
Party	Candidate	Votes	%	±%
Conservative	C. Giles	1,637	38.2	−5.7
Labour	S. Turner	1,567	36.6	−0.8
Alliance	C. Rhys	1,079	25.2	+6.5
Majority		70	1.6	−4.8
Turnout		4,283	47.5	+6.5
Conservative hold		Swing	-2.4	

Tyldesley East
Party	Candidate	Votes	%	±%
Labour	B. Wilson	2,496	61.6	+14.6
Alliance	G. Pickthall	1,557	38.4	−3.8
Majority		939	23.2	+18.3
Turnout		4,053	39.3	−3.3
Labour gain from Alliance		Swing	+9.2	

Whelley
Party	Candidate	Votes	%	±%
Labour	W. Pendleton	2,499	79.9	+3.4
Alliance	J. Kearsley	364	11.6	−4.0
Conservative	F. Sidebotham	263	8.4	+0.6
Majority		2,135	68.3	+4.3
Turnout		3,126	35.5	+2.7
Labour hold		Swing	+3.7	

Winstanley
Party	Candidate	Votes	%	±%
Labour	W. Evans	2,104	46.2	+2.6
Alliance	J. Fitzpatrick	1,988	43.7	+1.1
Conservative	F. Fairbairn	459	10.1	−3.7
Majority		116	2.5	+1.5
Turnout		4,551	40.0	+2.1
Labour gain from Alliance		Swing	+0.7	

Worsley Mesnes
Party	Candidate	Votes	%	±%
Labour	H. Milligan	2,309	84.2	+10.1
Alliance	A. Meal	432	15.8	+0.0
Majority		1,877	68.5	+10.1
Turnout		2,741	27.7	−1.5
Labour hold		Swing	+5.0	
