= 1994 Wigan Metropolitan Borough Council election =

1994 UK local government election

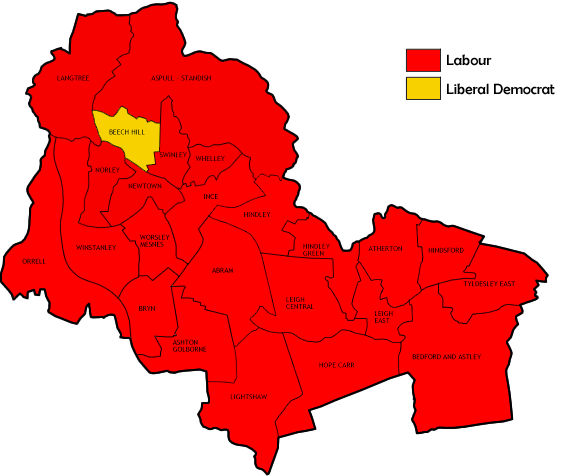
Map of the results of the 1994 Wigan council election.

Elections to the Wigan council were held on Thursday, 5 May 1994, with one third of the seats up for election. Prior to the election, Labour had defended their seats in two by-elections for Abram and Hindley. The election suffered from a mixture of a poor contesting rate and low voter turnout. The number of candidates contesting was just 50, the lowest since 1975, with four wards going unopposed, and Lib Dems back to fighting a half of the seats, and the Conservatives less than two-thirds. The only other opposition standing were three Independent Labour candidates, one of which was the previous - but since deselected - Labour incumbent for the seat being fought in Worsley Mesnes. Voter turnout rose from the previous election's nadir, but at 30.4%, still well below average.

Labour achieved their highest vote share to date, with an overwhelming 70.3% of votes cast. Conversely the Conservatives obtained both their lowest vote share, and lowest vote figure, on record. The Lib Dems, whilst suffering a drop to 16% - a figure below average for results in recent years - witnessed nothing as dramatic. Party seat totals remained unchanged, with Labour and the Lib Dems gaining a seat from each other. The Lib Dem narrowly gained (by just four votes) their third in Beech Hill, turning a ward entirely represented by Labour from the early to mid eighties, into solely Lib Dem for the first time. Labour elsewhere regained a seat in Hope Carr, returning that to entirely Labour.

== Election result ==
Wigan local election result 1994
Party	Seats	Gains	Losses	Net gain/loss	Seats %	Votes %	Votes	+/−
Labour	23	1	1	0	95.8	70.3	41,704	+14.6%
Liberal Democrats	1	1	1	0	4.2	16.0	9,520	-4.1%
Conservative	0	0	0	0	0.0	11.3	6,729	-10.2%
Independent Labour	0	0	0	0	0.0	2.3	1,343	+1.4%

This result had the following consequences for the total number of seats on the Council after the elections:

Party	Previous council	New council
Labour	61	61
Liberal Democrats	8	8
Conservatives	2	2
Independent Labour	1	1
Total	72	72
Working majority	50	50

== Ward results ==
Abram
Party	Candidate	Votes	%	±%
Labour	J. Best	2,073	89.8	+9.6
Conservative	J. Wright	235	10.2	−9.6
Majority		1,838	79.6	+19.2
Turnout		2,308	23.9	+5.3
Labour hold		Swing	+9.6	

Ashton-Golborne
Party	Candidate	Votes	%	±%
Labour	A. Bullen	2,253	77.3	+19.6
Liberal Democrats	S. Cooper	340	11.7	−3.6
Conservative	I. Cunliffe	320	11.0	−15.9
Majority		1,913	65.7	+34.8
Turnout		2,913	29.7	+10.0
Labour hold		Swing	+11.6	

Aspull-Standish
Party	Candidate	Votes	%	±%
Labour	J. Hilton	1,948	48.5	+14.0
Liberal Democrats	L. Chamberlain	1,633	40.7	−5.4
Conservative	J. Davies	432	10.8	−8.6
Majority		315	7.8	−3.7
Turnout		4,013	37.3	+5.2
Labour hold		Swing	+9.7	

Atherton
Party	Candidate	Votes	%	±%
Labour	S. Loundon	2,033	84.6	+8.2
Independent Labour	D. Graeme	370	15.4	−8.2
Majority		1,663	69.2	+16.3
Turnout		2,403	26.1	+3.9
Labour hold		Swing	+8.2	

Bedford-Astley
Party	Candidate	Votes	%	±%
Labour	F. Walker	1,717	68.8	+18.3
Liberal Democrats	G. Mann	780	31.2	+5.0
Majority		937	37.5	+13.3
Turnout		2,497	28.7	+2.5
Labour hold		Swing	+6.6	

Beech Hill
Party	Candidate	Votes	%	±%
Liberal Democrats	L. Brooks	1,621	48.0	−15.1
Labour	T. Bishop	1,617	47.9	+15.5
Conservative	J. Cartwright	138	4.1	−0.3
Majority		4	0.1	−30.7
Turnout		3,376	37.4	+4.1
Liberal Democrats gain from Labour		Swing	-15.3	

Bryn
Party	Candidate	Votes	%	±%
Labour	A. Melling	2,429	86.5	+11.4
Conservative	R. Clayton	380	13.5	−11.4
Majority		2,049	72.9	+22.9
Turnout		2,809	28.7	+7.9
Labour hold		Swing	+11.4	

Hindley
Party	Candidate	Votes	%	±%
Labour	W. Shaw	1,946	81.8	+3.7
Liberal Democrats	F. Graham	434	18.2	−3.7
Majority		1,512	63.5	+7.4
Turnout		2,380	24.8	+6.2
Labour hold		Swing	+3.7	

Hindley Green
Party	Candidate	Votes	%	±%
Labour	W. Simmons	2,407	86.0	+28.6
Conservative	A. Emmett	390	13.9	−12.8
Majority		2,017	72.1	+41.4
Turnout		2,797	24.6	+7.0
Labour hold		Swing	+20.7	

Hindsford
Party	Candidate	Votes	%	±%
Labour	A. Wright	Unopposed	N/A	N/A
Labour hold		Swing	N/A	

Hope Carr
Party	Candidate	Votes	%	±%
Labour	K. Anderson	1,812	50.4	+12.6
Liberal Democrats	P. Hough	1,254	34.9	+3.8
Conservative	D. Morris	526	14.6	−16.4
Majority		558	15.5	+8.8
Turnout		3,592	35.6	+4.9
Labour gain from Liberal Democrats		Swing	+4.4	

Ince
Party	Candidate	Votes	%	±%
Labour	W. Blackledge	Unopposed	N/A	N/A
Labour hold		Swing	N/A	

Langtree
Party	Candidate	Votes	%	±%
Labour	J. O'Neill	2,250	57.2	+21.1
Liberal Democrats	J. Shaw	1,083	27.5	−18.3
Conservative	F. Parkinson	381	9.7	+9.7
Independent Labour	H. O'Neill	218	5.5	+5.5
Majority		1,167	29.7	+19.9
Turnout		3,932	34.7	+3.4
Labour hold		Swing	+19.7	

Leigh Central
Party	Candidate	Votes	%	±%
Labour	P. Smith	Unopposed	N/A	N/A
Labour hold		Swing	N/A	

Leigh East
Party	Candidate	Votes	%	±%
Labour	T. Harper	1,870	68.6	+12.7
Liberal Democrats	S. Hide	856	31.4	−12.7
Majority		1,014	37.2	+25.3
Turnout		2,726	27.1	+6.8
Labour hold		Swing	+12.7	

Lightshaw
Party	Candidate	Votes	%	±%
Labour	T. Sherratt	3,180	80.7	+21.2
Conservative	C. Duffy	760	19.3	−21.2
Majority		2,420	61.4	+42.5
Turnout		3,940	35.8	+5.2
Labour hold		Swing	+21.2	

Newtown
Party	Candidate	Votes	%	±%
Labour	K. Pye	1,964	85.1	+12.9
Liberal Democrats	H. Wagner	183	7.9	−5.5
Conservative	G. Peach	160	6.9	−7.4
Majority		1,781	77.2	+19.3
Turnout		2,307	25.8	+9.3
Labour hold		Swing	+9.2	

Norley
Party	Candidate	Votes	%	±%
Labour	N. Tuner	1,973	85.2	+7.3
Liberal Democrats	B. Turner	343	14.8	+1.7
Majority		1,630	70.4	+5.7
Turnout		2,316	30.4	+9.7
Labour hold		Swing	+2.8	

Orrell
Party	Candidate	Votes	%	±%
Labour	G. Seaward	2,133	70.7	+19.1
Conservative	G. Whiston	884	29.3	−19.1
Majority		1,249	41.4	+38.2
Turnout		3,017	31.9	+5.5
Labour hold		Swing	+19.1	

Swinley
Party	Candidate	Votes	%	±%
Labour	S. Turner	2,032	62.9	+24.2
Conservative	M. Winstanley	1,198	37.1	−15.8
Majority		834	25.8	+11.7
Turnout		3,230	36.8	+2.8
Labour hold		Swing	+20.0	

Tyldesley East
Party	Candidate	Votes	%	±%
Labour	B. Wilson	Unopposed	N/A	N/A
Labour hold		Swing	N/A	

Whelley
Party	Candidate	Votes	%	±%
Labour	W. Pendleton	2,125	88.4	+22.3
Conservative	T. Sharpe	279	11.6	−4.6
Majority		1,846	76.8	+26.9
Turnout		2,404	28.8	+8.5
Labour hold		Swing	+13.4	

Winstanley
Party	Candidate	Votes	%	±%
Labour	W. Evans	2,168	64.3	+11.5
Liberal Democrats	P. Evans	721	21.4	−0.5
Conservative	M. Green	483	14.3	−11.1
Majority		1,447	42.9	+15.5
Turnout		3,372	28.6	+7.7
Labour hold		Swing	+6.0	

Worsley Mesnes
Party	Candidate	Votes	%	±%
Labour	W. Rotherham	1,774	59.8	−5.3
Independent Labour	H. Milligan	755	25.5	+25.5
Liberal Democrats	W. Sly	272	9.2	−9.1
Conservative	T. Sutton	163	5.5	−11.0
Majority		1,019	34.4	−12.5
Turnout		2,964	29.8	+12.5
Labour hold		Swing	-15.4	
