= 1984 Wigan Metropolitan Borough Council election =

1984 UK local government election

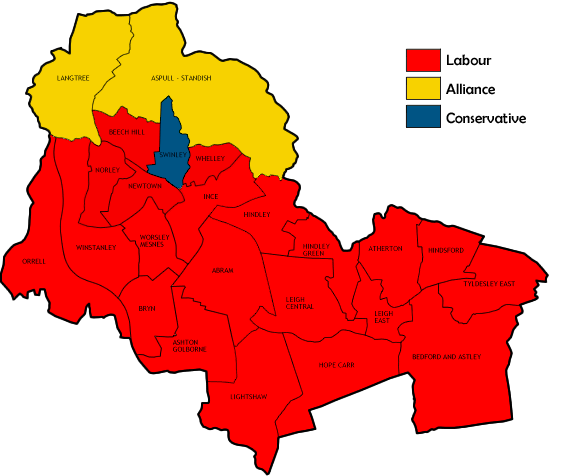
Map of the results of the 1984 Wigan council election.

Elections to the Wigan council were held on Thursday, 3 May 1984, with one third of the seats up for vote. Three wards – Abram, Hindley and Lightshaw – were unopposed, leaving only twenty one of the twenty four wards going to vote – a number not seen since 1975. Also of note was the re-emergence of a fourth party, in the way of persistent Communist candidate H. Kedward contesting Leigh Central after a three-year absence. The election itself seen a Labour gain in Orrell from the Conservatives, which cancelled out the simultaneous Alliance gain from Labour in Aspell-Standish, leaving their majority unchanged. Overall turnout slumped to 29.2%, the lowest level since the aforementioned 1975 election.

== Election result ==
Wigan local election result 1984
Party	Seats	Gains	Losses	Net gain/loss	Seats %	Votes %	Votes	+/−
Labour	21	1	1	0	87.5	62.2	43,977	+5.2%
Alliance	2	1	0	+1	8.3	19.6	13,856	-6.3%
Conservative	1	0	1	-1	4.2	18.0	12,762	+0.9%
Communist	0	0	0	0	0.0	0.1	59	+0.1%

This result had the following consequences for the total number of seats on the Council after the elections:

Party	Previous council	New council
Labour	60	60
SDP-Liberal Alliance	7	8
Conservatives	5	4
Total	72	72
Working majority	48	48

== Ward results ==
Abram
Party	Candidate	Votes	%	±%
Labour	A. Bennett	Unopposed	N/A	N/A
Labour hold		Swing	N/A	

Ashton-Golborne
Party	Candidate	Votes	%	±%
Labour	T. Jones	1,857	66.2	+2.4
Conservative	M. Fox	488	17.4	+17.4
Alliance	A. Howarth	460	16.4	−19.8
Majority		1,369	48.8	21.2
Turnout		2,805	29.4	−1.3
Labour hold		Swing	-7.5	

Aspull-Standish
Party	Candidate	Votes	%	±%
Alliance	P. Wilson	2,274	44.1	+3.5
Labour	J. Hilton	2,149	41.7	+0.8
Conservative	P. Walker	728	14.1	−4.3
Majority		125	2.4	+2.2
Turnout		5,151	50.9	−1.8
Alliance gain from Labour		Swing	+1.3	

Atherton
Party	Candidate	Votes	%	±%
Labour	J. Clarke	2,921	79.1	+6.2
Conservative	M. Hatton	770	20.9	+4.3
Majority		2,151	58.3	+1.9
Turnout		3,691	38.8	+0.5
Labour hold		Swing	+0.9	

Bedford-Astley
Party	Candidate	Votes	%	±%
Labour	J. Jones	2,039	54.5	+7.4
Conservative	F. Hawley	1,036	27.7	+0.9
Alliance	R. Mateer	668	17.8	−8.3
Majority		1,003	26.8	+6.5
Turnout		3,743	38.4	−2.1
Labour hold		Swing	+3.2	

Beech Hill
Party	Candidate	Votes	%	±%
Labour	T. Bishop	1,963	69.0	+11.4
Alliance	G. Pullin	483	17.0	−1.0
Conservative	J. Wolstenholme	397	14.0	−10.3
Majority		1,480	52.1	+21.7
Turnout		2,843	32.1	−6.6
Labour hold		Swing	+6.2	

Bryn
Party	Candidate	Votes	%	±%
Labour	G. Lockett	2,355	72.6	+6.5
Alliance	D. Seary	480	14.8	−19.1
Conservative	C. Michaels	408	12.6	+12.6
Majority		1,875	57.8	+25.6
Turnout		3,243	32.9	−6.9
Labour hold		Swing	+12.8	

Hindley
Party	Candidate	Votes	%	±%
Labour	A. Robinson	Unopposed	N/A	N/A
Labour hold		Swing	N/A	

Hindley Green
Party	Candidate	Votes	%	±%
Labour	S. Murphy	2,387	77.8	+30.7
Alliance	M. O'Halloran	681	22.2	−3.9
Majority		1,706	55.6	+35.3
Turnout		3,068	28.4	−12.1
Labour hold		Swing	+17.3	

Hindsford
Party	Candidate	Votes	%	±%
Labour	W. Smith	2,545	81.9	+15.7
Conservative	C. Rigby	561	18.1	+18.1
Majority		1,984	63.9	+31.5
Turnout		3,106	29.3	−3.3
Labour hold		Swing	-1.2	

Hope Carr
Party	Candidate	Votes	%	±%
Labour	A. Roberts	2,179	60.8	+6.1
Conservative	E. Manson	1,122	31.3	−1.5
Alliance	L. Seal	284	7.9	−4.5
Majority		1,057	29.5	+7.6
Turnout		3,585	37.4	−5.2
Labour hold		Swing	+3.8	

Ince
Party	Candidate	Votes	%	±%
Labour	A. Banks	2,017	89.2	+7.0
Alliance	A. Robinson	244	10.8	−7.0
Majority		1,773	78.4	+14.0
Turnout		2,261	28.2	−9.8
Labour hold		Swing	+7.0	

Langtree
Party	Candidate	Votes	%	±%
Alliance	J. Pigott	2,053	45.2	−3.6
Labour	T. O'Hagan	1,762	38.8	+6.7
Conservative	R. Gibson	723	15.9	−3.1
Majority		291	6.4	−10.2
Turnout		4,538	43.7	+2.1
Alliance hold		Swing	-5.1	

Leigh Central
Party	Candidate	Votes	%	±%
Labour	G. Macdonald	2,164	81.1	+7.1
Conservative	S. Emerton	445	16.7	+1.0
Communist	H. Kedward	59	2.2	+2.2
Majority		1,719	64.4	+6.1
Turnout		2,668	29.5	−3.0
Labour hold		Swing	+3.0	

Leigh East
Party	Candidate	Votes	%	±%
Labour	J. Riley	1,914	64.0	+11.3
Conservative	M. Stewart	830	27.7	−0.2
Alliance	I. Smith	248	8.3	−11.1
Majority		1,084	36.2	+11.5
Turnout		2,992	29.8	−5.4
Labour hold		Swing	+5.7	

Lightshaw
Party	Candidate	Votes	%	±%
Labour	N. Holt	Unopposed	N/A	N/A
Labour hold		Swing	N/A	

Newtown
Party	Candidate	Votes	%	±%
Labour	A. Peet	2,195	80.1	+7.8
Conservative	J. Lawson	357	13.0	−1.8
Alliance	W. Hewer	189	6.9	−6.0
Majority		1,838	67.1	+9.5
Turnout		2,741	29.9	−3.8
Labour hold		Swing	+4.8	

Norley
Party	Candidate	Votes	%	±%
Labour	E. Maddocks	2,444	88.2	+9.6
Conservative	J. Davies	168	6.1	+0.4
Alliance	R. Richardson	158	5.7	−10.0
Majority		2,276	82.2	+19.3
Turnout		2,770	33.1	−3.7
Labour hold		Swing	+5.0	

Orrell
Party	Candidate	Votes	%	±%
Labour	E. Swift	1,576	43.6	+2.3
Conservative	F. Fairbairn	1,414	39.1	+0.1
Alliance	C. Hughes	627	17.3	−2.4
Majority		162	4.5	+2.2
Turnout		3,617	35.5	−6.6
Labour gain from Conservative		Swing	+1.1	

Swinley
Party	Candidate	Votes	%	±%
Conservative	C. Bond	1,637	43.9	−2.1
Labour	P. Lees	1,395	37.4	+3.7
Alliance	E. Parkin	697	18.7	−1.5
Majority		242	6.5	−5.8
Turnout		3,729	41.0	−3.6
Conservative hold		Swing	-2.9	

Tyldesley East
Party	Candidate	Votes	%	±%
Labour	J. Teece	1,986	47.0	+1.8
Alliance	B. Aitken	1,783	42.2	−12.6
Conservative	E. Griffiths	457	10.8	+10.8
Majority		203	4.8	−4.9
Turnout		4,226	42.6	−1.0
Labour hold		Swing	+7.2	

Whelley
Party	Candidate	Votes	%	±%
Labour	A. Coyle	2,224	76.5	+12.4
Conservative	F. Sidebotham	362	12.4	−0.8
Alliance	K. Latham	322	11.1	−11.6
Majority		1,862	64.0	+22.7
Turnout		2,908	32.8	−5.5
Labour hold		Swing	+6.6	

Winstanley
Party	Candidate	Votes	%	±%
Labour	J. Whittle	1,798	43.6	+4.0
Alliance	H. Evans	1,757	42.6	+5.9
Conservative	C. Mugan	570	13.8	−9.9
Majority		41	1.0	−1.9
Turnout		4,125	37.9	−3.3
Labour hold		Swing	-0.9	

Worsley Mesnes
Party	Candidate	Votes	%	±%
Labour	W. Brogan	2,107	74.1	+7.3
Alliance	A. Meal	448	15.8	−5.6
Conservative	F. Hesketh	289	10.2	−1.7
Majority		1,659	58.3	+13.0
Turnout		2,844	29.2	−6.9
Labour hold		Swing	+6.4	
