= 1976 Wigan Metropolitan Borough Council election =

1976 UK local government election

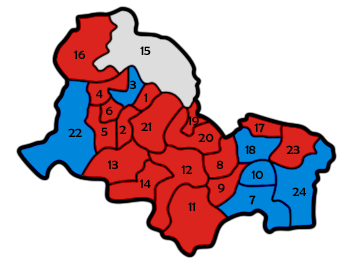
Map of the results for the 1976 Wigan council election. Labour in red, Conservatives in blue and Independent in grey.

Elections to Wigan Council were held on 6 May 1976, with one third of the seats up for election. Four Conservative gains and an Independent in Ward 23 regaining a seat reduced Labour's working majority to 40 seats. Two seats (Ward 4 and Ward 21) went uncontested, and turnout rose to 34.0% - a return to 1973 levels after a sizeable fall the previous year.

== Election result ==
Wigan local election result 1976
Party	Seats	Gains	Losses	Net gain/loss	Seats %	Votes %	Votes	+/−
Labour	17	0	5	-5	70.8	51.3	35,499	+2.1
Conservative	6	4	0	+4	25.0	40.8	28,260	0.0
Independent	1	1	0	+1	4.2	2.9	2,038	+0.4
Liberal	0	0	0	0	0.0	3.9	2,732	-2.9
ER	0	0	0	0	0.0	0.6	392	+0.6
Communist	0	0	0	0	0.0	0.4	309	-0.3

This result had the following consequences for the total number of seats on the Council after the elections:

Party	Previous council	New council
Labour	61	56
Conservatives	10	14
Liberals	1	1
Independent	0	1
Total	72	72
Working majority	50	40

== Ward results ==
Ward 1 (Lindsay-Scholes-Whelley)
Party	Candidate	Votes	%	±%
Labour	A. Coyle	1,927	63.1	−1.0
Conservative	C. Giles	1,126	36.9	+1.0
Majority		801	26.2	−2.0
Turnout		3,053	33.1	+4.1
Labour hold		Swing	-1.0	

Ward 2 (Poolstock-Worsley Mesnes)
Party	Candidate	Votes	%	±%
Labour	H. Milligan	1,419	62.5	−3.0
Conservative	J. Atherton	536	23.6	−10.8
Liberal	J. Forster	314	13.8	+13.8
Majority		883	38.9	+7.7
Turnout		2,269	24.7	+7.6
Labour hold		Swing	+3.9	

Ward 3 (Gidlow-Swinley-Whitley)
Party	Candidate	Votes	%	±%
Conservative	G. Lewthwaite	2,655	69.2	+4.7
Labour	M. Pendleton	1,187	30.8	+7.8
Majority		1,478	38.4	−3.1
Turnout		3,852	33.4	+1.1
Conservative hold		Swing	-1.5	

Ward 4 (Beech Hill and Marsh Green)
Party	Candidate	Votes	%	±%
Labour	A. Eckersley	Unopposed	N/A	N/A
Labour hold		Swing	N/A	

Ward 5 (Highfield and Lamberhead)
Party	Candidate	Votes	%	±%
Labour	E. Maddocks	1,544	53.4	+2.3
Conservative	T. Peet	1,348	46.6	+4.4
Majority		196	6.8	−2.1
Turnout		2,892	26.4	+4.9
Labour hold		Swing	-1.0	

Ward 6 (Newtown and Rose Hill)
Party	Candidate	Votes	%	±%
Labour	J. Bridge	1,483	62.0	−6.5
Conservative	M. Wright	670	28.0	−3.5
Liberal	J. Fitzpatrick	240	10.0	+10.0
Majority		813	34.0	−3.0
Turnout		2,393	27.4	+8.8
Labour hold		Swing	-1.5	

Ward 7 (Hope Carr)
Party	Candidate	Votes	%	±%
Conservative	B. Powell	1,770	56.2	−3.1
Labour	J. Jones	1,377	43.8	+3.1
Majority		393	12.5	−6.4
Turnout		3,147	44.9	+7.4
Conservative gain from Labour		Swing	-3.1	

Ward 8 (St Pauls and St Peters)
Party	Candidate	Votes	%	±%
Labour	P. Hull	1,336	58.9	+3.4
Conservative	J. Davies	842	37.1	−1.3
Communist	H. Kedward	92	4.1	−2.1
Majority		494	21.8	+4.7
Turnout		2,270	25.8	+9.0
Labour hold		Swing	+2.3	

Ward 9 (Etherstone and St Marys)
Party	Candidate	Votes	%	±%
Labour	J. Riley	1,674	51.6	+10.2
Conservative	H. Davies	1,477	45.5	−9.1
Communist	J. Blackburn	96	3.0	−1.0
Majority		197	6.1	−7.2
Turnout		3,247	35.3	+9.6
Labour hold		Swing	+9.6	

Ward 10 (Lilford-St Josephs-St Thomas)
Party	Candidate	Votes	%	±%
Conservative	S. Johnson	1,905	52.6	−12.4
Labour	P. Smith	1,595	44.0	+9.0
Communist	M. Fitzpatrick	121	3.3	+3.3
Majority		310	8.6	−21.4
Turnout		3,621	40.1	+8.8
Conservative gain from Labour		Swing	-10.7	

Ward 11 (Golborne St Thomas and Lowton)
Party	Candidate	Votes	%	±%
Labour	T. Morgan	2,409	58.7	−0.1
Conservative	T. Thompson	1,696	41.3	+0.1
Majority		713	17.4	−0.2
Turnout		4,105	39.7	+5.2
Labour hold		Swing	-0.1	

Ward 12 (Golborne Heath Park and Ashton)
Party	Candidate	Votes	%	±%
Labour	M. Taylor	2,395	70.2	N/A
Conservative	J. Harrison	1,015	29.8	N/A
Majority		1,380	40.5	N/A
Turnout		3,410	37.9	N/A
Labour hold		Swing	N/A	

Ward 13 (Ashton-in-Makerfield North and West)
Party	Candidate	Votes	%	±%
Labour	G. Lockett	1,648	67.6	−4.8
Liberal	P. Scully	789	32.4	+4.8
Majority		859	35.2	−9.4
Turnout		2,437	32.0	+10.3
Labour hold		Swing	-4.8	

Ward 14 (Ashton-in-Makerfield Central and East)
Party	Candidate	Votes	%	±%
Labour	T. Jones	1,655	52.4	+3.8
Conservative	M. Ball	915	29.0	+29.0
Liberal	D. Gauld	586	18.6	−32.8
Majority		740	23.4	+20.6
Turnout		3,156	37.9	+11.3
Labour hold		Swing	-12.6	

Ward 15 (Standish with Langtree and Shevington)
Party	Candidate	Votes	%	±%
Independent	G. Dewhurst	1,534	36.0	+1.5
Labour	J. Healen	1,509	35.4	−0.3
Conservative	M. Wardle	1,222	28.7	+8.6
Majority		25	0.6	−0.6
Turnout		4,265	38.8	+3.6
Independent gain from Labour		Swing	+0.9	

Ward 16 (Aspull)
Party	Candidate	Votes	%	±%
Labour	W. Mason	1,540	45.1	−14.0
Conservative	E. Slevin	1,424	41.7	+41.7
Liberal	P. Gibbons	448	13.1	−27.7
Majority		116	3.4	−15.0
Turnout		3,412	34.2	+12.0
Labour hold		Swing	-27.8	

Ward 17 (Atherton North East)
Party	Candidate	Votes	%	±%
Labour	L. Sumner	2,121	66.5	+12.4
Conservative	E. Sweeney	1,068	33.5	−3.1
Majority		1,053	33.0	+15.4
Turnout		3,189	33.5	+3.7
Labour hold		Swing	+7.7	

Ward 18 (Atherton South West)
Party	Candidate	Votes	%	±%
Conservative	M. Williams	1,431	59.3	−5.2
Labour	P. Needham	981	40.7	+5.2
Majority		450	18.6	−10.4
Turnout		2,412	37.7	+7.6
Conservative hold		Swing	-5.2	

Ward 19 (Hindley Central and North)
Party	Candidate	Votes	%	±%
Labour	T. Isherwood	1,410	66.7	+2.1
Conservative	R. Park	704	33.3	−2.1
Majority		706	33.4	+4.2
Turnout		2,114	28.1	+5.9
Labour hold		Swing	+2.1	

Ward 20 (Hindley South East and West)
Party	Candidate	Votes	%	±%
Labour	R. MacAllister	1,573	49.8	+1.5
Conservative	T. Whitfield	1,231	39.0	−12.7
Liberal	B. Slinger	355	11.2	+11.2
Majority		342	10.8	+7.3
Turnout		3,159	30.0	+4.5
Labour hold		Swing	+7.1	

Ward 21 (Ince-in-Makerfield)
Party	Candidate	Votes	%	±%
Labour	A. Rowlandson	Unopposed	N/A	N/A
Labour hold		Swing	N/A	

Ward 22 (Orrell and Billinge)
Party	Candidate	Votes	%	±%
Conservative	F. Garner	1,897	44.1	−19.2
Labour	S. Waring	1,507	35.0	−1.6
Independent	N. Somers	504	11.7	+11.7
ER	A. Atherton	392	9.1	+9.1
Majority		390	9.1	−17.5
Turnout		4,300	32.5	−2.3
Conservative gain from Labour		Swing	-8.8	

Ward 23 (Tyldesley - Shakerley)
Party	Candidate	Votes	%	±%
Labour	M. Devlin	1,761	53.7	−5.0
Conservative	F. Mellor	1,516	46.3	+5.0
Majority		245	7.4	−10.1
Turnout		3,277	38.5	+9.1
Labour hold		Swing	-5.0	

Ward 24 (Tyldesley - Astley Green and Blackmoor)
Party	Candidate	Votes	%	±%
Conservative	C. Hampson	1,802	55.4	N/A
Labour	F. Walker	1,448	44.6	N/A
Majority		354	10.8	N/A
Turnout		3,250	42.6	N/A
Conservative gain from Labour		Swing	N/A	
