= 1982 Wigan Metropolitan Borough Council election =

1982 UK local government election

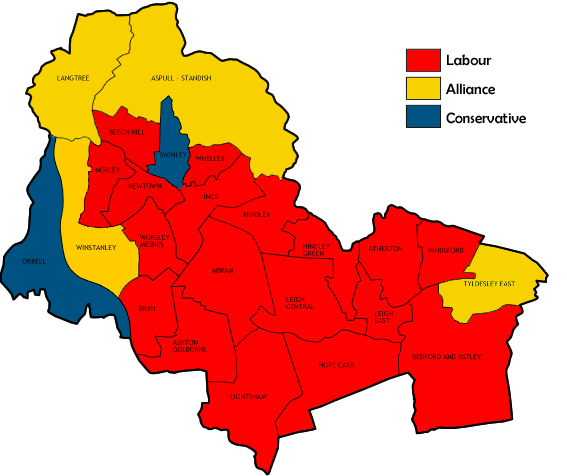
Map of the results of the 1982 Wigan council election.

Elections to the Wigan Council were held on Thursday, 6 May 1982, with one third of the council up for election. The newly formed Alliance made three gains, replacing the Conservatives as the main opposition to Labour. The Alliance massively increased upon the Liberals' past participation, contesting every ward, in marked contrast to a year in which candidate variety fell to a low, with only the former Labour councillor, standing again as Independent Labour in Hindley ward, not representing the three aforementioned choices. Overall turnout was down 2.6% to 33.6%.

== Election result ==
Wigan local election result 1982
Party	Seats	Gains	Losses	Net gain/loss	Seats %	Votes %	Votes	+/−
Labour	18	0	3	-3	75.0	50.5	39,122	-8.7%
Alliance	4	3	0	+3	16.7	29.2	22,670	+22.4%
Conservative	2	0	0	0	8.3	18.9	14,692	-10.1%
Independent Labour	0	0	0	0	0.0	1.3	1,031	-0.2%

This result had the following consequences for the total number of seats on the Council after the elections:

Party	Previous council	New council
Labour	64	61
SDP-Liberal Alliance	3	6
Conservatives	5	5
Total	72	72
Working majority	56	50

== Ward results ==
Abram
Party	Candidate	Votes	%	±%
Labour	I. McCartney	2,447	73.9	−0.0
Alliance	M. O'Halloran	507	15.3	+15.3
Conservative	J. Abrahams	356	10.8	−15.2
Majority		1,940	58.6	+10.6
Turnout		3,310	33.0	+4.9
Labour hold		Swing	-7.6	

Ashton-Golborne
Party	Candidate	Votes	%	±%
Labour	S. Lea	1,452	53.7	−15.5
Alliance	K. Higham	638	23.6	+23.6
Conservative	T. Lydon	616	22.8	−8.0
Majority		814	30.1	−8.3
Turnout		2,706	28.8	−2.7
Labour hold		Swing	-19.5	

Aspull-Standish
Party	Candidate	Votes	%	±%
Alliance	M. Rutherford	1,867	42.5	+23.3
Labour	A. Hitchmough	1,558	35.5	−11.5
Conservative	J. Holland	967	22.0	−11.8
Majority		309	7.0	−6.1
Turnout		4,392	43.6	−2.9
Alliance gain from Labour		Swing	+17.4	

Atherton
Party	Candidate	Votes	%	±%
Labour	L. Sumner	1,758	54.7	−22.1
Alliance	W. Jones	814	25.3	+25.3
Conservative	M. Sharland	640	19.9	−3.2
Majority		944	29.4	−24.3
Turnout		3,212	33.6	−5.3
Labour hold		Swing	-23.7	

Bedford-Astley
Party	Candidate	Votes	%	±%
Labour	J. Prytharch	1,627	43.7	−13.9
Alliance	B. Aitken	1,116	30.0	+30.0
Conservative	C. Hampson	982	26.4	−16.1
Majority		511	13.7	−1.4
Turnout		3,725	38.3	−3.3
Labour hold		Swing	-21.9	

Beech Hill
Party	Candidate	Votes	%	±%
Labour	G. Pullin	1,603	56.0	−17.9
Alliance	S. Jeffers	804	28.1	+28.1
Conservative	J. Wolstenholme	457	16.0	−10.1
Majority		799	27.9	−19.9
Turnout		2,864	32.1	−0.2
Labour hold		Swing	-23.0	

Bryn
Party	Candidate	Votes	%	±%
Labour	R. Lyons	1,768	51.0	−23.5
Alliance	J. Walter	1,107	32.0	+31.9
Conservative	M. Jones	589	17.0	−8.4
Majority		661	19.1	−30.1
Turnout		3,464	35.5	+6.5
Labour hold		Swing	-27.7	

Hindley
Party	Candidate	Votes	%	±%
Labour	J. Bray	1,710	48.6	+0.3
Independent Labour	C. Priestley	1,031	29.3	−4.6
Alliance	W. Hewer	779	22.1	+22.1
Majority		679	19.3	+5.0
Turnout		3,520	37.0	−2.6
Labour hold		Swing	+2.4	

Hindley Green
Party	Candidate	Votes	%	±%
Labour	T. Wynn	1,405	48.9	−17.4
Alliance	I. Collingwood	763	26.5	+26.5
Conservative	D. Culshaw	706	24.6	+24.6
Majority		642	22.3	−10.3
Turnout		2,874	27.3	+3.5
Labour hold		Swing	-21.9	

Hindsford
Party	Candidate	Votes	%	±%
Labour	A. Wright	1,617	46.7	−21.9
Alliance	S. Icke	1,305	37.7	+37.7
Conservative	K. Mercer	537	15.5	−15.8
Majority		312	9.0	−28.3
Turnout		3,459	32.6	−1.3
Labour hold		Swing	-29.8	

Hope Carr
Party	Candidate	Votes	%	±%
Labour	J. Hession	1,635	42.6	−14.5
Conservative	E. Manson	1,169	30.4	−12.5
Alliance	D. Ode	1,037	27.0	+27.0
Majority		466	12.2	−2.0
Turnout		3,841	40.3	−4.0
Labour hold		Swing	-1.0	

Ince
Party	Candidate	Votes	%	±%
Labour	A. Rowlandson	1,597	72.0	−5.9
Alliance	P. Coleman	470	21.2	+21.2
Conservative	J. Michaels	150	6.8	−15.2
Majority		1,127	50.8	−5.1
Turnout		2,217	26.8	+1.1
Labour hold		Swing	-13.5	

Langtree
Party	Candidate	Votes	%	±%
Alliance	P. Davies	1,852	50.9	+4.2
Labour	T. Morris	1,074	29.5	−0.6
Conservative	M. Clark	715	19.6	−3.6
Majority		778	21.4	+4.8
Turnout		3,641	36.0	−13.8
Alliance hold		Swing	+2.4	

Leigh Central
Party	Candidate	Votes	%	±%
Labour	P. Smith	2,002	72.4	−0.4
Conservative	S. Emerton	389	14.1	−8.2
Alliance	B. Miners	375	13.6	+13.6
Majority		1,613	58.3	+7.8
Turnout		2,766	30.9	−4.3
Labour hold		Swing	+4.3	

Leigh East
Party	Candidate	Votes	%	±%
Labour	T. Harper	1,694	61.7	+6.1
Alliance	P. Knowles	1,053	38.3	+38.3
Majority		641	23.3	+12.3
Turnout		2,747	27.6	−8.6
Labour hold		Swing	-16.1	

Lightshaw
Party	Candidate	Votes	%	±%
Labour	T. Sherratt	1,988	53.4	−13.3
Conservative	A. Taylor	915	24.6	−8.7
Alliance	J. Marsden	822	22.1	+22.1
Majority		1,073	28.8	−4.6
Turnout		3,725	37.4	−12.5
Labour hold		Swing	-2.3	

Newtown
Party	Candidate	Votes	%	±%
Labour	J. Bridge	1,717	65.5	−12.4
Alliance	N. Brenson	535	20.4	+20.4
Conservative	S. Warren	368	14.0	−8.0
Majority		1,182	45.1	−10.7
Turnout		2,620	28.4	+0.8
Labour hold		Swing	-16.4	

Norley
Party	Candidate	Votes	%	±%
Labour	N. Turner	1,961	79.9	−1.7
Alliance	B. Woolley	320	13.0	+4.8
Conservative	T. Simms	174	7.1	−3.1
Majority		1,641	66.8	−4.5
Turnout		2,455	28.8	−2.7
Labour hold		Swing	-3.2	

Orrell
Party	Candidate	Votes	%	±%
Conservative	J. Hitchen	1,522	40.1	+1.6
Labour	W. Cowley	1,289	34.0	−1.6
Alliance	W. Hudson	983	25.9	+20.7
Majority		233	6.1	+3.3
Turnout		3,794	38.4	−9.3
Conservative hold		Swing	+1.6	

Swinley
Party	Candidate	Votes	%	±%
Conservative	C. Giles	1,710	47.0	−7.5
Labour	C. Cooke	1,080	29.7	+3.8
Alliance	A. Short	850	23.4	+3.7
Majority		630	17.3	−11.2
Turnout		3,640	39.9	+5.2
Labour hold		Swing	-5.6	

Tyldesley East
Party	Candidate	Votes	%	±%
Alliance	G. Pickthall	1,759	51.0	+34.5
Labour	J. Burke	1,692	49.0	−8.8
Majority		67	1.9	−30.1
Turnout		3,451	36.2	−5.1
Alliance gain from Labour		Swing	+21.6	

Whelley
Party	Candidate	Votes	%	±%
Labour	W. Pendleton	1,724	57.0	−17.6
Alliance	G. Derbyshire	931	30.8	+30.8
Conservative	F. Sidebotham	368	12.2	−13.2
Majority		793	26.2	−23.0
Turnout		3,023	33.7	+2.3
Labour hold		Swing	-24.2	

Winstanley
Party	Candidate	Votes	%	±%
Alliance	J. Fitzpatrick	1,418	40.8	+24.9
Labour	E. Naylor	1,081	31.1	−6.3
Conservative	T. Peet	974	28.0	+0.9
Majority		337	9.7	−0.7
Turnout		3,473	33.2	−7.5
Alliance gain from Labour		Swing	+15.6	

Worsley Mesnes
Party	Candidate	Votes	%	±%
Labour	H. Milligan	1,643	63.3	−12.7
Alliance	C. Hughes	565	21.8	+21.8
Conservative	R. Rogers	388	14.9	−9.0
Majority		1,078	41.5	−10.5
Turnout		2,596	26.7	−1.6
Labour hold		Swing	-17.2	
