= 1979 Wigan Metropolitan Borough Council election =

1979 UK local government election

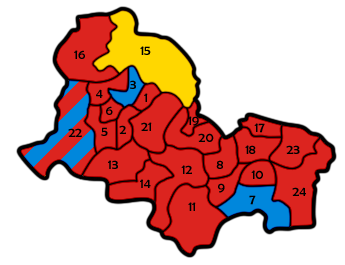
Map of the results for the 1979 Wigan council election. Labour in red, Conservatives in blue and the Liberals in yellow.

Elections to Wigan Council were held on 3 May 1979, with one third of the council up for vote as well as an extra vacancy in Ward 22. The election seen Labour strengthening their grip, with six gains - mostly in the wards they lost seats in at the 1975 election - and one loss. All but one of the gains were from the Conservatives, with the other being from the Liberal's sole seat in Ward 14. A Liberal gain in Ward 15 from Labour kept them represented on the council. Owing to general election on the same day, turnout was significantly up, to 75.7% and all wards were contested - a continuation of the feat started last election.

== Election result ==
Wigan local election result 1979
Party	Seats	Gains	Losses	Net gain/loss	Seats %	Votes %	Votes	+/−
Labour	21	6	1	+5	84.0	55.7	96,617	+1.4%
Conservative	3	0	5	-5	12.0	37.9	65,756	-5.7%
Liberal	1	1	1	0	4.0	5.0	8,646	+3.3%
Residents	0	0	0	0	0.0	1.3	2,328	+1.3%
Communist	0	0	0	0	0.0	0.1	154	-0.1%

This result had the following consequences for the total number of seats on the Council after the elections:

Party	Previous council	New council
Labour	51	56
Conservatives	19	14
Liberals	1	1
Independent	1	1
Total	72	72
Working majority	30	40

== Ward results ==
Ward 1 (Lindsay-Scholes-Whelley)
Party	Candidate	Votes	%	±%
Labour	M. Pratt	4,517	67.2	+4.3
Conservative	C. Giles	2,206	32.8	−4.3
Majority		2,311	34.4	+8.7
Turnout		6,723	74.4	+40.1
Labour hold		Swing	+4.3	

Ward 2 (Poolstock-Worsley Mesnes)
Party	Candidate	Votes	%	±%
Labour	H. Antill	4,643	66.8	0.0
Conservative	R. Rogers	2,311	33.2	0.0
Majority		2,332	33.6	0.0
Turnout		6,954	70.0	+40.8
Labour hold		Swing	0.0	

Ward 3 (Gidlow-Swinley-Whitley)
Party	Candidate	Votes	%	±%
Conservative	W. France	3,989	47.8	−22.7
Labour	K. Green	2,423	29.0	−0.5
Residents	M. McElligott	1,244	14.9	+14.9
Liberal	P. Davies	691	8.3	+8.3
Majority		1,566	18.8	−22.2
Turnout		11,297	73.9	+39.7
Conservative hold		Swing	-11.1	

Ward 4 (Beech Hill and Marsh Green)
Party	Candidate	Votes	%	±%
Labour	N. Turner	4,869	70.7	+2.2
Conservative	W. Banister	2,016	29.3	−2.2
Majority		2,853	41.4	+4.4
Turnout		6,885	72.7	+43.3
Labour hold		Swing	+2.2	

Ward 5 (Highfield and Lamberhead)
Party	Candidate	Votes	%	±%
Labour	J. Smith	4,886	59.0	+6.6
Conservative	A. Foster	3,395	41.0	−6.6
Majority		1,491	18.0	+13.2
Turnout		8,281	73.3	+47.2
Labour hold		Swing	+6.6	

Ward 6 (Newtown and Rose Hill)
Party	Candidate	Votes	%	±%
Labour	M. Milligan	4,327	70.3	+3.7
Conservative	R. Bell	1,830	29.7	−3.7
Majority		2,497	40.6	+7.5
Turnout		6,157	71.4	+43.7
Labour hold		Swing	+3.7	

Ward 7 (Hope Carr)
Party	Candidate	Votes	%	±%
Conservative	D. Powell	2,960	53.6	−2.6
Labour	H. Smith	2,564	46.4	+2.6
Majority		396	7.2	−5.2
Turnout		5,524	77.5	+34.2
Conservative hold		Swing	-2.6	

Ward 8 (St Pauls and St Peters)
Party	Candidate	Votes	%	±%
Labour	A. Roberts	4,269	67.5	+4.8
Conservative	W. Lackenby	1,902	30.1	−3.6
Communist	H. Kedward	154	2.4	−1.2
Majority		2,367	37.4	+8.5
Turnout		6,325	69.7	+42.5
Labour hold		Swing	+4.2	

Ward 9 (Etherstone and St Marys)
Party	Candidate	Votes	%	±%
Labour	D. Caley	3,760	55.7	+9.1
Conservative	H. Yates	2,989	44.3	−2.3
Majority		771	11.4	+11.4
Turnout		6,749	74.5	+41.4
Labour gain from Conservative		Swing	+5.7	

Ward 10 (Lilford-St Josephs-St Thomas)
Party	Candidate	Votes	%	±%
Labour	J. Jones	3,440	51.3	+8.5
Conservative	M. Wood	3,260	48.7	−8.5
Majority		180	2.7	−11.7
Turnout		6,700	76.0	+35.7
Labour gain from Conservative		Swing	+8.5	

Ward 11 (Golborne St Thomas and Lowton)
Party	Candidate	Votes	%	±%
Labour	B. Strett	4,120	50.2	−7.9
Conservative	T. Thompson	3,131	38.2	−3.7
Liberal	A. Nixon	949	11.6	+11.6
Majority		989	12.1	−4.2
Turnout		8,200	77.7	+37.0
Labour hold		Swing	-2.1	

Ward 12 (Golborne Heath Park and Ashton)
Party	Candidate	Votes	%	±%
Labour	A. Miller	4,540	64.5	−0.4
Conservative	J. Harrison	2,503	35.5	+0.4
Majority		2,037	29.0	−0.8
Turnout		7,043	78.8	+42.1
Labour hold		Swing	-0.4	

Ward 13 (Ashton-in-Makerfield North and West)
Party	Candidate	Votes	%	±%
Labour	R. Lyons	3,755	65.9	+3.1
Conservative	B. Smith	1,941	34.1	−3.1
Majority		1,814	31.8	+6.2
Turnout		5,696	75.4	+39.9
Labour hold		Swing	+3.1	

Ward 14 (Ashton-in-Makerfield Central and East)
Party	Candidate	Votes	%	±%
Labour	R. McEntegart	3,815	55.1	−1.6
Conservative	S. Hibbert	3,110	44.9	+1.6
Majority		705	10.2	−3.2
Turnout		6,925	75.0	+42.5
Labour gain from Liberal		Swing	-1.6	

Ward 15 (Standish with Langtree and Shevington)
Party	Candidate	Votes	%	±%
Liberal	J. Pigott	4,043	40.7	+18.9
Labour	J. Hardy	3,327	33.5	−6.2
Conservative	E. Howard	2,555	25.7	−12.6
Majority		716	7.2	+5.8
Turnout		9,925	80.7	+38.5
Liberal gain from Labour		Swing	+12.5	

Ward 16 (Aspull)
Party	Candidate	Votes	%	±%
Labour	A. Singer	3,860	47.8	+1.8
Conservative	J. Blackledge	3,122	38.7	−9.3
Liberal	E. Hill	1,093	13.5	+7.5
Majority		738	9.1	+7.1
Turnout		8,075	80.5	+38.8
Labour hold		Swing	+5.5	

Ward 17 (Atherton North East)
Party	Candidate	Votes	%	±%
Labour	W. Murphy	4,712	65.9	−6.2
Conservative	M. Sharland	2,434	34.1	+6.2
Majority		2,278	31.8	−12.4
Turnout		7,146	73.5	+39.4
Labour hold		Swing	-6.2	

Ward 18 (Atherton South West)
Party	Candidate	Votes	%	±%
Labour	J. Sumner	2,891	56.3	+8.8
Conservative	W. Perrin	2,246	43.7	−8.8
Majority		645	12.5	+7.5
Turnout		5,137	77.8	+35.7
Labour gain from Conservative		Swing	+8.8	

Ward 19 (Hindley Central and North)
Party	Candidate	Votes	%	±%
Labour	A. Robinson	3,826	68.2	−0.3
Conservative	M. Lunt	1,457	26.0	−5.5
Liberal	P. Gibbons	328	5.8	+5.8
Majority		2,369	42.2	+5.2
Turnout		5,611	75.8	+44.9
Labour hold		Swing	+2.6	

Ward 20 (Hindley South East and West)
Party	Candidate	Votes	%	±%
Labour	T. Wynn	5,214	62.2	+6.4
Conservative	J. Culshaw	3,167	37.8	−6.4
Majority		2,047	24.4	+12.8
Turnout		8,381	75.4	+47.1
Labour gain from Conservative		Swing	+6.4	

Ward 21 (Ince-in-Makerfield)
Party	Candidate	Votes	%	±%
Labour	A. Banks	5,627	73.7	+2.0
Conservative	M. Jones	2,008	26.3	−2.0
Majority		3,619	47.4	+3.9
Turnout		7,635	69.5	+37.7
Labour hold		Swing	+2.0	

Ward 22 (Orrell and Billinge)
Party	Candidate	Votes	%	±%
Conservative	F. Fairbarn	4,958	42.1	−13.2
Labour	R. Capstick	4,198	35.6	−9.1
Conservative	M. Fox	4,040		
Labour	E. Nickeas	3,567		
Liberal	J. Fitzpatrick	1,542	13.1	+13.1
Residents	C. Hughes	1,084	9.2	+9.2
Majority		760	6.5	−4.1
Turnout		11,782	84.4	+48.7
Conservative hold		Swing		
Labour gain from Conservative		Swing	+2.0	

Ward 23 (Tyldesley - Shakerley)
Party	Candidate	Votes	%	±%
Labour	F. Hampson	3,220	50.8	+2.8
Conservative	H. Davies	3,114	49.2	−2.8
Majority		662	9.5	+5.6
Turnout		6,966	76.6	+39.1
Labour hold		Swing	+2.8	

Ward 24 (Tyldesley - Astley Green and Blackmoor)
Party	Candidate	Votes	%	±%
Labour	F. Hampson	3,220	50.8	+1.8
Conservative	H. Davies	3,114	49.2	−1.8
Majority		106	1.6	−0.3
Turnout		6,334	80.4	+39.0
Labour hold		Swing	+1.8	
