= Peter Smith, Baron Smith of Leigh =

British baron (1945–2021)

The Right Honourable The Lord Smith of Leigh

Member of the House of Lords
- Lord Temporal
- Life peerage 5 August 1999 – 2 August 2021

3rd Executive Leader of Wigan Council
- In office 1991 – 10 May 2018
- Succeeded by: David Molyneux

Councillor for Leigh West on Wigan Metropolitan Borough Council
- In office 1978–2021

Personal details
- Born: Peter Richard Charles Smith; 24 July 1945 Firs Maternity Home, Leigh, Lancashire, England, U.K.
- Died: 2 August 2021 (aged 76)
- Party: Labour
- Education: LSE

Peter Richard Charles Smith, Baron Smith of Leigh (24 July 1945 – 2 August 2021) was a British Labour local politician and life peer.

== Career ==
Peter Smith was educated at Bolton School before going up to LSE where he graduated in politics and economics. Whilst serving as Leader of Wigan Council and undertaking his duties at the House of Lords, he also completed an MSc in Urban Studies at the University of Salford.

Smith had been a member of Wigan Metropolitan Borough Council since 1978 and was chairman of its finance committee from 1982 to 1991; from 1991 to 2018, he served as Leader of the Council. Created a Life Peer on 5 August 1999 as Baron Smith of Leigh, of Wigan in the County of Greater Manchester, since 2005 he has been treasurer of the Rugby League Group and, since 2006, vice-chair of the Parliamentary Labour Party's Departmental Committee for Office of the Deputy Prime Minister. He was the chairman of Local Government Leadership, a body seeking to develop leadership skills in local government.

He was chair of The Association of Greater Manchester Authorities (AGMA) from 2000 to 2021. He chaired the successor Greater Manchester Combined Authority from its creation in 2011 until the appointment of the interim Mayor in 2015.

== Personal life ==
Lord Smith was married to Joy Smith (née Booth) with one daughter, the artist Anna F C Smith.

On 3 August 2021, it was announced that he had died at the age of 76.

== Elections contested ==
=== Wigan Metropolitan Borough Council elections ===
Year	Ward	Party	Votes	% votes	Position	Ref.
1976	Lilford-St Josephs-St Thomas	Labour	1,595	44.0	2nd of 3	
1978	Etherstone and St Marys	Labour	1,386	46.6	Won	
1980	Leigh Central	Labour	2,112	72.7	Elected	
1982	Leigh Central	Labour	2,002	72.4	Won	
1986	Leigh Central	Labour	Unopposed			
1990	Leigh Central	Labour	Unopposed			
1994	Leigh Central	Labour	Unopposed			
1998	Leigh Central	Labour	1,233	80.6	Won	
2002	Leigh Central	Labour	1,298	71.7	Won	
2004	Leigh West	Labour	1,503	59.1	Elected	
2006	Leigh West	Labour	1,377	54.9	Won	
2010	Leigh West	Labour	2,509	46.7	Won	
2014	Leigh West	Labour	2,005	75.3	Won	
2018	Leigh West	Labour	1,308	54.1	Won	

== See also ==
- Metropolitan Borough of Wigan
