= Ince-in-Makerfield Town Hall =

Judicial building in Ince-in-Makerfield, Greater Manchester, England

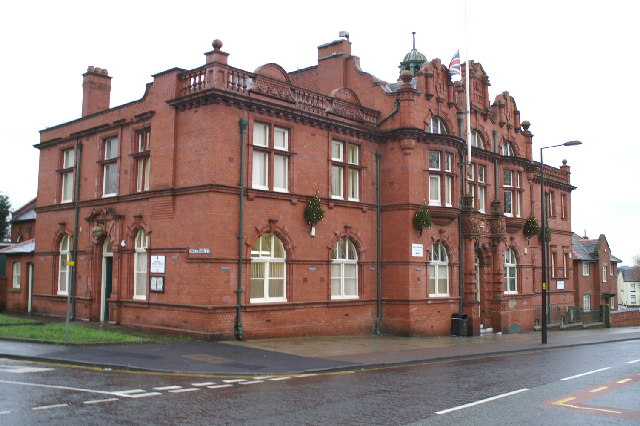
- Ince-in-Makerfield Town Hall

- Shown in Greater Manchester
- 53.5381°N 2.6132°W
- Location: Ince Green Lane, Ince-in-Makerfield

History
- Built: 1903

Site notes
- Architect(s): Heaton, Ralph and Heaton
- Architectural style: Edwardian Baroque style

Ince-in-Makerfield Town Hall, also known as Ince-in-Makerfield Council Offices, is a municipal building in Ince Green Lane, Ince-in-Makerfield, Greater Manchester, England. The building is currently used as a children's nursery.

== History ==
After significant industrial growth in the mid-19th century, largely associated with the coal mining industry, a local board of health was formed in Ince-in-Makerfield in 1866. By the early 1880s, the council had established its offices at No. 43 Ince Green Lane. Ince-in-Makerfield became an urban district in 1894 and, in this context, civic leaders decided to erect new offices further to the southwest along Ince Green Lane. The site chosen was just to the north of Saw Mill Pit which had been sunk in 1869 and where 15 miners died in an explosion in July 1874.

The building was designed by Heaton, Ralph, and Heaton in the Edwardian Baroque style, built in red brick, and was completed in 1903. The design involved an asymmetrical main frontage of eight bays facing onto Ince Green Lane. The central section of three bays, which was slightly projected forward, featured a round-headed doorway with a keystone inscribed with the date of completion. The doorway was flanked by banded Ionic order columns supporting an entablature with elaborate carvings. There was a mullioned and transomed window on the first floor. The outer bays of the central section were fenestrated by round-headed windows on the ground floor and by oriel windows on the first floor. The central section featured an attic floor which was fenestrated by Diocletian windows with carved gables above. The central gable contained a panel that was inscribed with the words "Council Offices" and was flanked by Ionic order colonettes. The left-hand wing of two bays was fenestrated by round-headed windows on the ground floor and by mullioned and transomed windows on the first floor, while the right-hand section of three bays was fenestrated in a similar style, except that the outer bays contained narrow casement windows. At the roof level, there was a balustraded parapet. Internally, the principal room was the council chamber.

The building continued to serve as the office of Ince-in-Makerfield Urban District Council for much of the 20th century but ceased to be the local seat of government when the Wigan Metropolitan Borough Council was formed in 1974. It was subsequently used by Wigan Metropolitan Borough Council for the delivery of local services. The council disposed of the building in 2015 and it was subsequently converted for use as a children's nursery. During the execution of those works, a mural was discovered that depicted the Gulf of Naples and dated back to the construction of the building in the early 20th century.
