= Jimmy Barrington =

English footballer

Personal information
- Full name: James Barrington
- Date of birth: 15 November 1901
- Place of birth: Lower Ince, England
- Height: 5 ft 7 in (1.70 m)
- Position: Full back

Youth career
- Wigan United

Senior career*
Years	Team	Apps	(Gls)
1920–1922	Bradford City	2	(0)
1922–?	Hamilton Academical		
?–1925	Atherton		
1925–1927	Wigan Borough	71	(1)
1927–1929	Winsford United		
1929–1937	Nottingham Forest	211	(1)
1937–1938	Ollerton Colliery		
- * Club domestic league appearances and goals

James Barrington (15 November 1901 – after 1937) was a footballer who played in the Football League for Bradford City, Wigan Borough and Nottingham Forest.

Barrington joined Wigan Borough in 1925, making 71 appearances during his two seasons at the club before being released in 1927.
