= Cathy Bakewell, Baroness Bakewell of Hardington Mandeville =

British politician (born 1949)

The Right Honourable The Baroness Bakewell of Hardington Mandeville MBE
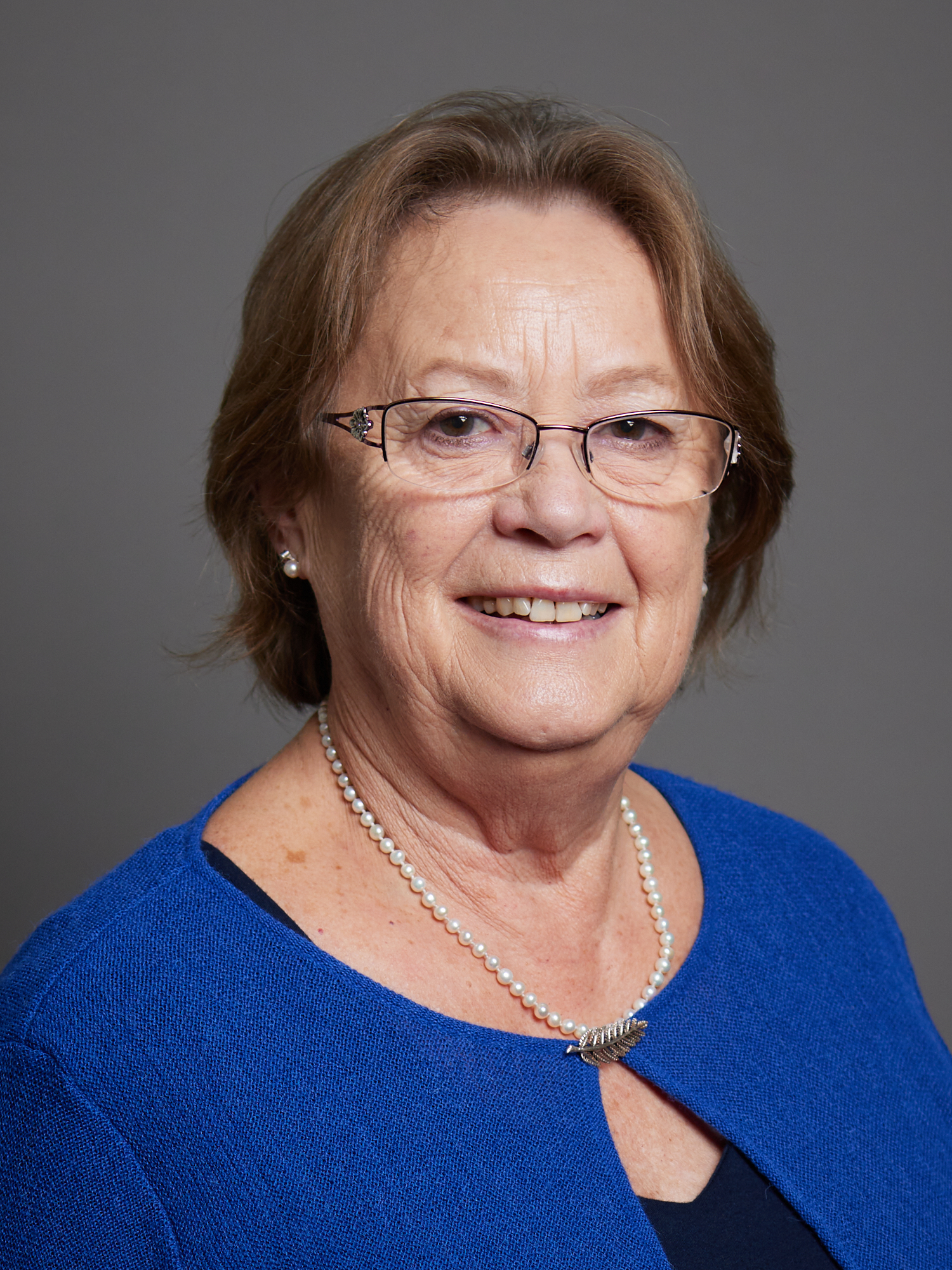
- Official portrait, 2021

Member of the House of Lords
- Lord Temporal
- Life peerage 9 September 2013

Leader of Somerset County Council
- In office 27 June 2001 – 16 May 2007
- Preceded by: Chris Clarke
- Succeeded by: Jill Shortland

Somerset County Councillor for Coker Ward
- In office 6 May 1993 – 2 May 2013

South Somerset District Councillor for Coker Ward
- In office 4 June 2009 – 2 May 2019

Personal details
- Born: Catherine Mary Green; 7 March 1949 (age 77) Bristol, England
- Party: Liberal Democrats
- Occupation: Politician

Catherine Mary Bakewell, Baroness Bakewell of Hardington Mandeville (born 7 March 1949), is a British politician who is a Liberal Democrat member of the House of Lords and formerly a district councillor for the Coker ward of South Somerset.

== Early life and career ==
Bakewell was born Catherine Mary Green in Bristol in 1949. Bakewell joined the Liberal Party in 1974. She became the Yeovil constituency secretary, and went on to become to be an assistant to Yeovil MP Paddy Ashdown. Bakewell worked with Ashdown for twenty years, eventually running the Leader's Office after the 1997 elections.

Bakewell was first elected to Somerset County Council in 1993, serving as Leader from 2001 to 2007, standing down in 2013. Bakewell was a member of the 2007 Councillors Commission which investigated the incentives and barriers to serving on Local Authorities.

Bakewell has served as a Liberal Democrat District Councillor for the Coker electoral ward in South Somerset since 2009.

On 9 September 2013, Bakewell was created a life peer as Baroness Bakewell of Hardington Mandeville, of Hardington Mandeville in the County of Somerset, taking her title for the local village of Hardington Mandeville where she lives. She made her maiden speech in the House of Lords that November during a debate on housing, the speech addressed affordable housing and the impact of the under-occupancy charge. She served as a director for the Leadership Centre for Local Government.
