= Local Government Leadership =

Local Government Leadership is one of the six bodies that form the Local Government Group in England and Wales overseen by the Local Government Association (LGA). Its purpose is to develop leadership skills among both local authority (elected) members and (unelected) officials. It has played a leading role in recent years, including high-profile policy initiatives including 'Total Place' and 'Community Budgets'.

It was formed in 2004 as the Leadership Centre for Local Government (LCLG for short) on the recommendation of the Leadership Development Commission set up by the Society of Local Authority Chief Executives and the Office of the Deputy Prime Minister. In 2008, it acquired charitable status and it was renamed to its current title in July 2010, at the same time as other members of the Local Government Group as part of the latter's 'Getting Closer' initiative.

It is funded by grant funding from UK government departments and fee income from chargeable services. Unlike most other parts of the Local Government Group, it is not one of the bodies specified in law to receive money 'top-sliced' from local authorities' Revenue Support Grant (RSG) payments from the UK government.

The current chairman is Lord Peter Smith.
