= William Lincoln Bakewell =

American sailor and polar explorer (1888–1969)

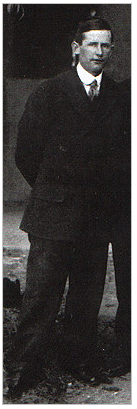
William Lincoln Bakewell circa 1917

William Lincoln Bakewell (November 26, 1888 – May 21, 1969) was the only American aboard the Endurance during the 1914 to 1916 Imperial Trans-Antarctic Expedition with Sir Ernest Shackleton. William Bakewell joined the Endurance crew in Buenos Aires, Argentina along with friend Perce Blackborow. Bakewell was hired on as an Able Seaman. Bakewell's adventures, including his time on board the Endurance, are documented in his own words in his memoir The American on the Endurance.

== Biography ==
Bakewell was born on November 26, 1888, in Joliet, Illinois. From 1914 to 1916 he participated in the Imperial Trans-Antarctic Expedition. In 1923 he returned to Joliet and worked at Elgin, Joliet and Eastern Railway. He next was a towerman for the Rock Island Railroad. He married Merle in 1925 and they had a daughter, Elizabeth Bakewell. During World War II he worked at the Diesel Electric Plant in La Grange, Illinois. In August 1945 he bought a farm in Michigan.

He died on May 21, 1969, in Dukes, Michigan. He was buried in Emanuel Lutheran Church Cemetery in Skandia, Michigan.

== Legacy ==
- Bakewell Island is named in his honor.
