= Robert Bakewell =

Robert Bakewell may refer to:

- Robert Bakewell (agriculturalist) (1725–1795), pioneering English farmer
- Robert Bakewell (ironsmith) (1682–1752), English wrought ironsmith
- Robert Bakewell (geologist) (1767–1843), English geologist
