= Bakewell Island =

Island near Antarctica

- Location within Antarctica

Geography
- Location: Antarctica
- Coordinates: 74°50′S 18°55′W

Administration
- Administered under the Antarctic Treaty System

Demographics
- Population: Uninhabited

Bakewell Island is a small ice-covered island near Princess Astrid Coast and east of Lyddan Island in the south part of the Riiser-Larsen Ice Shelf. The island was discovered November 5, 1967, in the course of a U.S. Navy Squadron VXE-6 flight over the coast in LC-130 aircraft, and was plotted by the United States Geological Survey from air photos taken at that time. It was named by the Advisory Committee on Antarctic Names after William Lincoln Bakewell, the lone American on Ernest Shackleton's ill-fated 1914–16 expedition in the Endurance to this area; Bakewell reportedly represented himself as Canadian to gain acceptance for the voyage to Antarctica.

== See also ==
- List of antarctic and sub-antarctic islands
