= 1975 Wigan Metropolitan Borough Council election =

1975 UK local government election

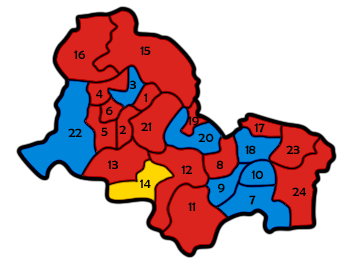
Map of the results for the 1975 Wigan council election. Labour in red, Conservatives in blue and Liberal in yellow.

Elections to Wigan Council were held on 1 May 1975, with one third of the council up for the election - although only 21 seats were contested, as Labour were unopposed in Ward 12, 21 and 24. Labour suffered six losses on the night - five to the Conservatives and one to the Liberals - with a gain from the sole Independent in Ward 23 as consolation. Overall turnout fell by nearly a quarter, to 27%.

== Election result ==
Wigan Council Election Result 1975
Party	Seats	Gains	Losses	Net gain/loss	Seats %	Votes %	Votes	+/−
Labour	16	1	6	-5	66.7	49.2	25,697	-11.3%
Conservative	7	5	0	+5	29.2	40.8	21,270	+12.4%
Liberal	1	1	0	+1	4.2	6.8	3,550	+6.8%
Independent	0	0	1	-1	0.0	2.5	1,302	-5.6%
Communist	0	0	0	0	0.0	0.7	345	+0.5%

This result had the following consequences for the total number of seats on the council after the elections:

Party	Previous council	New council
Labour	66	61
Conservatives	5	10
Liberals	0	1
Independent	1	0
Total	72	72
Working majority	60	50

== Ward results ==
Ward 1 (Lindsay-Scholes-Whelley)
Party	Candidate	Votes	%	±%
Labour	M. Pratt	1,728	64.1	−9.5
Conservative	C. Giles	966	35.9	+9.5
Majority		762	28.2	−19.0
Turnout		2,694	29.0	−9.6
Labour hold		Swing	-9.5	

Ward 2 (Poolstock-Worsley Mesnes)
Party	Candidate	Votes	%	±%
Labour	S. Townley	1,049	65.6	−16.0
Conservative	J. Atherton	550	34.4	+16.0
Majority		499	31.2	−32.0
Turnout		1,599	17.1	−10.4
Labour hold		Swing	-16.0	

Ward 3 (Gidlow-Swinley-Whitley)
Party	Candidate	Votes	%	±%
Conservative	W. France	2,417	64.5	+4.8
Labour	M. Pendleton	862	23.0	−17.3
Liberal	K. Mason	467	12.5	+12.5
Majority		1,555	41.5	+22.1
Turnout		3,746	32.3	−7.1
Conservative hold		Swing	+11.0	

Ward 4 (Beech Hill and Marsh Green)
Party	Candidate	Votes	%	±%
Labour	N. Turner	1,478	71.6	−8.9
Conservative	?. Gormally	586	28.4	+8.9
Majority		892	43.2	−17.8
Turnout		2,064	22.1	−9.4
Labour hold		Swing	-8.9	

Ward 5 (Highfield and Lamberhead)
Party	Candidate	Votes	%	±%
Labour	J. Smith	1,189	51.1	−17.0
Conservative	T. Peet	982	42.2	+10.3
Communist	?. Dowd	157	6.7	+6.7
Majority		207	8.9	−27.2
Turnout		2,328	21.5	−9.1
Labour hold		Swing	-13.6	

Ward 6 (Newtown and Rose Hill)
Party	Candidate	Votes	%	±%
Labour	M. Mulligan	1,116	68.5	−13.1
Conservative	C. Boyle	513	31.5	+13.1
Majority		603	37.0	−26.2
Turnout		1,629	18.6	−6.7
Labour hold		Swing	-13.1	

Ward 7 (Hope Carr)
Party	Candidate	Votes	%	±%
Conservative	?. Hurst	1,535	59.4	+16.0
Labour	J. Jones	1,048	40.6	−16.0
Majority		487	18.9	+5.7
Turnout		2,583	37.5	+0.9
Conservative gain from Labour		Swing	+16.0	

Ward 8 (St Pauls and St Peters)
Party	Candidate	Votes	%	±%
Labour	G. Bridge	817	55.4	−19.1
Conservative	J. Davies	566	38.4	+20.5
Communist	J. Blackburn	91	6.2	−1.4
Majority		251	17.0	−39.6
Turnout		1,474	16.8	−5.0
Labour hold		Swing	-19.8	

Ward 9 (Etherstone and St Marys)
Party	Candidate	Votes	%	±%
Conservative	H. Yates	1,310	54.6	+15.3
Labour	?. Tonks	991	41.3	−19.4
Communist	H. Kedward	97	4.0	+4.0
Majority		319	13.3	−8.2
Turnout		2,398	25.7	−1.3
Conservative gain from Labour		Swing	+17.3	

Ward 10 (Lilford-St Josephs-St Thomas)
Party	Candidate	Votes	%	±%
Conservative	M. Wood	1,853	65.0	+18.2
Labour	J. Prytharch	997	35.0	−18.2
Majority		856	30.0	+23.6
Turnout		2,850	31.3	−4.5
Conservative gain from Labour		Swing	+18.2	

Ward 11 (Golborne St Thomas and Lowton)
Party	Candidate	Votes	%	±%
Labour	E. Roberts	2,095	58.8	−14.9
Conservative	T. Thompson	1,469	41.2	+14.9
Majority		626	17.6	−29.8
Turnout		3,564	34.5	−4.9
Labour hold		Swing	-14.9	

Ward 12 (Golborne Heath Park and Ashton)
Party	Candidate	Votes	%	±%
Labour	A. Miller	Unopposed	N/A	N/A
Labour hold		Swing	N/A	

Ward 13 (Ashton-in-Makerfield North and West)
Party	Candidate	Votes	%	±%
Labour	R. Lyons	1,186	72.4	N/A
Liberal	P. Scully	453	27.6	N/A
Majority		733	44.8	N/A
Turnout		1,639	21.7	N/A
Labour hold		Swing	N/A	

Ward 14 (Ashton-in-Makerfield Central and East)
Party	Candidate	Votes	%	±%
Liberal	?. Worsley	1,103	51.4	+51.4
Labour	G. Fairhurst	1,043	48.6	−21.7
Majority		60	2.8	−37.9
Turnout		2,146	26.6	−1.2
Liberal gain from Labour		Swing	+36.5	

Ward 15 (Standish with Langtree and Shevington)
Party	Candidate	Votes	%	±%
Labour	J. Hardy	1,346	35.7	+2.4
Independent	G. Dewhurst	1,302	34.5	+5.4
Conservative	J. Lawson	754	20.0	+0.0
Liberal	?. Young	369	9.8	+9.8
Majority		44	1.2	−3.0
Turnout		3,771	35.2	−15.7
Labour gain from Independent		Swing	-1.5	

Ward 16 (Aspull)
Party	Candidate	Votes	%	±%
Labour	H. Lowe	1,302	59.2	−5.4
Liberal	?. Lammas	897	40.8	+40.8
Majority		405	18.4	−10.7
Turnout		2,199	22.2	−16.9
Labour hold		Swing	-23.1	

Ward 17 (Atherton North East)
Party	Candidate	Votes	%	±%
Labour	D. Skitt	1,517	54.1	N/A
Conservative	M. Williams	1,025	36.6	N/A
Liberal	?. Hicks	261	9.3	N/A
Majority		492	17.6	N/A
Turnout		2,803	29.8	N/A
Labour hold		Swing	N/A	

Ward 18 (Atherton South West)
Party	Candidate	Votes	%	±%
Conservative	J. Grundy	1,258	64.5	+26.5
Labour	G. Horrabin	693	35.5	−11.3
Majority		565	29.0	+20.3
Turnout		1,951	30.1	−9.7
Conservative gain from Labour		Swing	+18.9	

Ward 19 (Hindley Central and North)
Party	Candidate	Votes	%	±%
Labour	A. Robinson	1,087	64.6	−11.4
Conservative	?. Haseldene	596	35.4	+11.4
Majority		491	29.2	−22.9
Turnout		1,683	22.2	−11.3
Labour hold		Swing	-11.8	

Ward 20 (Hindley South East and West)
Party	Candidate	Votes	%	±%
Conservative	J. Culshaw	1,346	51.7	+15.2
Labour	S. Hardy	1,256	48.3	−15.2
Majority		90	3.5	−23.6
Turnout		2,602	25.5	−3.7
Conservative gain from Labour		Swing	+15.2	

Ward 21 (Ince-in-Makerfield)
Party	Candidate	Votes	%	±%
Labour	A. Banks	Unopposed	N/A	N/A
Labour hold		Swing	N/A	

Ward 22 (Orrell and Billinge)
Party	Candidate	Votes	%	±%
Conservative	F. Fairbairn	2,554	63.3	+29.5
Labour	J. Fitzpatrick	1,482	36.7	−1.4
Majority		1,072	26.6	+22.3
Turnout		4,036	34.8	−9.8
Conservative hold		Swing	+15.4	

Ward 23 (Tyldesley - Shakerley)
Party	Candidate	Votes	%	±%
Labour	A. Wright	1,415	58.8	−12.0
Conservative	?. Hodkinson	990	41.2	+41.2
Majority		425	17.7	−23.9
Turnout		2,405	29.4	+0.8
Labour hold		Swing	-26.6	

Ward 24 (Tyldesley - Astley Green and Blackmoor)
Party	Candidate	Votes	%	±%
Labour	F. Hampson	Unopposed	N/A	N/A
Labour hold		Swing	N/A	
