= Ince-in-Makerfield =

Town in Greater Manchester, England

Coordinates: 53.5402°N 2.5990°W

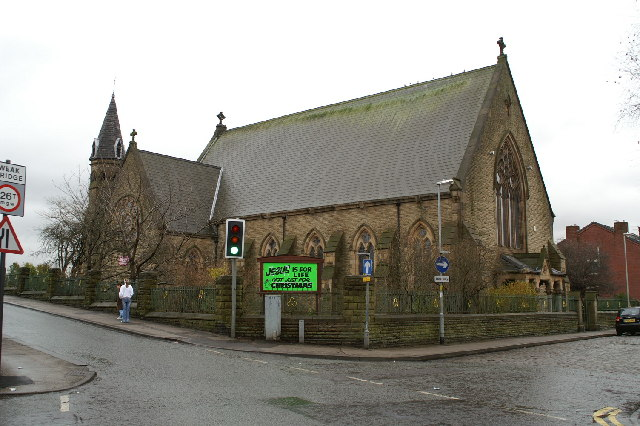
- Christ Church, Ince-in-Makerfield

- Location within Greater Manchester
- Population: 15,664 (2011 Census)
- OS grid reference: SD565005
- Metropolitan borough: Wigan
- Metropolitan county: Greater Manchester
- Region: North West
- Country: England
- Sovereign state: United Kingdom
- Post town: WIGAN
- Postcode district: WN1–WN3
- Dialling code: 01942
- Police: Greater Manchester
- Fire: Greater Manchester
- Ambulance: North West
- UK Parliament: Wigan

Ince-in-Makerfield or Ince is a town in the Metropolitan Borough of Wigan, in Greater Manchester, England. The population of the Ince ward at the 2011 census was 13,486, but a southern part of Ince was also listed under the Abram ward (north of Warrington Road in this ward). Adding on this area brings the total in 2011 to 15,664.

Within the boundaries of the historic county of Lancashire, Ince is contiguous to Wigan and is a residential suburb divided by a railway line into two separate areas, Higher Ince and Lower Ince. From 1894 Ince was an urban district of the administrative county of Lancashire and in 1974 became part of the Metropolitan Borough of Wigan.

== Toponymy ==
The name Ince may be of Cumbric origin and derived from *ïnïs, meaning 'island' or, as is likely in this case, 'dry land' (Welsh ynys).

== History ==
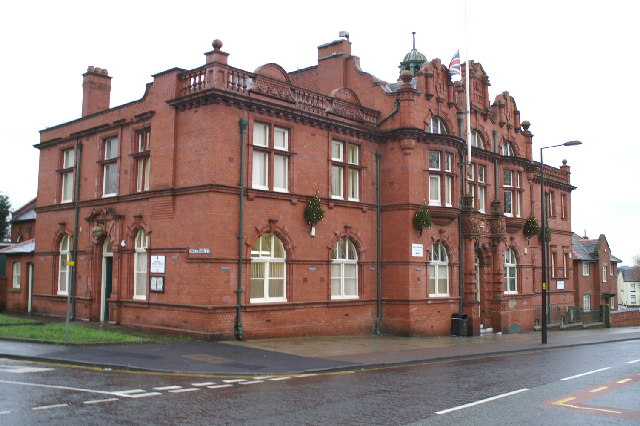
Ince-in-Makerfield Town Hall

The earliest mention of the manor of Ince and the Ince family dates from 1202, at which point it was under the barony of Newton in Makerfield (Newton le Willows). There were four halls in Ince. Both the manor of Ince and the original hall on Warrington Road were held by a family of the same name, who also owned the manor of Aspull and had close ties to the Hindley family. The lineage was replaced by the Gerard family by marriage in the reign of Henry IV, who adopted the name Gerard family of Ince, and the manor remained with them for several centuries until William Gerard sold it to the Earl of Balcarres at some point between 1796 and 1825. It was of timber framed construction. A branch of the Gerard family lived at New Hall from about 1600 until the line died out with marriage to the Andertons of Euxton, who adopted the name Ince Anderton and temporarily inhabited the hall from 1760 to 1818 before moving to Euxton Hall. The third, also known as Ince Hall, was originally a timber and plaster building built in the reign of James I off Manchester Road. It originally had a moat, Italian chimneys and an oak panelled interior but in 1854 was heavily damaged by fire and rebuilt in plain brick of no architectural merit and modernised inside. All three halls were still standing in 1911 but none remain today. Ince-in-Makerfield Town Hall, designed by Heaton Ralph and Heaton, was completed in 1903.

The township covered 2,221 acres. The underlying rocks contained strata of cannel and coal and many collieries were sunk. The early pits were 120 to 900 feet deep, and subsequently to 1,800 feet. Its coal pits included Moss, Ince Hall, Rose Bridge and Ince Collieries. Mining left a legacy of spoil heaps and flashes. Stone was also quarried and used to build bridges on the railway. Ince became heavily industrialised in the Industrial Revolution. The Leeds and Liverpool Canal, the North Union and Liverpool and Bury railways passed through the township and a cotton mill was built.

== Transport ==
Ince is served by Ince railway station on the Manchester to Southport line; however, to distinguish it from Ince & Elton in Cheshire, on destination boards it is displayed as Ince(Manchester).

Ince was once criss-crossed by railway lines on the London and North Western Railway's Warrington to Wigan, Eccles to Wigan, Wigan to St Helens and Springs Branch to Haigh, and Aspull lines, the Lancashire and Yorkshire Railway's Bury to Liverpool line and the Great Central Railway line from Glazebrook to Wigan (on which Lower Ince station was located, between 1884 and 1964), as well as local colliery lines.

The Leeds and Liverpool Canal passes through Higher Ince, and 16 of the Wigan flight of locks are within the township.

== Industry ==
Ince had a railway wagon works until 1980. First opened in the 1870s by Richard & John Olive, it became the Ince Waggon & Iron Works Co. in July 1883. In January 1933 it came under control of the Central Wagon Company, who owned it until closure. As the need for new build wagons diminished in the 1960s, the company continued to repair wagons but also diversified to scrap redundant British Railways rolling stock (wagons and carriages) and steam locomotives. It is recorded that they cut up qty 315 BR steam locomotives from the mid to late 1960s.

== Notable people ==
- Sir William Gerard (1518–1581), an Elizabethan statesman, with a distinguished record of government service in Ireland.
- Thomas Knowles (1824–1883), English businessman and politician, MP for Wigan 1874-1883
- Sir Walter Greaves-Lord (1878–1942), judge and MP for Norwood (in London) from 1922 to 1935.
- Eric Martlew (born 1949), politician and MP for Carlisle from 1987 to 2010.

=== Sport ===
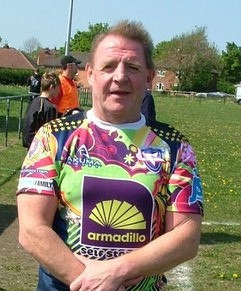
Andy Gregory, 2011

- Joe Peacock (1897–1979), football player who played 232 games including 151 for Everton and 3 for England
- Jimmy Barrington (1901–after 1937), a footballer who played 211 games for Nottingham Forest
- John Ball (1925–1998), footballer, who played 240 games including 200 for Bolton Wanderers
- Parry Gordon (1945–2009), rugby league footballer who played 543 games for Warrington Wolves
- Bill Ashurst (1948–2022), rugby league footballer who played 265 games including 165 for Wigan Warriors
- Andy Gregory (born 1961), rugby league footballer who played 455 games including 131 for Widnes Vikings & 176 for Wigan Warriors
- Martin Crompton (born 1969), former rugby league footballer who played 293 games and 9 for Ireland
- Ian Gildart (born 1969), rugby league footballer who played 255 games including 139 for Wigan Warriors
- Neil Whitworth (born 1972), an English former football defender who played 215 games
- Tommy Makinson (born 1991), rugby league footballer who has played 348 games for St Helens and 10 for England

== See also ==
- Ince (UK Parliament constituency)
- Listed buildings in Ince-in-Makerfield
- St Mary's Church, Lower Ince
- Rose Bridge Academy
- Makerfield
- List of mining disasters in Lancashire
