= Worsley Mesnes =

Coordinates: 53.540°N 2.6310°W

- Location within Greater Manchester
- Population: 11,973 (2011)
- OS grid reference: SD5704
  - London: 176 Miles
- Metropolitan borough: Wigan
- Metropolitan county: Greater Manchester
- Region: North West
- Country: England
- Sovereign state: United Kingdom
- Post town: WIGAN
- Postcode district: WN3
- Dialling code: 01942
- Police: Greater Manchester
- Fire: Greater Manchester
- Ambulance: North West
- UK Parliament: Makerfield

Worsley Mesnes (locally /ˈwɜːrsli ˈmeɪnz/) is a suburb of Wigan in the Metropolitan Borough of Wigan in Greater Manchester, England. The ward population at the 2011 census was 11,974.

== Transport ==
Worsley Mesnes Drive is the main road through the housing estate. In 2015, it was fitted with WRTL Luma LED streetlights to replace the Philips Iridiums fitted in 2006.

== Toponymy ==
Mesnes is from French demesnes, of the manor.
