= List of schools in Wigan =

This is a list of schools in the Metropolitan Borough of Wigan in the English county of Greater Manchester.

== State-funded schools ==
=== Primary schools ===
- All Saints' RC Primary School, Golborne
- Aspull Church Primary School, Aspull
- Atherton St George's CE Primary School, Atherton
- Bedford Hall Methodist Primary School, Leigh
- Beech Hill Community Primary School, Wigan
- Bickershaw CE Primary School, Bickershaw
- Britannia Bridge Primary School, Ince-in-Makerfield
- Bryn St Peter's CE Primary School, Ashton-in-Makerfield
- Canon Sharples CE Primary School, Whelley
- Castle Hill St Philip's CE Primary School, Hindley
- Chowbent Primary School, Atherton
- Christ Church CE Primary School, Pennington
- Garrett Hall Primary School, Tyldesley
- Gilded Hollins Community School, Leigh
- Golborne Community Primary School, Golborne
- Highfield St Matthew's CE Primary School, Pemberton
- Hindley All Saints' CE Primary School, Hindley
- Hindley Green Community Primary School, Hindley Green
- Hindley Junior and Infant School, Hindley
- Hindsford CE Primary School, Atherton
- Holy Family RC Primary School, Boothstown
- Holy Family RC Primary School, Platt Bridge
- Holy Family RC Primary School, Wigan
- Ince CE Primary School, Ince-in-Makerfield
- Leigh Central Primary School, Leigh
- Leigh CE Primary School, Leigh
- Leigh St John's CE Primary School, Leigh
- Leigh St Mary's CE Primary School, Leigh
- Leigh St Peter's CE Primary School, Leigh
- Leigh Westleigh Methodist Primary School, Leigh
- Lowton Junior and Infant School, Lowton
- Lowton St Mary's CE Primary School, Lowton
- Lowton West Primary School, Lowton
- Mab's Cross Primary School, Wigan
- Marsh Green Primary School, Wigan
- Marus Bridge Primary School, Ince-in-Makerfield
- Meadowbank Primary School, Atherton
- Millbrook Primary School, Shevington
- Newton Westpark Primary School, Leigh
- Nicol Mere School, Ashton-in-Makerfield
- Orrell Holgate Academy, Orrell
- Orrell Lamberhead Green Academy, Orrell
- Orrell Newfold Community Primary School, Orrell
- Our Lady's RC Primary School, Aspull
- Parklee Community School, Atherton
- Platt Bridge Community School, Platt Bridge
- RL Hughes Primary School, Ashton-in-Makerfield
- Sacred Heart RC Primary School, Hindley Green
- Sacred Heart RC Primary School, Hindsford
- Sacred Heart RC Primary School, Leigh
- Sacred Heart RC Primary School, Wigan
- St Aidan's RC Primary School, Winstanley
- St Ambrose Barlow RC Primary School, Astley
- St Benedict's RC Primary School, Hindley
- St Bernadette's RC Primary School, Shevington
- St Catherine's RC Primary School, Lowton
- St Catharine's CE Primary School, Scholes
- St Cuthbert's RC Primary School, Pemberton
- St David's Haigh and Aspull CE Primary School, Haigh
- St Gabriel's RC Primary School, Leigh
- St James' CE Primary School, Worsley Mesnes
- St James' RC Primary School, Orrell
- St John's CE Primary School, Abram
- St John's CE Primary School, Hindley Green
- St John's CE Primary School, Mosley Common
- St John's CE Primary School, Pemberton
- St Joseph's RC Primary School, Leigh
- St Jude's RC Primary School, Worsley Mesnes
- St Luke's CE Primary School, Lowton
- St Marie's RC Primary School, Standish
- St Marks' CE Primary School, Newtown
- St Mary and St John RC Primary School, Wigan
- St Mary's CE Primary School, Platt Bridge
- St Michael's CE Primary School, Atherton
- St Oswald's RC Primary School, Ashton-in-Makerfield
- St Patrick's RC Primary School, Wigan
- St Paul's CE Primary School, Pemberton
- St Peter's CE Primary School, Hindley
- St Philip's CE Primary School, Atherton
- St Richard's RC Primary School, Atherton
- St Stephen's CE Primary School, Astley
- St Thomas' CE Junior and Infant School, Golborne
- St Thomas' CE Primary School, Ashton-in-Makerfield
- St Thomas' CE Primary School, Leigh
- St Wilfrid's Catholic Primary School, Ashton-in-Makerfield
- St William's Catholic Primary School, Ince-in-Makerfield
- Shevington Vale Primary School, Appley Bridge
- Standish Lower Ground St Anne's CE Primary School, Wigan
- Standish St Wilfrid's CE Primary Academy, Standish
- Twelve Apostles RC Primary School, Leigh
- Tyldesley Primary School, Tyldesley
- Tyldesley St George's Central CE Primary School, Tyldesley
- Westfield Community School, Pemberton
- Westleigh St Paul's CE Primary School, Leigh
- Wigan St Andrew's CE Junior and Infant School, Wigan
- Wigan Worsley Mesnes Community Primary School, Worsley Mesnes
- Winstanley Community Primary School, Winstanley
- Wood Fold Primary School, Standish
- Woodfield Primary School, Wigan

=== Secondary schools ===
- Atherton High School, Atherton
- Bedford High School, Leigh
- The Byrchall High School, Ashton-in-Makerfield
- Cansfield High School, Ashton-in-Makerfield
- Dean Trust Rose Bridge, Ince-in-Makerfield
- Dean Trust Wigan, Orrell
- The Deanery CE High School, Wigan
- Fred Longworth High School, Tyldesley
- Golborne High School, Golborne
- Hawkley Hall High School, Worsley Mesnes
- Lowton Church of England High School, Lowton
- Outwood Academy Hindley, Hindley
- St Edmund Arrowsmith Catholic High School, Ashton-in-Makerfield
- St John Fisher Catholic High School, Beech-Hill
- St Mary's Catholic High School, Astley
- St Peter's Catholic High School, Orrell
- Shevington High School, Shevington
- Standish Community High School, Standish
- The Westleigh School, Leigh

=== Special and alternative schools ===
- Hope School, Wigan
- Landgate School, Bryn
- Newbridge Learning Community, Platt Bridge
- Oakfield High School and College, Hindley Green
- Rowan Tree Primary School, Atherton
- Three Towers Alternative Provision Academy, Hindley
- Willow Grove Primary School, Ashton-in-Makerfield
- Cewe School, Wigan

=== Further education ===
- St John Rigby College, Orrell
- Wigan and Leigh College, Wigan and Leigh
- Winstanley College, Billinge Higher End
- Aspire College, Leigh Sports Village
- Landgate College, Leigh Sports Village

== Independent schools ==
=== Primary and preparatory schools ===
- Green Meadow Independent Primary School, Lowton

=== Special and alternative schools ===
- Cambian Tyldesley School, Tyldesley
- CEWE School, Scholes
- EdStart Schools Wigan, Pemberton
- Expanse Learning Wigan School, Worsley Mesnes
- The Holden School, Leigh
- The Parks School, Hindley
- Progress Schools Lilford Centre, Tyldesley
- Progress Schools Wigan, Wigan
