= Champion Schools =

Rugby league competition between English schools

- Sport: Rugby league
- Inaugural season: 1981
- Number of teams: 1,678
- Countries: England; Scotland; Wales
- Website: championschools.co.uk

The Champion Schools tournament (known as the Carnegie Champion Schools due to sponsorship) is a full contact knock-out rugby league football competition open to every secondary school in England, Scotland and Wales and is the largest rugby league tournament in the world. The competition is operated by the Rugby Football League (RFL) and the English Schools Rugby League (ESRL). There are competitions for boys and girls in school year groups 7-11 and pupils aged, 11–16.

The competition began in 1981 and was re-launched in 2002, by the RFL in partnership with English Schools Rugby League. The ESRL credit the Champion Schools tournament with having "rejuvenated schools rugby". The RFL believe "this competition has played a vital role in introducing Rugby League to an ever increasing number of young people throughout the United Kingdom". The Champion Schools tournament is the largest knock-out rugby league tournament in the world.

Most of the finals were held at RAF Uxbridge up until 2009, in 2010 and 2011 at Hillingdon sports and athletics complex. Then in 2012, to avoid a clash with the London Olympics, the finals moved north to Odsal Stadium, Bradford and then since 2013, at Richmond athletic stadium (home of London Scottish RFU). The Year 7 boys finalists however have maintained the privilege of playing the curtain raiser at Wembley ahead of the Rugby League Challenge Cup Final. The Year 7 boys finals have also in the past been played at the Millennium Stadium and Twickenham. National finalists from all age groups parade around Wembley in their school uniforms and watch the Challenge Cup Final as guests of the Rugby Football League.

== Rules ==
In the event of a drawn match in a knock-out round before the final, the team that has scored the most tries will be declared the winner. If both teams have scored an equal number of tries the visiting team will progress in the competition. If a final is drawn, the trophy will be shared by both teams with each having it for 6 months.

=== Boys ===
All boys games are played at 13-a-side. Year 7 and 8 competition matches are played with two-halves of 25 minutes duration. Years 9, 10, and 11 play for 30-minute halves.

Size 4 balls are used for year 7 and 8 games. Size 5 balls are used for years 9, 10, and 11.

=== Girls ===
Girls play 9-a-side rugby league. The girls matches at years 7, 8, 9 and 10 are played with 20 minutes for each half. All girls competitions use a size 4 ball. No conversion attempts are made, the games are tries only. Kicking is allowed in general play, for example punts and grubber kicks, but secondary kicking, such as dribbling, is not. Passive scrums consisting of 5 players per team are used. One-on-one tackles are not permitted.

== History ==
The present Champion Schools competitions began in 1981. Before that, Regional Champion School Competitions were held. Many of the Yorkshire Schools' competition records have been lost but the Lancashire Schools' (North West Counties) records go back to the beginning of the Champion School Competition in 1926. St. Patrick's (Wigan) played St. Bede's (Widnes) in that 1926 final at Central Park before a crowd of 20,000. St. Patrick's won 6–3 to become Lancashire's champion school.

In academic year 2006/7 over 1,500 teams and 25,000 players competed. Andy Harland, the RFL's National Development Manager, stated: "Since 2002/2003 season more than 80,000 pupils have played in this tournament, so this year we expect to break the 100,000 barrier which is a huge achievement not only for rugby league but sport in this country".

In 2007, the ESRL fixture secretary, Ron England, noted how the tournament had provided a focus to spreading the sport to more schools. The link to Wembley is cited as one factor in the success of the competition. Another factor highlighted is the enthusiasm of teachers which is considered a driving force. The schools are linked into their local service area and professional clubs. Mr England was positive about the future performance of Welsh and London schools: "They're at a terrific standard". England stated his belief that the best boys' schools teams were playing to a higher standard than in the past, "I think the best individual schools now are at a level that the old district teams were at four or five years ago. Schools have got more ambitious and there's a strong link with the service areas and professional scholarships ... as for the girls, we are seeing the talent emerge and we are now attracting a whole new concept and depth to the development of girls quality competition."

In 2008/09, a 1,678 teams took part in the tournament – an increase of 175 from the previous year. 27,537 students participated. Castleford High School has been a dominant force in the tournament since its re-launch, in 2009 the school fielded 6 teams in the national finals for the third year in succession.

== Format ==
=== Boys ===
Teams play in local competitions before playing regional ones if they qualify, followed by national stages.

=== Girls ===
Teams progress from regional stages to a national festival for which qualifiers are divided into two groups. The groups play round-robin matches with the winners and runners up from each group progressing to the competition semi-finals and then final.

=== Subsidiary competitions ===
Local and regional stages of the competition decide champions titles at those levels, City Champions for Birmingham at each age group, will for example, progress next to the West Midlands Finals stage. Later, the West Midlands champions will meet their East Midlands counterparts before the winners of those encounters move on to the competition's national stage.

==== Wales Schools Cup ====
One of the major subsidiary competitions of the Champion Schools is the Wales Schools Cup. All schools in Wales entering the Champion Schools competition also compete for this Cup during the Wales Schools Finals Day. At each age group, both finalists for the Wales Schools Cup progress to the national stages of the Champion Schools.

The inaugural Wales Schools Cup was held in 2008, the finals were played at Brewery Field in Bridgend.

== 2005/06 National Finals Results ==
Gender	Year	Winners		Score	Runner–up	
Gender	Year	School	Location	Score	School	Location
Boys	7	Wade Deacon	Widnes, Cheshire	20–4	Abraham Guest	Orrell, Wigan, Lancashire
Boys	8	Castleford High	Castleford, West Yorkshire	16–14	Brynteg	Bridgend, Glamorgan
Boys	9	St John Fisher	Wigan, Lancashire	26–10	St Wilfrid's	Featherstone, West Yorkshire
Boys	10	Malet Lambert	Kingston upon Hull, East Yorkshire	20–10	Outwood Grange	Outwood, Wakefield, West Yorkshire
Boys	11	St Peter's	Wigan, Lancashire	30–14	Airedale High	Castleford, West Yorkshire
Girls	7	Castleford High	Castleford, West Yorkshire	48–8	South Craven	Cross Hills, Keighley, North Yorkshire
Girls	8	Holy Family	Keighley, West Yorkshire	16–12	St John Fisher	Wigan, Lancashire
Girls	9	Cardinal Newman	Warrington, Cheshire	24–12	All Saints	Huddersfield, West Yorkshire
Girls	10	N/A	N/A		N/A	N/A
Girls	11	N/A	N/A		N/A	N/A

== 2006/07 National Finals Results ==
Gender	Year	Winners		Score	Runner–up	
Gender	Year	School	Location	Score	School	Location
Boys	7	Normanton Freeston	Normanton, West Yorkshire	12–10	Castleford High	Castleford, West Yorkshire
Boys	8	Castleford High	Castleford, West Yorkshire	22–6	Wade Deacon	Widnes, Cheshire
Boys	9	Airedale High	Castleford, West Yorkshire	26–12	Castleford High	Castleford, West Yorkshire
Boys	10	St John Fisher	Wigan, Lancashire	19–18	Great Sankey	Warrington, Cheshire
Boys	11	Whitehaven School	Whitehaven, Cumbria	24–22	Malet Lambert	Kingston upon Hull, East Yorkshire
Girls	7	Castleford High	Castleford, West Yorkshire	24–4	Lowton High	Lowton, Lancashire
Girls	8	Castleford High	Castleford, West Yorkshire	4–0	Cardinal Newman	Warrington, Cheshire
Girls	9	Castleford High	Castleford, West Yorkshire	8–8 Shared trophy	Holy Family	Keighley, West Yorkshire
Girls	10	Cardinal Newman	Warrington, Cheshire	20–16	All Saints	Huddersfield, West Yorkshire
Girls	11	N/A	N/A		N/A	N/A

== 2007/08 National Finals Results ==
Gender	Year	Winners		Score	Runner–up	
Gender	Year	School	Location	Score	School	Location
Boys	7	Standish	Standish, Lancashire	58–8	Pickering	Kingston upon Hull, East Yorkshire
Boys	8	Freeston	Normanton, West Yorkshire	18–10	Castleford High	Castleford, West Yorkshire
Boys	9	Castleford High	Castleford, West Yorkshire	24–4	Wade Deacon	Widnes, Cheshire
Boys	10	Airedale High	Castleford, West Yorkshire	28–10	Great Sankey	Warrington, Cheshire
Boys	11	Great Sankey	Warrington, Cheshire	16–14	St Wilfrid's	Featherstone, West Yorkshire
Girls	7	Castleford High	Castleford, West Yorkshire	12–12 Shared trophy	Holy Cross	Chorley, Lancashire
Girls	8	Castleford High	Castleford, West Yorkshire	28–4	Lowton High	Lowton, Lancashire
Girls	9	North Halifax	Halifax, West Yorkshire	16–12	Castleford High	Castleford, West Yorkshire
Girls	10	Castleford High	Castleford, West Yorkshire	20–4	St John Fisher	Wigan, Lancashire
Girls	11	Cardinal Newman	Warrington, Cheshire	28–12	All Saints	Huddersfield, West Yorkshire

== 2008/09 National Finals Results ==
Gender	Year	Winners		Score	Runner–up	
Gender	Year	School	Location	Score	School	Location
Boys	7	Outwood Grange	Outwood, Wakefield, West Yorkshire	20–12	Castleford High	Castleford, West Yorkshire
Boys	8	Brooksbank	Elland, Calderdale, West Yorkshire	32–14	Standish	Standish, Wigan, Lancashire
Boys	9	Freeston	Normanton, West Yorkshire	32–12	Castleford High	Castleford, West Yorkshire
Boys	10	Castleford High	Castleford, West Yorkshire	20–6	Wade Deacon	Widnes, Cheshire
Boys	11	Airedale	Castleford, West Yorkshire	30–16	Great Sankey	Warrington, Cheshire
Girls	7	Hollingworth High	Rochdale, Greater Manchester	36–0	De La Salle	St Helens, Merseyside, Lancashire
Girls	8	Settle Middle	Settle, North Yorkshire	20–12	Holy Cross	Chorley, Lancashire
Girls	9	Castleford High	Castleford, West Yorkshire	20–4	Wade Deacon	Widnes, Cheshire
Girls	10	Castleford High	Castleford, West Yorkshire	16–8	Settle College	Settle, North Yorkshire
Girls	11	Castleford High	Castleford, West Yorkshire	20–12	Deanery High	Wigan, Lancashire

== 2009/10 National Finals Results ==
Gender	Year	Winners		Score	Runner–up	
Gender	Year	School	Location	Score	School	Location
Boys	7	Dowdales School	Barrow, Cumbria	24–6	Temple Moor	Leeds, West Yorkshire
Boys	8	Outwood Grange	Wakefield, West Yorkshire	38–8	Brentwood County High	Brentwood, Essex
Boys	9	Brooksbank	Calderdale, West Yorkshire	32–24	St Benedict's	Whitehaven, Cumbria
Boys	10	Castleford High	Castleford, West Yorkshire	32–6	St Peter's and St Paul's	Halton, Cheshire
Boys	11					
Girls	7	Castleford High	Castleford, West Yorkshire	46–10	Settle Middle School	Settle, North Yorkshire
Girls	8	Castleford High	Castleford, West Yorkshire	64–4	Feltham	London
Girls	9	Castleford High	Castleford, West Yorkshire	38–6	Holy Cross	Lancashire
Girls	10	Castleford High	Castleford, West Yorkshire	24–18	Settle High	Settle, North Yorkshire
Girls	11					

== 2012/13 National Finals Results ==
Gender	Year	Winners		Score	Runner–up	
Gender	Year	School	Location	Score	School	Location
Boys	7	Royal Grammar School, High Wycombe	High Wycombe, Buckinghamshire	44–4	Castleford High	Castleford, West Yorkshire
Boys	8	Honley High School	Holmfirth, West Yorkshire	24–6	St Cuthberts	
Boys	9	St Edmund Arrowsmith	Wigan, Greater Manchester	24–22	St Peter and Paul	Widnes, Cheshire
Boys	10	Dowdales	Barrow, Cumbria	34–10	Bruntcliffe	Leeds, West Yorkshire
Girls	7	St Peters		32–18	Sirius Academy	Hull, East Riding
Girls	8	Deanery High School	Wigan, Greater Manchester	30–12	Ossett Academy	Ossett, West Yorkshire
Girls	9	Leigh Academy	Kent	30–6	Outwood Grange Academy	Outwood, West Yorkshire
Girls	10	Castleford High	Castleford, West Yorkshire	24–18	Abraham Guest Academy	

== New Champion Colleges competition ==
The successful growth of the Champion Schools tournament has led to the creation of the Carnegie Champion Colleges competition for Years 12 and 13. The regionally based competition was introduced in 2008 and started in January.

== See also ==
- Champion Colleges competition
- Junior rugby league in England
- Rugby league in England
- Rugby league in Scotland
- Rugby league in Wales
