= Byrchall High School =

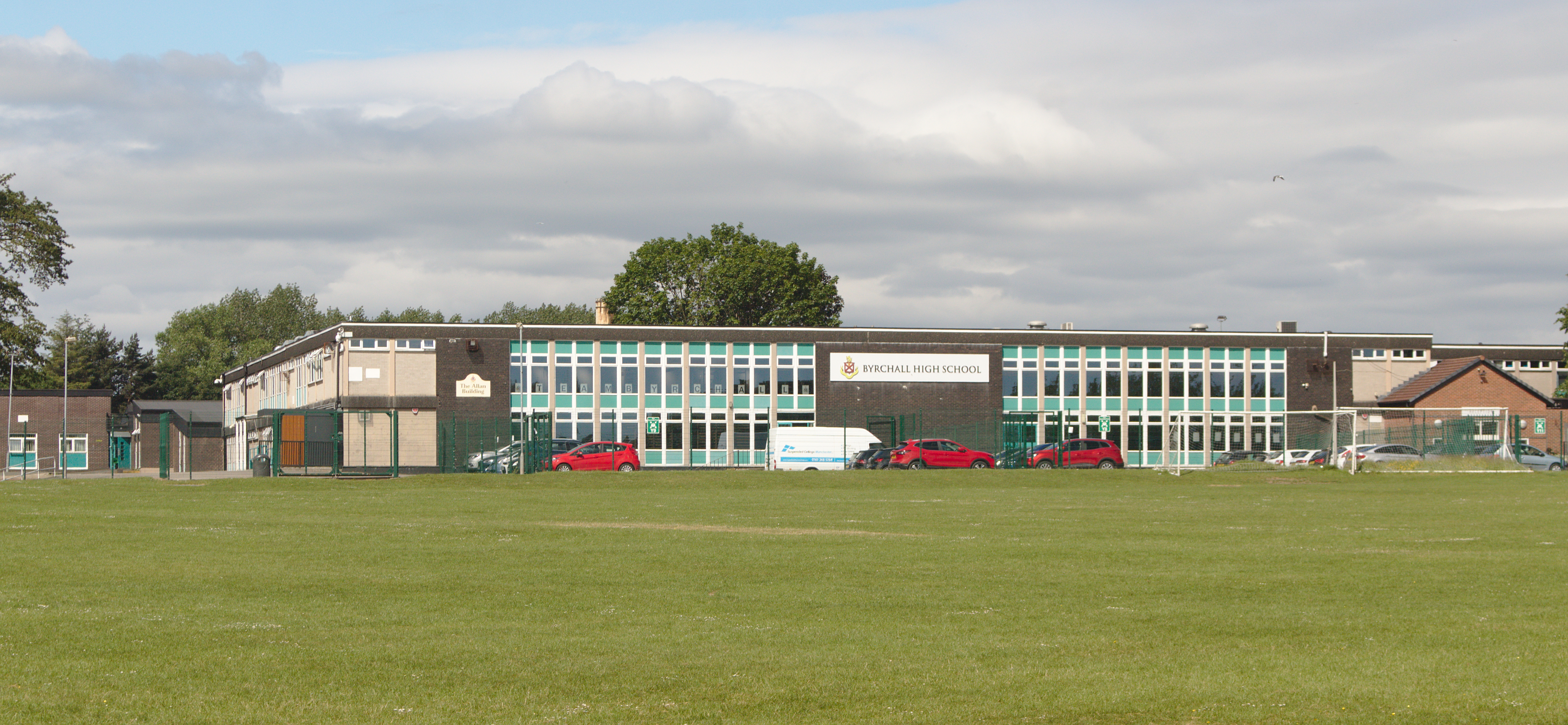

Location
- Warrington Road; Ashton-in-Makerfield, Greater Manchester, WN4 9PQ; England; 53.4813°N 2.6409°W

Information
- Type: Academy
- Motto: LIVE TO LEARN, LEARN TO LIVE!!
- Established: 1588; 438 years ago
- Local authority: Wigan
- Specialist: Mathematics and English
- Department for Education URN: 138699 Tables
- Ofsted: Reports
- Head teacher: Phil Paul
- Gender: Mixed
- Age: 11 to 16
- Enrolment: 1131
- Former name: Ashton-in-Makerfield Grammar School
- Website: https://www.byrchall.wigan.sch.uk

Byrchall High School is a secondary school and specialist mathematics and English school with academy status, in Ashton-in-Makerfield within the Metropolitan Borough of Wigan, Greater Manchester.

== Admissions ==
It has a mixed intake of both boys and girls aged 11–16. The current pupil population is approximately 1,200. The current headteacher is Phil Paul. Byrchall High School is one of three secondary schools in Ashton, the other two being St Edmund Arrowsmith Catholic High School, next to Byrchall High School, and Cansfield High School.

The school is situated between the A49 and the M6 on the southern edge of the Wigan borough, neighbouring Haydock in the borough of St Helens.

== History ==
=== Grammar school ===
The school was founded in 1588 as Ashton Grammar School by Robert Byrchall on land donated by wealthy local land owner William Gerard. The original building in Seneley Green is now Garswood Library. Through the school, Ashton-in-Makerfield Grammar School Old Boys F.C. (now known as Ashtonians AFC) entered the Lancashire Amateur Football League in 1951.

After the Second World War a prisoner-of-war camp for Germans, POW Camp 50, operated at its site. One of its inmates was footballer Bert Trautmann who was confined there until 1948.

In 1960, Lancashire Education Committee proposed to amalgamate the school with Upholland Grammar School when the school had around 450 pupils. The school was administered by Wigan Metropolitan Borough Council from April 1974. By 1973 the school had 700 pupils and 800 by 1975.

=== Comprehensive ===
It became a comprehensive school in 1978.

=== Academy ===
The school became an academy on 1 October 2012.

== Alumni ==
=== Seneley Green Grammar School ===
- Saint Edmund Bryan Arrowsmith, (1585 – 28 August 1628)

=== Ashton-in-Makerfield Grammar School ===
- Sir George Bishop CB OBE, Chairman from 1972-79 of Booker-McConnell, President from 1957-58 of the International Sugar Council, President from 1983-87 of the Royal Geographical Society
- Prof Rodney Robert Porter FRS, biochemist, won the 1972 Nobel Prize in Physiology or Medicine for discovering the structure of antibodies, Whitley Professor of Biochemistry from 1967-85 at the University of Oxford
- Sir John Randall FRS, physicist who invented the cavity magnetron, currently found in microwave ovens

=== Byrchall High School ===
- Jane Bruton, Chairman in 2007 of the British Society of Magazine Editors, and Editor from 2005-15 of Grazia and from 2001-01 of Eve
- Lewis Hancox, graphic novelist, social media personality and filmmaker
- Lemn Sissay, writer and broadcaster
- Kym Marsh, actress, presenter and singer
