= St Wilfrid's Catholic High School =

St Wilfrid's Catholic High School may refer to:

- St Wilfrid's Catholic School, Crawley
- St Wilfrids Catholic High School, North Featherstone
