= Ashton-in-Makerfield Town Hall =

Municipal building in Ashton-in-Makerfield, Greater Manchester, England

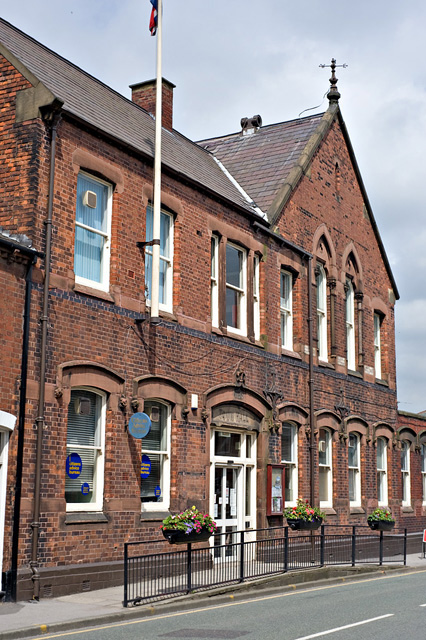
- The building in 2008

- Shown in Greater Manchester
- 53.4873°N 2.6393°W
- Location: Bryn Street, Ashton-in-Makerfield

History
- Built: 1876
- Demolished: 2017

Site notes
- Architect: Henry Ridsdale
- Architectural style: Victorian style

Ashton-in-Makerfield Town Hall, formerly Ashton-in-Makerfield Urban District Council Offices, was a municipal building in Bryn Street, Ashton-in-Makerfield, a town in Greater Manchester, England. The building, which served as the offices and meeting place of Ashton-in-Makerfield Urban District Council, was demolished in 2017.

== History ==
Following significant population growth, largely associated with the mining industry, a local board of health was established in Ashton-in-Makerfield in 1872. The board immediately set about commissioning a municipal building for the town: the site they selected was on the west side of Bryn Street. The new building was designed by Henry Ridsdale of Rainhill in the Victorian style, built in red brick at a cost of £2,800 and was completed in 1876.

The design involved an asymmetrical main frontage of seven bays facing onto Bryn Street. The third bay on the left featured a squared headed doorway surmounted by a stone carved with the words "Town Hall" and a segmental shaped hood mould. There was a tripartite window on the first floor. The other two bays in the left hand section were fenestrated by sash windows with segmental shaped hood moulds on the ground floor and by sash windows with entablatures on the first floor. The right-hand section of four bays, which was gabled, was fenestrated by sash windows with segmental shaped hood moulds on the ground floor, and by a pair of arched windows with architraves flanked, on either side, by sash windows on the first floor. The gable was surmounted by a weather vane. Internally, the principal rooms were a public hall, a council chamber and various offices.

Four commemorative stones recording extracts from the stock ledgers of local charities, The Ashton Linen Stock Charity, The Ashton Woollen (or 'Coat') Stock Charity and The Ashton Breeches Stock Charity, were recovered from the old St Thomas' Church when it was demolished in 1890, and installed on the staircase in the building. In 1894, the local board of health was succeeded by Ashton-in-Makerfield Urban District Council, which also used the building as its headquarters.

The building continued to serve as the headquarters of the district council for much of the 20th century, but ceased to be the local seat of government when the enlarged Wigan Metropolitan Borough Council was formed in 1974. The new council continued to use the building for the delivery of local services until it was deemed surplus to requirements and marketed for sale. It was then sold it to a developer, Eric Wright Health and Care, in October 2015. In January 2017, the developer started demolition of the building, replacing it with a new health facility, which opened in 2019.
