= Listed buildings in Ashton-in-Makerfield =

Ashton-in-Makerfield is a town in the Metropolitan Borough of Wigan, Greater Manchester, England. It contains ten listed buildings that are recorded in the National Heritage List for England. All the listed buildings are designated at Grade II, the lowest of the three grades, which is applied to "buildings of national importance and special interest". Industry, including coal mining, came to the town in the 19th century, but it is now mainly residential. The older listed buildings consist of farmhouses, a farm building, a chapel and a milestone, and the later ones are churches and associated structures, and a library.

== Buildings ==
Name and location	Photograph	Date	Notes
Home Farmhouse; 53.48733°N 2.65115°W	—	c. 1692	The farmhouse was altered in the 19th century. It is in brick, roughcast at the front and sides, with a sill band and a slate roof. There are two storeys, three bays, and single-storey extensions on the sides. On the front is an open-framed porch with a hipped roof, and the doorway has an elliptical head. This flanked by canted bay windows with hipped roofs, and on the upper floor are sash windows with segmental heads. At the rear the windows are casements.
Park Lane Unitarian and Free Christian Chapel; 53.50984°N 2.65169°W		1697	Originally a Presbyterian chapel, it was altered in 1826 and 1871–72 and extended in 1903–04. It is in pebbledashed brick on a stone plinth, with stone dressings, a top corbelled frieze and a slate roof. There are five bays, the western bay with two storeys and two gables. At the east end is a coped gable with a ball finial, at the west end is square bellcote with a pyramidal shingled roof, and on the south side are three urns on a plinth.
Old Mill Farmhouse and Barn; 53.49694°N 2.66237°W	—	Late 18th century	The farmhouse and barn are in brick with stone-slate roofs, and the house is pebbledashed. The house has two storeys and two bays. On the ground floor is a canted bay window to the left, a 20th-century casement window to the right, and sash windows on the upper floor; the windows have keystones. The barn on the left has three bays and a rear extension, and contains a cart entrance and doors.
Milestone; 53.49531°N 2.64358°W	—	Late 18th or early 19th century (possible)	The milestone is in stone and is curved with an arris at the front and chamfered at the top. It is inscribed with the distances in yards to the centre of the town, and in miles to Wigan, Warrington and Bryn railway station.
St Oswald's Presbytery; 53.48523°N 2.64052°W	—	1822	The presbytery is in brick with stone dressings, a top cornice, a blocking course, and a slate roof. There are two storeys, three bays, and a single-storey extension to the west. The doorway has an inset Tuscan doorcase, an elliptical-headed entrance, and a fanlight. The windows are sashes with wedge lintels, and there is a flat-roofed dormer.
Gates and gate piers, St Oswald's Church; 53.48610°N 2.64127°W	—	c. 1822	The gates are at the entrance to the churchyard. The gates and gate piers are in cast iron. The piers are square and have open scrollwork sides, cornices, and pine-cone finials. The gates have decorative bands and spear finials.
Railings, 60 Bolton Road; 53.48963°N 2.63393°W	—	c. 1830	The railings stretch for about 22 metres (72 ft) along the front of the garden. They are in cast iron and are ornamental with interlacing.
St Thomas' Church; 53.48565°N 2.63887°W		1891–93	A vestry was added to the church by Austin and Paley in 1928. The church is in sandstone with a concrete tile roof, and consists of a nave with a clerestory, north and south aisles, a chancel with a north organ loft and vestries at the east and south, and a west tower. The tower has buttresses, north and south doorways, a four-light west window with Perpendicular tracery, a northwest square stair turret, clock faces on three sides, a cornice, and an embattled parapet with a gargoyle on the east.
Carnegie Library; 53.48884°N 2.63887°W		1905–06	The library was built with a grant from Andrew Carnegie. It is in red brick with sandstone dressings, a slate roof, and has the plan of an irregular polygon. The entrance front has two storeys, with steps leading up to a doorway with a segmental arch, a fanlight, a keystone, and a hood mould on corbels. Above is a Venetian window with a datestone, and at the top is a gable flanked by corner turrets with lead roofs and flagpoles. Along the sides are round-headed windows and inscribed parapets. On the top of the building is a lantern with a cupola.
Church of St Oswald and St Edmund Arrowsmith; 53.48525°N 2.64102°W		1925–30	A stone Roman Catholic church in Romanesque style. It consists of a nave with a clerestory, and a chancel with an apse and an ambulatory, along the sides of which are chapels and confessionals. At the southwest is a tower, at the northwest is a turret, and on the nave are two saucer domes. The west front has a large arched entrance and a corbel table. In the tympanum of the arch is a carving of the Coronation of the Virgin, and on the corbel table is a statue of St Oswald. The church contains the shrine of St Edmund Arrowsmith, an English martyr.
