= Lancaster Martyrs =

Catholic martyrs in Reformation England

During the English Reformation, a number of believers were executed at Lancaster in England as a consequence of their Catholic faith. They are commonly referred to as the Lancaster Martyrs and are commemorated locally by the Lancaster Martyrs Memorial Stone which may be found close to the centre of Lancaster city.

Law at the time, such as the Jesuits, etc. Act 1584, made it treason to be a Catholic priest in England and therefore Catholic priests were typically hanged, drawn and quartered. Laymen convicted of assisting priests were usually sentenced to the lesser punishment of execution by hanging.

== List of the Lancaster Martyrs ==
The Lancaster Martyrs include the following individuals:

- Edmund Arrowsmith: A Jesuit priest born in Haydock and executed in Lancaster on 28 August 1628. Declared a saint by the Catholic church.
- Ambrose Barlow: A Benedictine priest born in Manchester and executed in Lancaster on 10 September 1641. Declared a saint by the Catholic church.
- Edward Bamber: A priest born in Poulton-le-Fylde near Blackpool and executed in Lancaster on 7 August 1646. Beatified by the Catholic church.
- James Bell: A priest born in Warrington and executed in Lancaster on 10 April 1584. Beatified by the Catholic church.
- John Finch: A layman born in Eccleston near Preston and executed alongside James Bell in Lancaster on 10 April 1584. Beatified by the Catholic church.
- Richard Hurst: A layman born in Broughton and executed alongside Edmund Arrowsmith in Lancaster on 28 August 1628. Beatified by the Catholic church.
- Thurstan Hunt: A priest born in Rothwell near Leeds in the West Riding of Yorkshire and executed in Lancaster on 3 April 1601. Beatified by the Catholic church.
- Robert Middleton: A Jesuit priest born in York and executed alongside Thurstan Hunt in Lancaster on 3 April 1601. Beatified by the Catholic church.
- Robert Nutter: A Dominican priest born in Burnley and executed in Lancaster on 26 July 1600. Beatified by the Catholic church.
- John Thules: A priest born in Whalley and executed in Lancaster on 18 March 1616. Beatified by the Catholic church.
- Thomas Whittaker: A priest born in Burnley and executed in Lancaster on 7 August 1646. Beatified by the Catholic church.
- John Woodcock: A Fransciscan priest born in Clayton-le-Woods and executed in Lancaster alongside Thomas Whitaker on 7 August 1646. Beatified by the Catholic church.
- Edward Thwing: A priest born in Heworth near York and executed in Lancaster alongside Robert Nutter on 26 July 1600. Beatified by the Catholic church.
- Roger Wrenno: A layman born in Chorley and executed in Lancaster alongside John Thules on 18 March 1646. Beatified by the Catholic church
- Lawrence Bailey (Baily): A layman executed in Lancaster on 18 March 1604.

The last Abbot of Whalley Abbey, John Paslew and the last Abbot of Sawley Abbey, William Trafford along with a monk by the name of Richard Estegate are also believed to have been executed at Lancaster on 10 March 1537 after being tried for complicity in the Pilgrimage of Grace, although there are some claims that Paslew was taken back to Whalley for execution. Whilst there is a tradition of considering them among Catholic martyrs of the English reformation, they are not formally listed among those martyrs that have had their cause advanced through the canonisation process of the Catholic church.

== Lancaster Martyrs' Memorial Stone ==
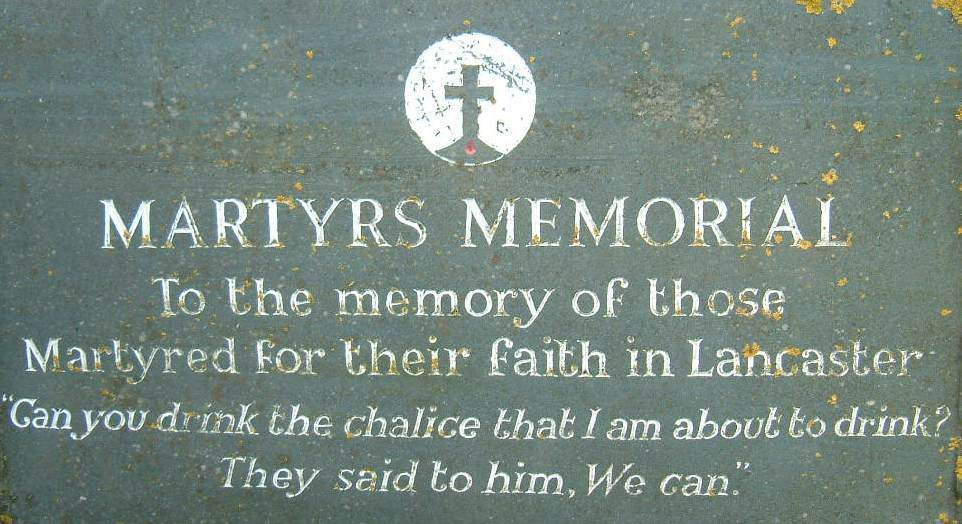
Inscription on the Lancaster Martyrs' Memorial Stone

The executions were not carried out on the same spot and their precise sites on Far Moor, to the East of the city, were never formally recorded in order to avoid any future veneration of martyrs by Catholics. However, a memorial standing in the approximate vicinity of at least some of the executions was eventually erected in 1996 and blessed in front of a crowd of several hundred people. It is located in what is now recreation ground (opposite Williamson Park and North of Quernmore Road) on a hillside above the Catholic Cathedral of St Peter and St Thomas More, looking out towards the panorama of Morecambe Bay and the mountains of the Lake District.

The Lancaster Martyrs' Memorial Stone is dedicated "to the memory of those Martyred for their faith in Lancaster". It includes a quotation from the Gospel of Matthew (20:22): "Can you drink the Chalice that I am about to drink? They said to Him, we can."

== Canonisation and Beatification of the Martyrs ==
Numerous men and women killed during the reformation period have been officially recognised as martyrs of the English reformation by the Catholic Church.

Two of the Lancaster Martyrs, Edmund Arrowsmith and Ambrose Barlow, were among the Forty Martyrs of England and Wales canonised by Pope Paul VI as saints on 25 October 1970.

James Bell, John Finch, and Richard Hurst were among one hundred and thirty seven martyrs of England and Wales beatified by Pope Pius XI on 15 December 1929.

Edward Bamber, John Thules, Robert Nutter, Thurstan Hunt, Robert Middleton, Thomas Whitaker, John Woodcock, Edward Thwing and Roger Wrenno were among eight five martyrs of England and Wales beatified by Pope John Paul II on 22 November 1987.

Lawrence Bailey has not been canonised as a saint or beatified. However he has been declared as "venerable", a lower status in the canonisation process. Abbot John Paslew, Abbot William Trafford and Richard Estegate have not had their cause advanced to the Holy See.

== Feast of the Lancaster Martyrs ==
The Catholic church marks the feast of the Lancaster Martyrs on 7 August. This feast is usually celebrated in the Catholic Cathedral of Lancaster on that day. A specific collect for the feast day reads:

"Almighty Father, may those who died on the hill above Lancaster, grieving for England which they prayed God soon to convert, be our patrons now in heaven that our lives may witness to the faith they professed. Through Our Lord Jesus Christ, who lvies and reigns with you in unity of the Holy Spirit, one God forever and ever. Amen"

The feast of the Forty Martyrs of England and Wales, which include Edmund Arrowsmith and Ambrose Barlow among their number, is celebrated on 25 October.
