= Garswood =

Coordinates: 53.488°N 2.670°W

- Village
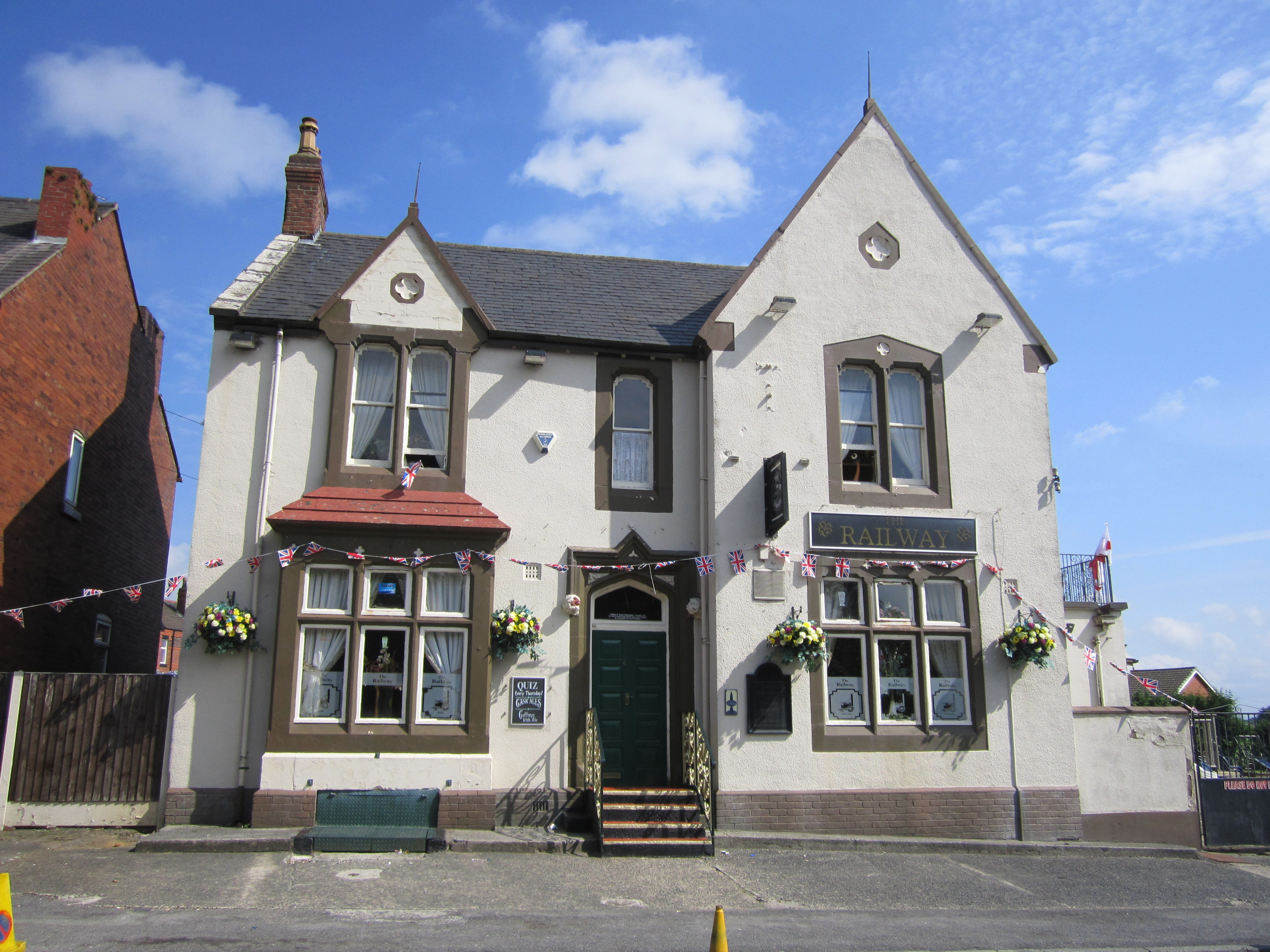
- The Railway public house, Garswood

- Location within Merseyside
- Population: 6,183
- OS grid reference: SJ556993
- Civil parish: Seneley Green
- Metropolitan borough: Metropolitan Borough of St. Helens
- Metropolitan county: Merseyside
- Region: North West
- Country: England
- Sovereign state: United Kingdom
- Post town: WIGAN
- Postcode district: WN4
- Dialling code: 01942; 01744
- Police: Merseyside
- Fire: Merseyside
- Ambulance: North West
- UK Parliament: St Helens North

Garswood is a village in the Metropolitan Borough of St. Helens, Merseyside, England. The village is within the civil parish of Seneley Green. The parish was part of Ashton-in-Makerfield until the 1974 boundary changes.

== History ==
In the historic county of Lancashire, Garswood is from Old English gyr “fir” and wudu "wood", the fir wood. The name was recorded as Gratiswode (undated).

Along with extensive farming, Garswood has seen much coal mining activity in its past, due to strata running up to an adjacent fault causing much outcropping of coal seams. Local mines included Garswood Park (which operated 1868–1880), Seneley Green (1869–1880), Birchenheds (1880–1925) and Park (1869–1960).

Mining has taken place using (comparatively) shallow shafts and many drifts. The last drift mine in the Garswood area (in neighbouring Golborne), Quaker House Colliery, closed in 1992. Extensive opencast mining has taken place in more recent times and still continues in the area.

== Education ==
In 1588 Seneley Green (as it was then known) became the site of Ashton-in-Makerfield Free Grammar School, the area's first free grammar school, founded by Robert Byrchall on land granted for the purpose by Sir Thomas Gerard.

Whilst the original building has long since been demolished, today the site is used as Garswood Public Library, housed in a grade II listed building.

Ashton-in-Makerfield Free Grammar School was attended by Saint Edmund Arrowsmith, one of the Forty Martyrs of England and Wales.

Garswood County Primary School is located in the centre of Garswood and in 2018/19 had 207 pupils on its roll.

== Governance ==
Before 1974 Garswood fell under the administrative control of Ashton-in-Makerfield Urban District. In 1974, under the Local Government Act 1972, the district was abolished, with the area split administratively. The changes resulted in the creation of the Seneley Green Parish, containing Garswood, Pewfall and Downall Green, which now fell within the Metropolitan Borough of St Helens in the newly created Merseyside.

The village is now part of the Billinge and Seneley Green wards of St Helens.

== Sport ==
Garswood United F.C. were formed in 1967 and joined the Mid-Cheshire League in 1988. They won Division Two in 1990 and Division One in 1996.

Garswood Stags ARLFC was founded in 2013. The club is coached by former St Helens RL and Great Britain international Paul Loughlin.

== Transport ==
Garswood railway station provides direct rail links to Liverpool, St. Helens and Wigan, plus many other stations along the same line.

Road links are provided by the village's proximity to the M6 motorway and the East Lancashire Road (A580). Garswood is close to Haydock Industrial / Business Estates, where companies such as Sainsbury's and Booker have warehousing facilities, creating employment for a large surrounding area.

Companies including Arriva, Huyton Travel and Cumfy Bus operate bus services locally and there are links to other areas including St Helens, Rainford, Ashton-in-Makerfield and Billinge.

== See also ==
- Listed buildings in Seneley Green
- List of mining disasters in Lancashire
