= Arthur Welsby =

English footballer

Personal information
- Full name: Arthur Welsby
- Date of birth: 17 November 1902
- Place of birth: Ashton-in-Makerfield, Wigan, England
- Date of death: 24 April 1980 (aged 77)
- Place of death: Bryn, Wigan, England
- Height: 5 ft 7 1/2 in (1.71 m)
- Position: Outside forward

Senior career*
Years	Team	Apps	(Gls)
1923–1931	Wigan Borough	220	(32)
1931–1932	Sunderland	3	(1)
1932–1934	Exeter City	39	(8)
1934–1935	Stockport County	4	(2)
1935–1936	Southport	21	(1)
1936–1937	Cardiff City	3	(0)
1937–1939	Mossley	86	(20)
- * Club domestic league appearances and goals

Arthur Welsby (17 November 1902 – 24 April 1980) was an English footballer who played as an outside forward.

He played for Wigan Borough from 1923 to 1931, and holds the record for most league appearances for the club. Due to the club's financial crisis, he left the club in 1931 and moved to Sunderland, where he made three appearances, scoring one goal. He went on to play for Exeter City, Stockport County, Southport, Cardiff City and Mossley before retiring in 1939.
