= Dowdales School =

Location
- Nelson Street; Dalton-In-Furness, Cumbria, LA15 8AH; England; 54.1590°N 3.1840°W

Information
- Type: Community school
- Established: 1928
- Local authority: Westmorland and Furness
- Department for Education URN: 112383 Tables
- Ofsted: Reports
- Head teacher: Emma Aubrey
- Gender: Mixed
- Age: 11 to 16
- Enrolment: 826
- Website: www.dowdalesschool.co.uk

Dowdales School which was founded 1928, is a community, comprehensive school in Dalton-in-Furness, Cumbria for anyone, in the age range 11–16. There are approximately 826 pupils on roll.

The school was originally based on the former Ashburner House, which is still a part of the school. The name of Dowdales derives from the adjacent field known as Peter Dowdales' Field.

On 28 August 2010, the Dowdales Year 7 Rugby Team defeated Temple Moor at Wembley, to Win the Carnegie Schools Trophy.

As of 2026 the school is an RSC Lead Associate School.

== Inspections ==
As of 2026, the school's most recent inspection by Ofsted was in February 2025; it found that the school had taken "effective action to maintain a good standard".

== Notable alumni ==
- Georgia Stanway, Lioness and English professional football player.
