= Champion Colleges =

UK rugby league football competition

- Nations
- United Kingdom
- College Year Groups
- Years 12 - 13
- Competitions
- Boys, Girls

The Champion Colleges is a rugby league football competition administered by the University and College Rugby League (formerly the Student Rugby League).

It is open to teams in the 12-13 year groups at Sixth Forms and Further Education (FE) Colleges in the UK. The competition determines regional and national champions.

Regional stages take place in Yorkshire, the North West, Cumbria, Midlands, London and the South and Wales between February and March and the national stages running consecutively through to May.

== History ==
The Student Rugby League was founded in 1967 when a team was created at Leeds University by Andrew Cudbertson, Jack Abernathy and Cec Thompson, other teams soon joined in areas of the United Kingdom which lay outside of the game's traditional heartlands. The first university game was between Leeds and Liverpool in 1968. A year later the Universities and Colleges Rugby League was formed after student pioneers fought hard to get the sport recognised in higher education.

The Champion Schools tournament began in 1981 and was re-launched in 2002 by the Rugby Football League in partnership with English Schools Rugby League. The strong growth of Champion Schools, led to the creation of the Champion Colleges competition for years 12–13.

As of 2008, 48 colleges and 800 students participated in the Champion Colleges Cup competition, with 420 schools and 25,000 pupils participating in the related Champion Schools tournament.

Involvement with the competition assisted Leeds Beckett University (then known as Leeds Metropolitan University) in their successful bid to become the UK Centre of Coaching Excellence as well as win the 2008 Coaching Environment of the Year Award.

== National Final result ==
- 2008 St Helens College (St Helens, Lancashire) 20-10 Wigan & Leigh College (Wigan & Leigh, Lancashire)
- 2009
- 2010 Hopwood Hall College bt Leeds City College
- 2011 Wakefield College 20-14 Hopwood Hall College
- 2012 Wakefield College 30-16 Hopwood Hall College

== See also ==
- University and College Rugby League
- Champion Schools tournament
- Junior rugby league in England
- Rugby league in England
- Rugby league in Wales
