= John Thulis =

English Roman Catholic priest

Blessed John Thulis

Martyr
- Born: Baptized 28 December 1568; Up Holland, Lancashire
- Died: 18 March 1616 (aged 48); Lancaster, England
- Venerated in: Roman Catholic Church
- Beatified: 22 November 1987 by Pope John Paul II
- Feast: 18 March (individual with Wrenno); 7 August (one of the Lancaster Martyrs); 22 November (together with Eighty-five martyrs of England and Wales); 29 October (one of the Douai Martyrs)
- Attributes: Chalice

John Thulis (also spelt Thules, Thewlis) (c. 1568 – 18 March 1616) was an English Roman Catholic priest. Beatified in 1987, he is one of the Douai Martyrs.

== Life ==
Thulis was born at Up Holland, Lancashire, probably about 1568. His baptism is recorded in the Whalley Parish Register on 28 December, 1568, the son of William. He arrived at the English College, Reims, on 25 May 1583, and received tonsure from Cardinal Louis de Guise on 23 September following. He left for Rome, on 27 March 1590, where he was ordained priest, and was sent on the English mission in April 1592.

When he arrived back in England he was soon arrested and sent as a prisoner to Wisbech Castle, Cambridgeshire, when he signed the letter of 8 November 1598, in favour of the institution of the archpriest, and the letter of 17 November 1600, against it. It is not clear whether he was released or escaped.

Later he worked in Lancashire, particularly in the areas of Chorley and Whalley. Roger Wrennall was a hand weaver from Kirkham or Chorley, who accompanied Thulis.

They were arrested by William Stanley, 6th Earl of Derby, and committed to Lancaster Castle. It is possible that they were betrayed by a cousin of Thulis. They managed to escape, but were captured the next day. Noted preacher William Leigh, rector of St Wilfrid's Church in Standish, was brought to debate theological points with Thulis; Thulis's godson offered him £20 a year if he would renounce his faith. Thulis converted four thieves while in prison.

On 18 March 1616 Thulis was hanged, drawn, and quartered. His head was affixed to Lancaster Castle; his quarters displayed at Lancaster, Preston, Wigan and Warrington; that at Preston was hung from the church steeple. Wrennall was hanged as a felon for having assisted Thulis.

A metrical account of his martyrdom, as well as portions of a poem composed by Thulis, were printed by John Hungerford Pollen in his Acts of the English Martyrs (London, 1891), 194–207.

== See also ==
- Catholic Church in the United Kingdom
- Douai Martyrs
