= Listed buildings in Seneley Green =

Seneley Green is a civil parish in the Metropolitan Borough of St Helens, Merseyside, England. It contains six buildings that are recorded in the National Heritage List for England as designated listed buildings, all of which are listed at Grade II. This grade is the lowest of the three gradings given to listed buildings and is applied to "buildings of national importance and special interest". The parish contains the village of Garswood, and is otherwise rural. The listed buildings consist of houses, a church, and a former grammar school now used as a library.

Name and location	Photograph	Date	Notes
Manor House; 53.48771°N 2.67548°W	—	16th to 17th century	The house was remodelled in the 18th century. It is roughcast with a slate roof, and is in two storeys with a six-bay front. The two outer bays on each side project forward, they are taller than the central bays, and are Georgian in type. The doorway is in the fourth bay, it has an entablature on consoles, a dentilled cornice, and an elliptical fanlight. The windows are sashes, those on the right side being horizontally-sliding.
Hollin Hey Farmhouse; 53.48153°N 2.69855°W		1680	The upper floor was rebuilt in 1875. The house is in two storeys with a four-bay front. The lower storey is in stone, and the upper storey in red brick with some blue brick banding. The entrance is in the third bay, it has a pointed head, and porch with diagonal buttresses. Above it is a gablet. The windows are mullioned and transomed. On the right side is a rectangular bay window with a crenelated parapet.
Garswood Library; 53.48835°N 2.67313°W		1728	Rebuilding of a grammar school founded in 1589, and later used as a library. It is in stone with a slate roof, and has two storeys and a three-bay front. The windows on the ground floor have mullions and transoms; those on the upper floor only have mullions. On the south front is a three-bay extension; two of the bays are gabled.
Hollin Hey House; 53.48156°N 2.70063°W	—	Early 19th century	A brick house with a slate roof in two storeys with an attic and a three-bay front. The central round-headed doorway has pilasters, an open pediment and a fanlight. To the right of the doorway is a canted bay window. All the windows are sashes, and some have wedge lintels. At the rear is a full-height stair window.
Holy Trinity Church; 53.49895°N 2.66834°W		1837–38	The church was designed by John Palmer, the chancel dates from 1914, and the top stage of the tower from 1938. It is in stone with a slate roof, and is in Gothic Revival style. The church consists of a nave with west transepts, a chancel with a north vestry, and a west tower. The tower has a west entrance and clock face, and an octagonal top stage with a plain parapet. The windows are lancets.
Old Rectory; 53.49912°N 2.66789°W	—	1840	A stone house with a slate roof, it is in two storeys with five bays, and has an irregular plan. Two bays are gabled and project forward, one has a parapet, and another bay has a half-dormer. The entrance is in the second bay and is approached by steps. On the left side is a rectangular bay window.
