= John Bramwell (footballer) =

English footballer

Personal information
- Date of birth: 1 March 1937 (age 89)
- Place of birth: Ashton-in-Makerfield, England
- Position: Left back

Senior career*
Years	Team	Apps	(Gls)
1954–1958	Wigan Athletic	83	(2)
1958–1960	Everton	52	(0)
1960–1965	Luton Town	187	(1)
- Runcorn Town
- * Club domestic league appearances and goals

John Bramwell (born 1 March 1937 in Ashton-in-Makerfield) is an English former professional footballer who played in the Football League for Everton and Luton Town.

Bramwell started his career at non-league Wigan Athletic, making 83 Lancashire Combination appearances for the club before moving to Everton for a fee of £3,500. He was known for his accurate passing on the field and wisecracking off the field.

Bramwell replaced Jimmy Tansey at left-back in September 1958 and kept his place in the side for the rest of the season. He was a steady performer but lacked a bit of pace and over committed to challenges sometimes leaving him stranded. In his second season at Goodison John had to contest his place with Tommy Jones who had moved there for centre-half. John left Everton as part of the deal that brought Billy Bingham from Luton Town and showed the best form of his career while there.

John Bramwell made 56 appearances for Everton but never scored. His only goal came while he was at Luton where he made 187 appearances between 1960 and 1965.
