= Gillette National Youth League =

Former British rugby league tournament

National Youth League
- National Youth League
- Sport: Rugby league
- Inaugural season: 2005–06
- Number of teams: 18
- Country: United Kingdom
- Champions: Ince Rose Bridge (2010–11)
- Website: www.nationalyouthleague.co.uk

The Gilette National Youth League was a British rugby league tournament at under-18 level. The Halifax Home Insurance National Youth League was its previous name.

It is the second-tier competition at under-18s. The top level is the Gilette Academy Championship, which in 2009 consists of the under-18 team of the twelve English based Super League teams and also of Championship clubs Widnes Vikings and Sheffield Eagles.

It was administered by the British Amateur Rugby League Association. In 2011 it switched to summer as the Conference Youth League. After the 2012 season the league was abolished and teams returned to local leagues.

== 2012 participants ==
=== West division ===
- Folly Lane
- Leigh East
- North Wales Crusaders
- Rylands Sharks
- Saddleworth Rangers
- Wigan St Jude's
- NB: Pilkington Recs, Thatto Heath Crusaders and Leigh Miners Rangers failed to complete the season

=== East division ===
- Dewsbury Celtic
- Newcastle Thunder
- Hemel Stags
- Holderness Vikings
- Hunslet Warriors
- Milford Marlins
- West Hull
- NB: Keighley Cougars Cubs and East Leeds failed to complete the season

== Participants in previous seasons ==
- 2005–06: Blackbrook, Bradford Dudley Hill, Castleford Lock Lane, Drighlington, Embassy Longhill, Hensingham, Ince Rose Bridge, Kells, Leigh East, Leigh Miners Rangers, Siddal, Waterhead, West Hull, Wibsey Juniors, Widnes St Mary's, Wigan St Jude's
- 2006–07: Bradford Dudley Hill, Castleford Lock Lane, Featherstone Lions, Hensingham, Ince Rose Bridge, Keighley Cougar Cubs, Kells, Leigh East, Leigh Miners Rangers, Siddal, Waterhead, West Bowling, West Hull, Wibsey Juniors, Widnes St Mary's, Wigan St Patrick's (Bradford Dudley Hill and West Bowling failed to complete the season)
- 2007–08: East Leeds, Elland, Featherstone Lions, Gateshead Thunder, Hensingham, Ince Rose Bridge, Keighley Cougar Cubs, Kells, Leigh East, Leigh Miners Rangers, Rylands, Saddleworth Rangers, Siddal, Waterhead, West Hull, Wibsey Juniors (Hensingham failed to complete the season)
- 2008-9: Celtic Crusaders Colts, East Leeds, Featherstone Lions, Gateshead Thunder, Ince Rose Bridge, Keighley Cougar Cubs, Leigh East, Leigh Miners Rangers, North London Stags, Saddleworth Rangers, Siddal, Waterhead, West Cumbria, West Hull (Waterhead failed to complete the season)
- 2009–10: Barrow Laikers, Castleford Lock Lane, Celtic Crusaders Colts, East Leeds, Featherstone Lions, Gateshead Thunder, Halifax Siddal, Hemel Stags, Ince Rose Bridge, Keighley Cougar Cubs, Leigh East, Saddleworth Rangers, Sheffield Hillsborough Hawks, Stanningley, West Cumbria, West Hull, Widnes St Maries, Widnes West Bank Bears
- 2010: Short season due to change over to summer season: Bradford Dudley Hill, Castleford Lock Lane, Dewsbury Celtic, Featherstone Lions, Gateshead Thunder, Hemal Stags, Holderness Vickings, Ince Rose Bridge, Keighley Cougar Cubs, Leeds Stanningley, Leigh East, Leigh Miners Rangers, Milford Marlins, Saddleworth Rangers, Sheffield Hillsborough Hawks, Thatto Heath Crusaders, West Cumbria, Widnes West Bank Bears.
- 2011: East: Bradford Dudley Hill, Castleford Lock Lane, Dewsbury Celtic, East Leeds, Gateshead Thunder, Hemel Stags, Holderness Vikings, Hunslet Warriors, Keighley Cougar Cubs, Leeds Milford Marlins, Saddleworth Rangers – Featherstone Lions failed to complete the season
- 2011: West: Halton Farnworth Hornets, Ince Rose Bridge, Leigh East, Leigh Miners Rangers, North Wales Crusaders, Thatto Heath Crusaders, Warrington Crosfields, Warrington Rylands Sharks, Widnes West Bank, Wigan St Judes, – CPC Bears and West Cumbria failed to complete the season

== Winners ==
2005–06	Widnes St Maries	20–18	Siddal
200–07	Siddal	10–8	West Hull
2007–08	Leigh Miners Rangers	21–20	West Hull
2008–09	Celtic Crusaders Colts	32–0	Leigh Miners Rangers
2009–10	West Cumbria	26–25	Stanningley
2010	Ince Rose Bridge	42–6	Dewsbury Celtic

== See also ==
- Junior rugby league in England
