= Castleford Academy =

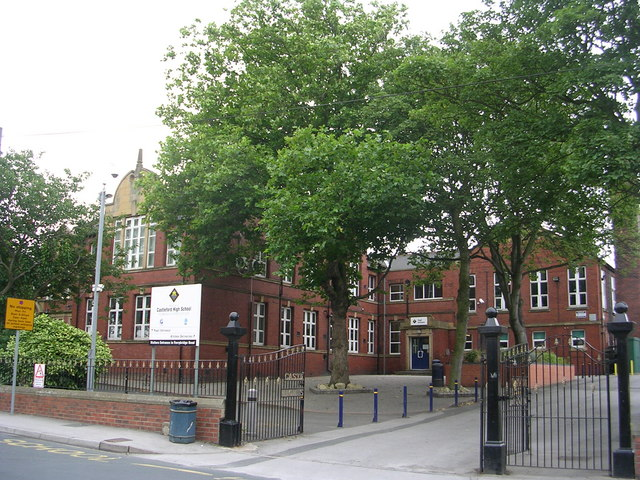
- The school in 2011

Location
- Ferrybridge Road; Castleford, West Yorkshire, WF10 4JQ; England; 53.7250°N 1.3414°W

Information
- Type: Academy
- Established: 1906/1973
- Local authority: City of Wakefield
- Department for Education URN: 136633 Tables
- Ofsted: Reports
- Headteacher: Wesley Bush
- Age: 11 to 18
- Enrolment: 1412
- Colours: Black, Yellow, Grey
- Website: castlefordacademy.com

Castleford Academy is a secondary school in Castleford, West Yorkshire, England for children aged 11–16 located on Ferrybridge Road, just east of the town centre and next to Queen's Park.

== History ==
Castleford Secondary School was established in 1906 to meet the need for secondary education in the town, which then had a population of 17,000. The secondary school provided education to children of both sexes and employed both male and female teachers, which was not common for that time. The main school buildings were opened in 1909.

By the time of the school's Golden Jubilee in 1956 it was called Castleford Grammar School. In 1970 the Grammar School joined with a secondary modern school to become a comprehensive school called Castleford High School. School uniform was abolished at the same time. From 1989, a partnership was developed with Hickson & Welch, a local chemical company and school uniform was re-introduced and the school became a Technology College. In 1995 a new drama theatre was built.

In September 2007 the school was officially renamed Castleford High School Technology and Sports College due to the success of the rugby, football and netball teams gaining it a Sports College classification.

The school's boys and girls rugby league teams have been a dominant force in the Champion Schools competition; in 2009 the school fielded 6 teams in the national finals for the third year in succession.

On 1 April 2011, the school was renamed Castleford Academy and was registered as a charity under the Academies Act 2010, a move that allowed the school to set its own curriculum.

== Academic performance ==
The school gets reasonable results at GCSE for West Yorkshire, well above the England average. There is the sixth form college on site, also NEW College is located nearby, and Castleford Academy now offer a Sports A level. In the sixth form college they offer 3 BTEC Extended Diplomas (at Level 3) in Performance and Excellence (sport), Health and Social Care, and Public Services (uniformed).

== Arson ==
The school has suffered from one incident of arson, with a fire on 4 January 2007 started by three teenagers. It was put out by ten fire engines. It completely gutted the sports hall.

== Head Teachers ==
Castleford Secondary School and Castleford Grammar School

- Thomas Richard Dawes (1906–1930)
- J.L. Hampson (1930–1955)
- E. Riley (1955–1973)

Castleford High School

- Peter Hughes (1973–1981)
- Malcolm Butler (1981–1988)
- David Earnshaw (1989–1995)
- Michael Porter (1995–2005)
- Roy Vaughan (2005–2012)

Castleford Academy

- Steven White (2012–2013)
- George Panayiotou (2013–2021)
- Wesley Bush (2021–present)

== Alumni ==
- Mike Amesbury (born 1969), Labour MP for Runcorn and Helsby
- Nigel Beard (1936–2017), Labour MP for Bexleyheath and Crayford from 1997–2005
- Tim Bresnan (born 1985), English and Yorkshire Cricket player from 1995–2001
- J. L. Carr (1912–1994), school teacher, novelist and publisher
- Hollie-Mae Dodd (born 2003), rugby league footballer
- Henry Moore (1898–1986) OM CH, sculptor
- Alan Rhodes (born 1947), rugby league footballer who played in the 1960s, 1970s and 1980s, and coached in the 1980s
- David Treasure (born 1950), rugby player
- Denzil Webster (1933–2010), cricketer, rugby union and professional rugby league footballer
