= Jimmy Tansey =

English footballer (1929–2012)

Personal information
- Full name: James Tansey
- Date of birth: 29 January 1929
- Place of birth: Liverpool
- Date of death: 7 July 2012 (aged 83)
- Position: Left back

Youth career
- 1948–1953: Everton

Senior career*
Years	Team	Apps	(Gls)
1953–1960	Everton	133	(0)
1960–1961	Crewe Alexandra	9	(0)
- South Liverpool
Total		142	(0)
- * Club domestic league appearances and goals

Jimmy Tansey (29 January 1929 – 7 July 2012) was an English professional footballer who played for Everton in the 1950s and Crewe Alexandra in the 1960s.

His grandson, Greg Tansey, is also a footballer and most recently played for St Mirren

== Playing career ==
Liverpool-born Tansey joined local club Everton as a youth team player in 1948, and made his first-team debut in a 2–2 draw against Notts County in 1953. He established himself as a first-team regular in the 1954–55 season, making 39 league appearances. He remained the club's first-choice left back until he was superseded by John Bramwell in the 1958–59 season. He transferred to Crewe Alexandra the following season.

== Death ==
Tansey died on 7 July 2012, aged 83.
