= Junior rugby league in England =

Rugby league is played at a school level in many schools in the rugby league heartlands of the traditional counties of Yorkshire, Lancashire and Cumberland; recently it has been introduced into some schools outside the traditional areas in particular in London, Essex and Hertfordshire. Thirty-three percent of schools across the UK offer rugby league as a school sport.

Charlie Bray is the youth league representative on the Community Board.

== Young People's Advisory Panel ==
The RFL launched the Young Peoples Advisory Panel in 2010, a group consisting of young people aged 16–25 from across England. The national panel meet three times a year at the RFL's Red Hall headquarters to discuss and debate the following:

Changes in the structure of youth rugby; Communications between young rugby league enthusiasts and the RFL; RFL policies which impact on young people.

Two nominated members will also sit on the Youth & Junior Forum, a key device used to advance youth rugby league.

== Forms of the game ==
Both males and females can play youth and junior rugby league, in fact from under-7 up to the under-11 teams are of mixed gender. The age groups at clubs run from under-7 all the way up to under-18 and at present there are around 500 clubs. There are currently more than 30 community clubs who have developed female sections, with over 600 girls aged between 11 and 16 registered to play for sides at the under-12, under-14 and under-16 age groups.

The Rugby Football League uses two modified forms of rugby league created by ARL Development in Australia. Mini league (known as mini footy in Australia) is played by all children up to Year 4 of Primary School. It is designed to provide children with a safe environment, a firm knowledge of the laws of rugby league and a chance to practice the skills such as tackling, passing and common defensive and attacking tactics. Players up to and including Year 6 of Primary School play mod league. Mod league is a bridge between mini league and full contact rugby league. On completion of mod league, players make a move to full international rugby league laws.

Tag rugby, touch rugby and rugby league nines are also widely used to introduce young children to the sport of rugby league.

== English Schools Rugby League ==
English Schools Rugby League was formed in 1967 following talks between the counties of Lancashire and Yorkshire. It was formed to enable the organising and playing of International games, to act as one body for the disbursement of Grant Aid received from the RFL and to act as an organising body to spread the game and to be a forum for committed and expert opinion.

== Champion Schools ==
The Champion Schools tournament is a national competition for secondary schools. The RFL in partnership with English Schools Rugby League re-launched the Champion Schools Tournament in 2002 and since then it has continued to grow each year.

In the 2005/6 academic year over 1,200 teams and 20,000 players competed in the Champion Schools tournament, making it the largest rugby league competition in the world. Eighty percent of participants are new to rugby league. The growth of the Champion Schools tournament led to the creation of the Carnegie Champion Colleges competition for Years 12 and 13. The regionally based competition was introduced in 2008 and started in January.

== Regional leagues and competitions ==
British Amateur Rugby League Association runs the Gilette National Youth League as well as the Yorkshire combination, West Riding Youth League, Hull & District Youth League, North West Counties U15 - U13, North West Counties U8 - U12 and North West Counties Youth. There are county cups at age group level, known as the Yorkshire Youth Cup, Lancashire Youth Cup and the Cumbria Youth Cup.

The non-heartlands junior leagues include the Chilterns Junior Rugby League, London Junior League, North East Junior League, Midlands Junior League and Bristol Junior Rugby League.

== Academies ==
Professional and semi-professional teams run academy sides to develop young talent. The Academy under- 18 league was introduced in 1991.

The under-20s Super League competition is a full league with twenty rounds and top six play-offs. The under-18s, under-16s and under-15s are non-competitive and feature eight rounds in under-18s and six in under-16s and under-15s. Championship and Championship 1 sides have their own reserve grade.

The under-18s is open to either Super League clubs or Championship sides that meet very stringent criteria. The under-16s and under-15s are open to all Super League, Championship and Championship 1 sides.
