= Catholic Church of St Oswald and St Edmund Arrowsmith =

Church in Greater Manchester, England

Coordinates: 53.485°N 2.641°W

St Oswald and St Edmund Arrowsmith
- Shrine and Parish Church of St Oswald and St Edmund Arrowsmith, Ashton-in-Makerfield
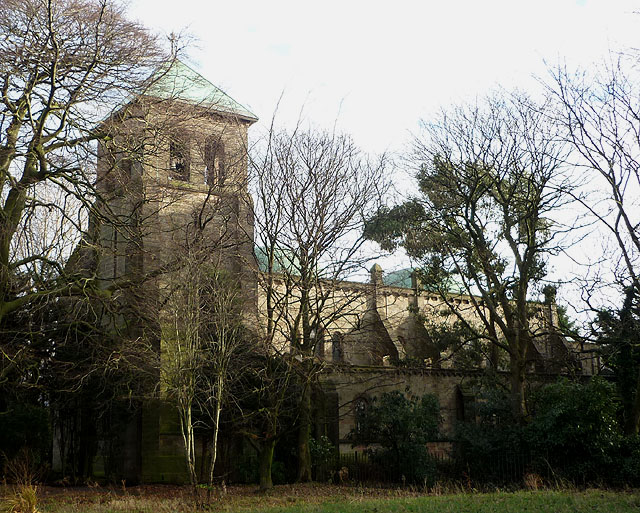
- St Oswald and St Edmund Arrowsmith
- OS grid reference: SJ 57561 98912
- Location: Ashton-in-Makerfield
- Country: England
- Denomination: Roman Catholic
- Website: St Oswald and St Edmund Arrowsmith Parish

History
- Status: Active
- Dedication: St Oswald & St Edmund Arrowsmith

Architecture
- Functional status: Parish church
- Architect: John Sydney Brocklesby
- Architectural type

Listed Building – Grade II*
- Designated: 10 May 1988
- Reference no.: 1068462
- Style: Romanesque
- Completed: 1930

Administration
- Archdiocese: Liverpool
- Deanery: Wigan

Clergy
- Priest: Rev Canon John Gorman

The Catholic Church of St Oswald and St Edmund Arrowsmith is a Roman Catholic parish church located on Liverpool Road in Ashton-in-Makerfield, Greater Manchester, England, which is a Grade II-listed building and includes the Diocesan Shrine of St Edmund Arrowsmith.

== Building ==
The first Catholic church on the site was built in 1822. The old church was demolished and the foundation stone of the new building was laid in 1925.

The present church was constructed in the Romanesque style and completed in 1930, with the architect being John Sydney Brocklesby. The bell tower, on the right of the facade is a notable landmark with its green copper pyramid roof that can be seen on the drive into Ashton from Stubshaw Cross. The interior has two saucer domes and an apse. The altar itself has marble flooring and four red carpets. It has four seats either side for the Altar servers to be seated. At the back of the altar is the Tabernacle, and eight candles. Above the altar are stained glass windows of saints designed by Harry Clarke.

The presbytery and the church gates, which both date from 1822, are also Grade II Listed. The church itself was upgraded to a II* listing in 2026.

Nikolaus Pevsner described the church as "totally outdated" but "ambitious" and "impressive".

== Relic ==
The church houses a holy relic, the hand of St Edmund Arrowsmith, who was one of the Forty Martyrs of England and Wales.

== Parish priests ==
- Canon James O'Meara 1896–1946
- Fr John Joseph McLaughlin 1946–1950
- Canon Robert Wilfrid Meagher 1950–1970
- Canon Francis J Ripley 1970–1991
- Fr Brian Newns 1991–2019
- Fr John Gorman 2019–

== Gallery ==
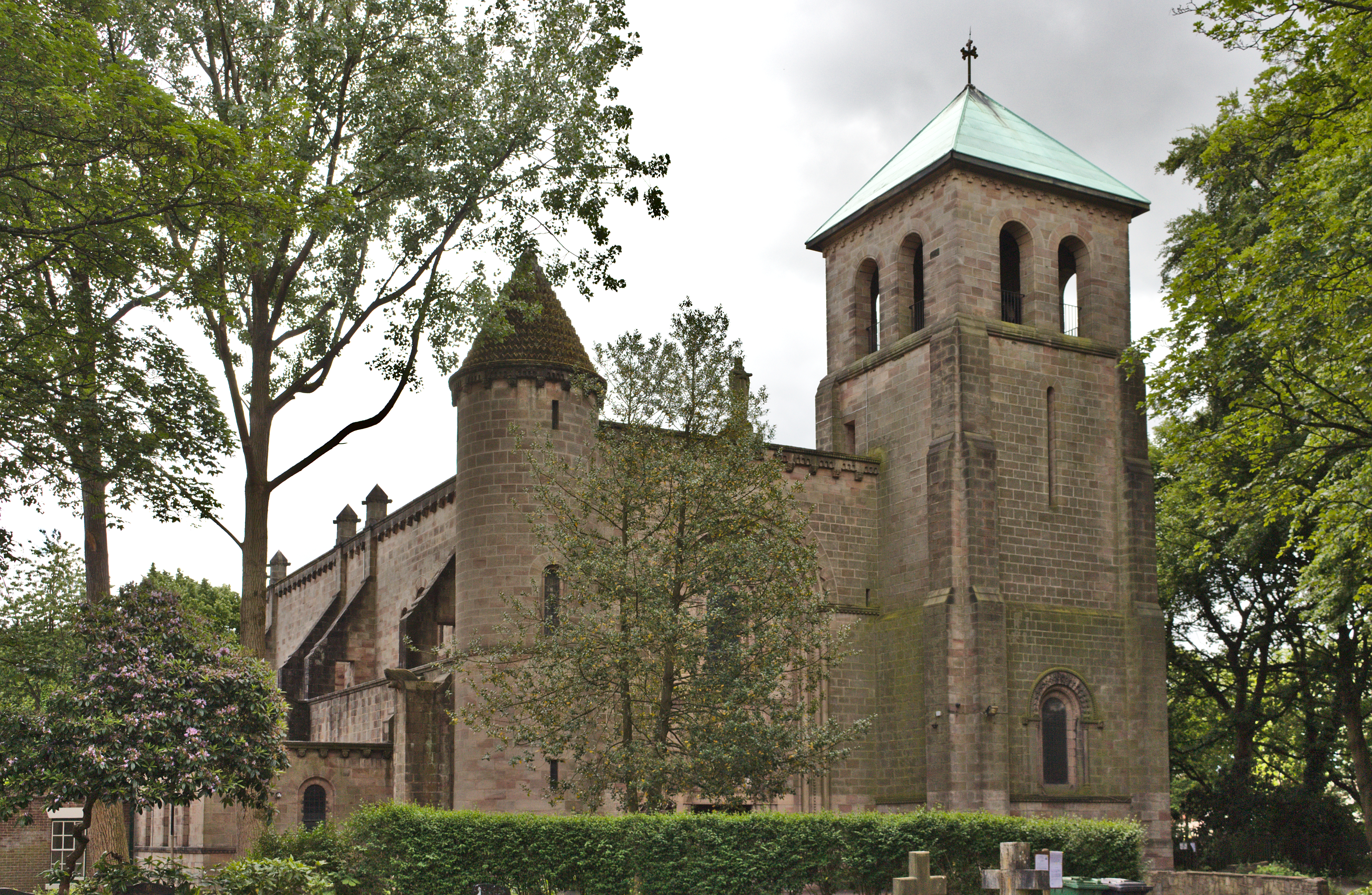
Exterior: Church

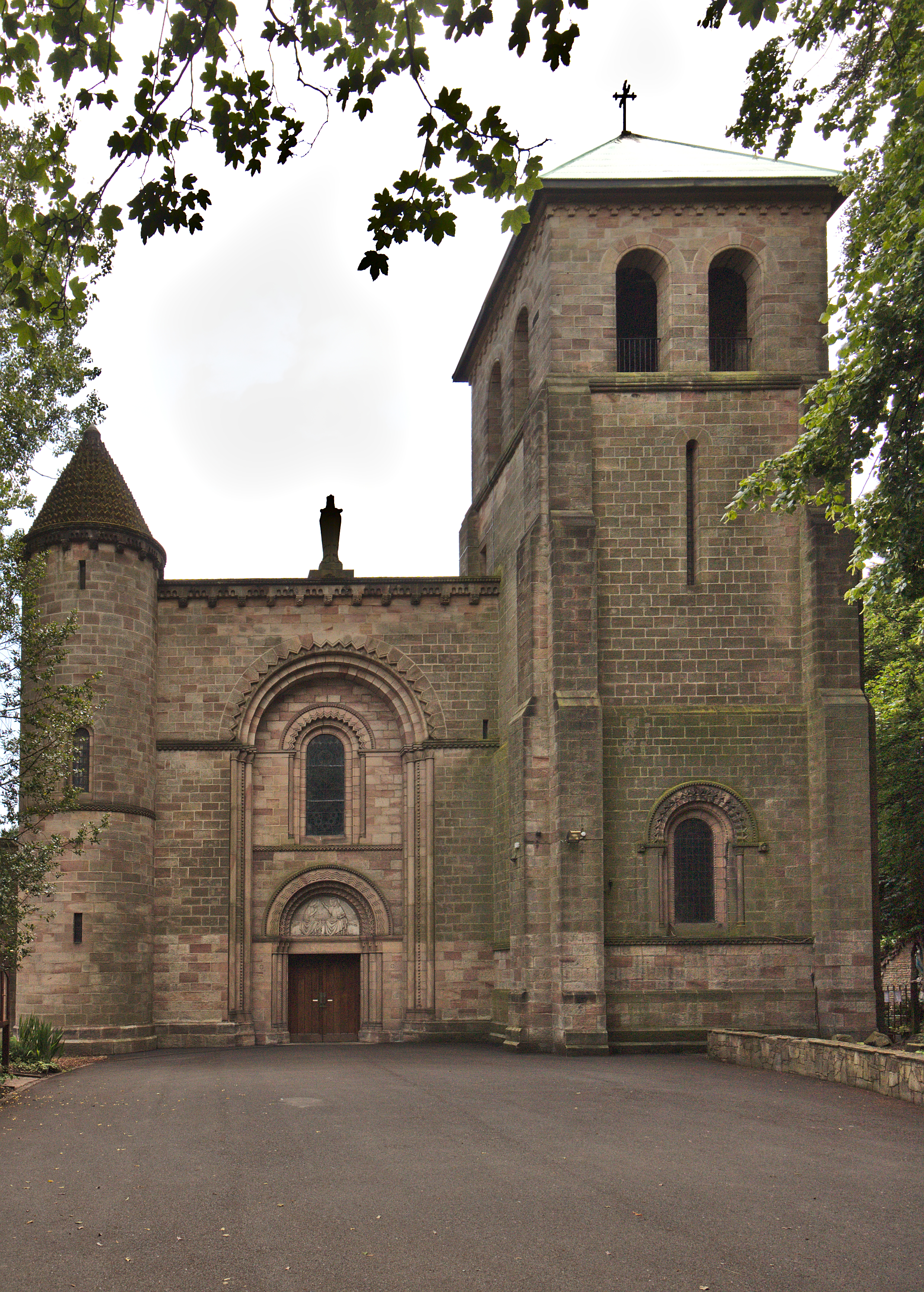
Exterior: Church

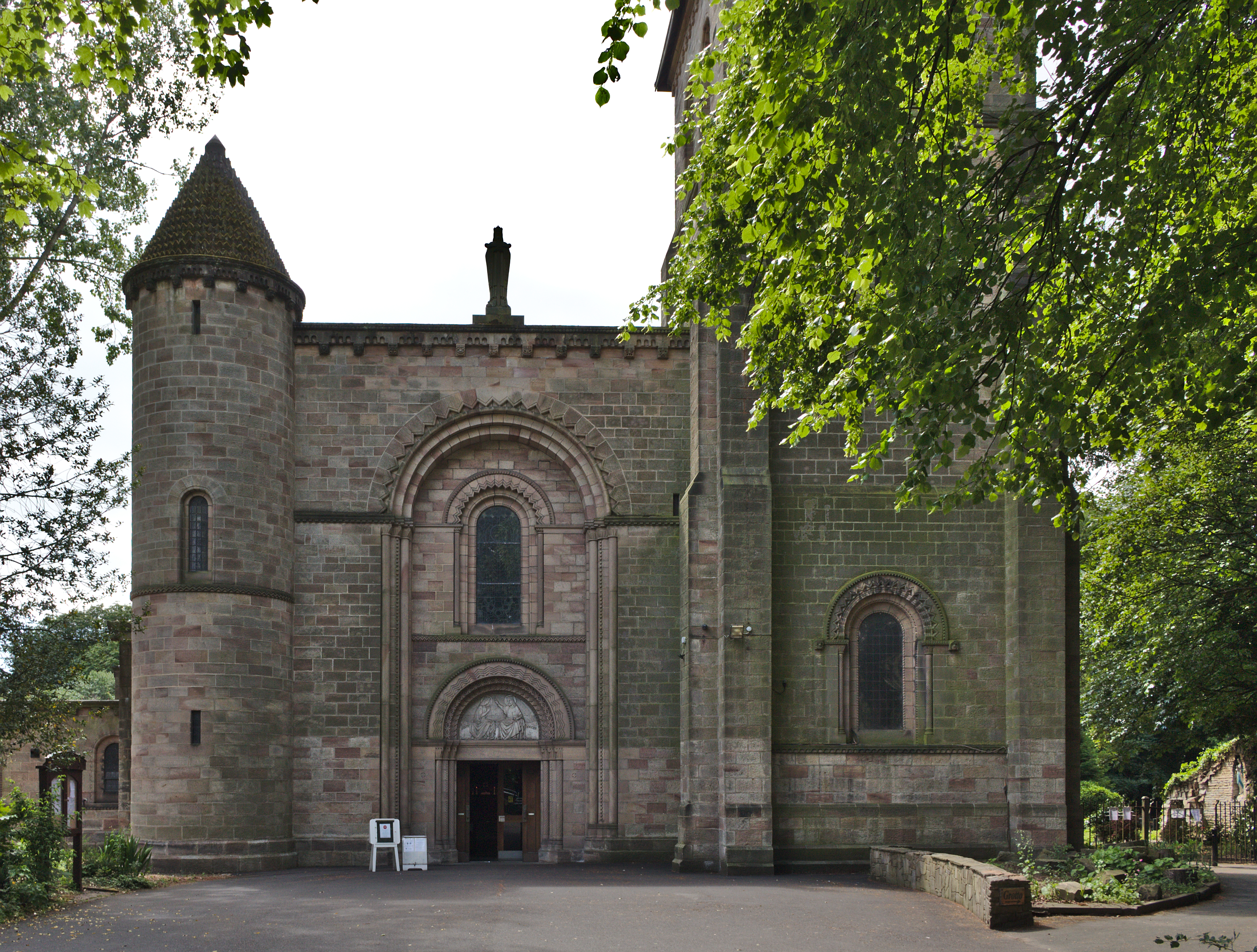
Exterior: West End

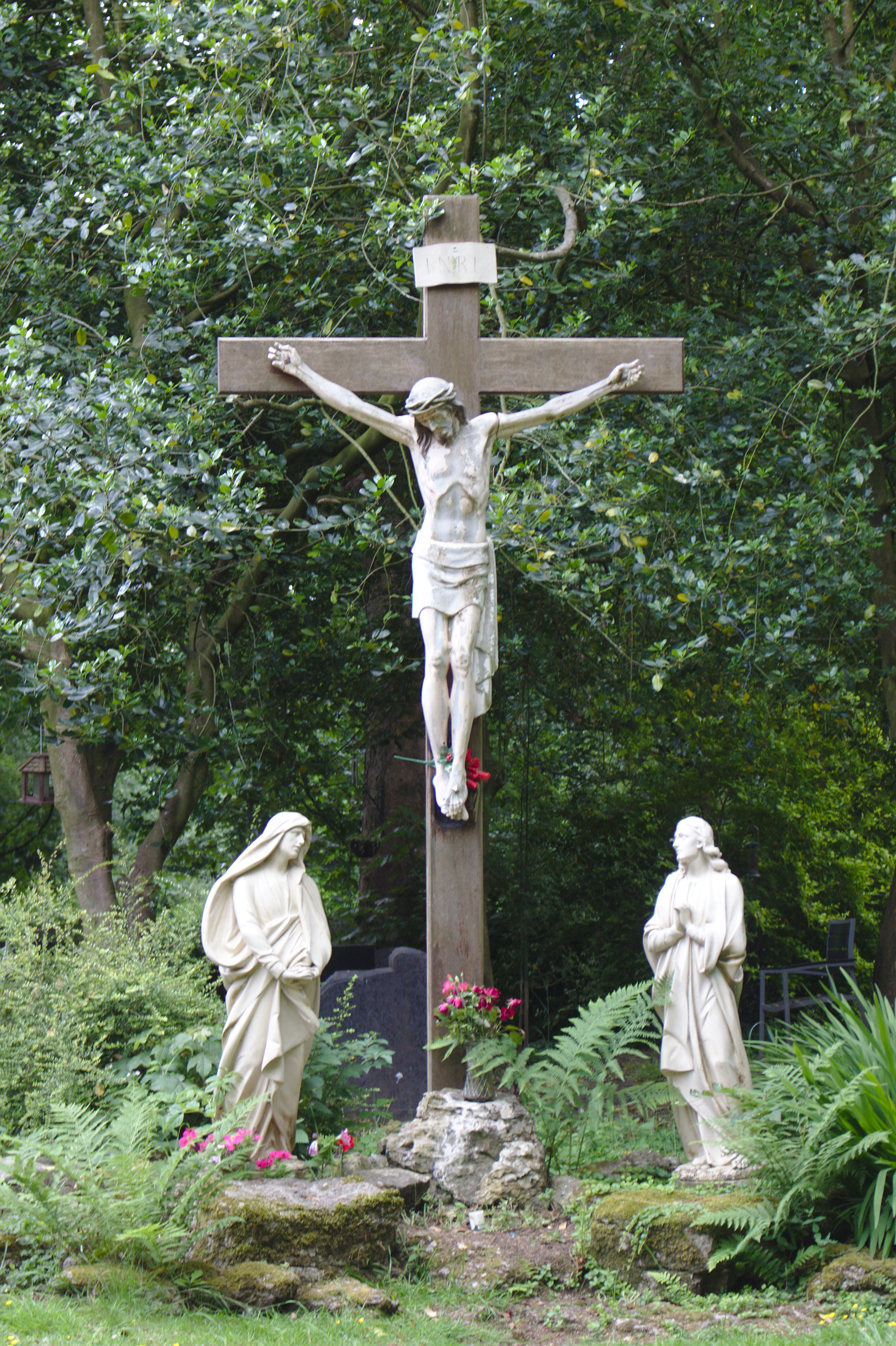
Churchyard

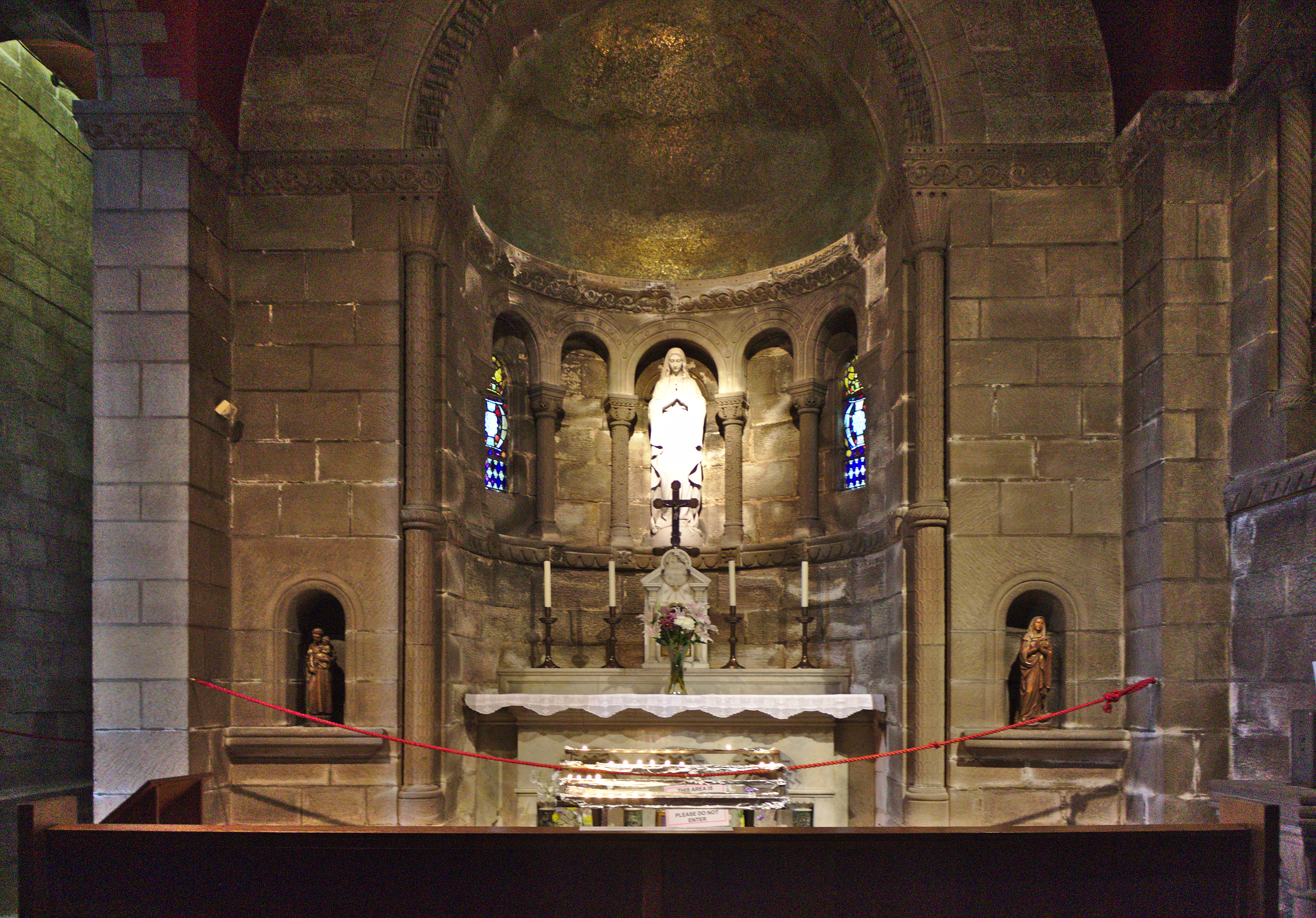
Interior: North Chapel

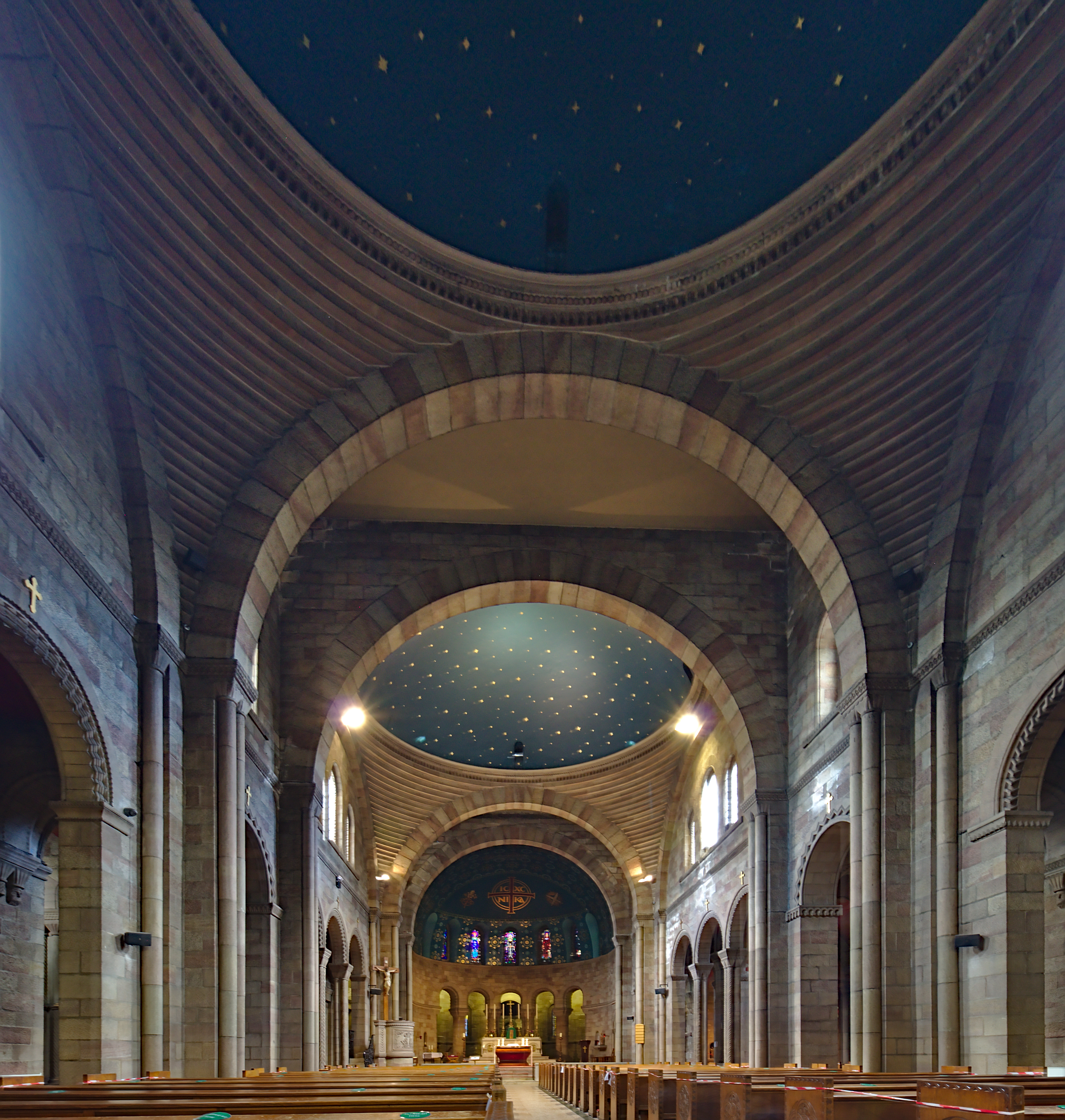
Interior: Nave

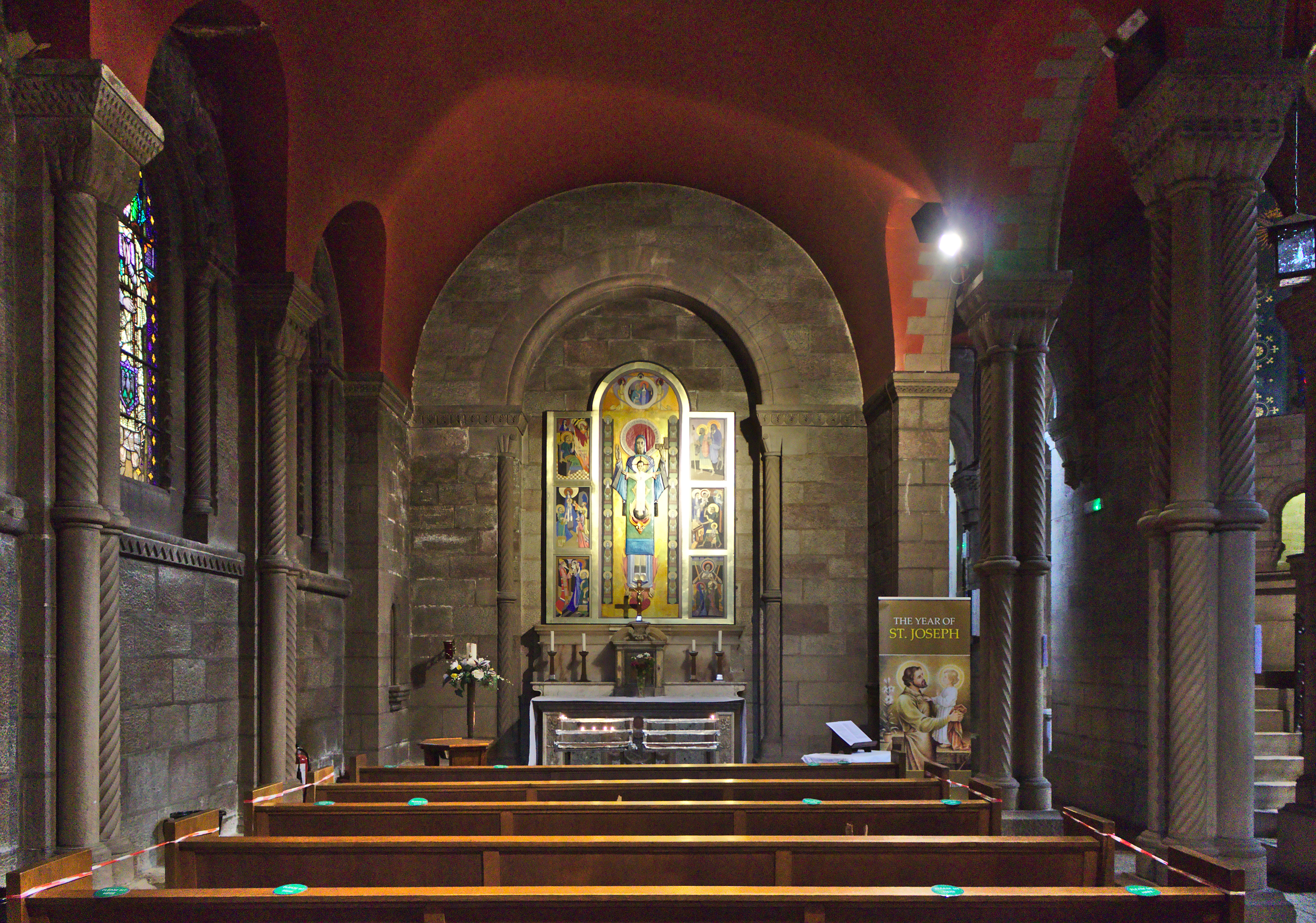
Interior: South Chapel

== See also ==
- Listed buildings in Ashton-in-Makerfield
