= Ashton-in-Makerfield =

Town in Greater Manchester, England

Coordinates: 53.487°N 2.641°W

- Town
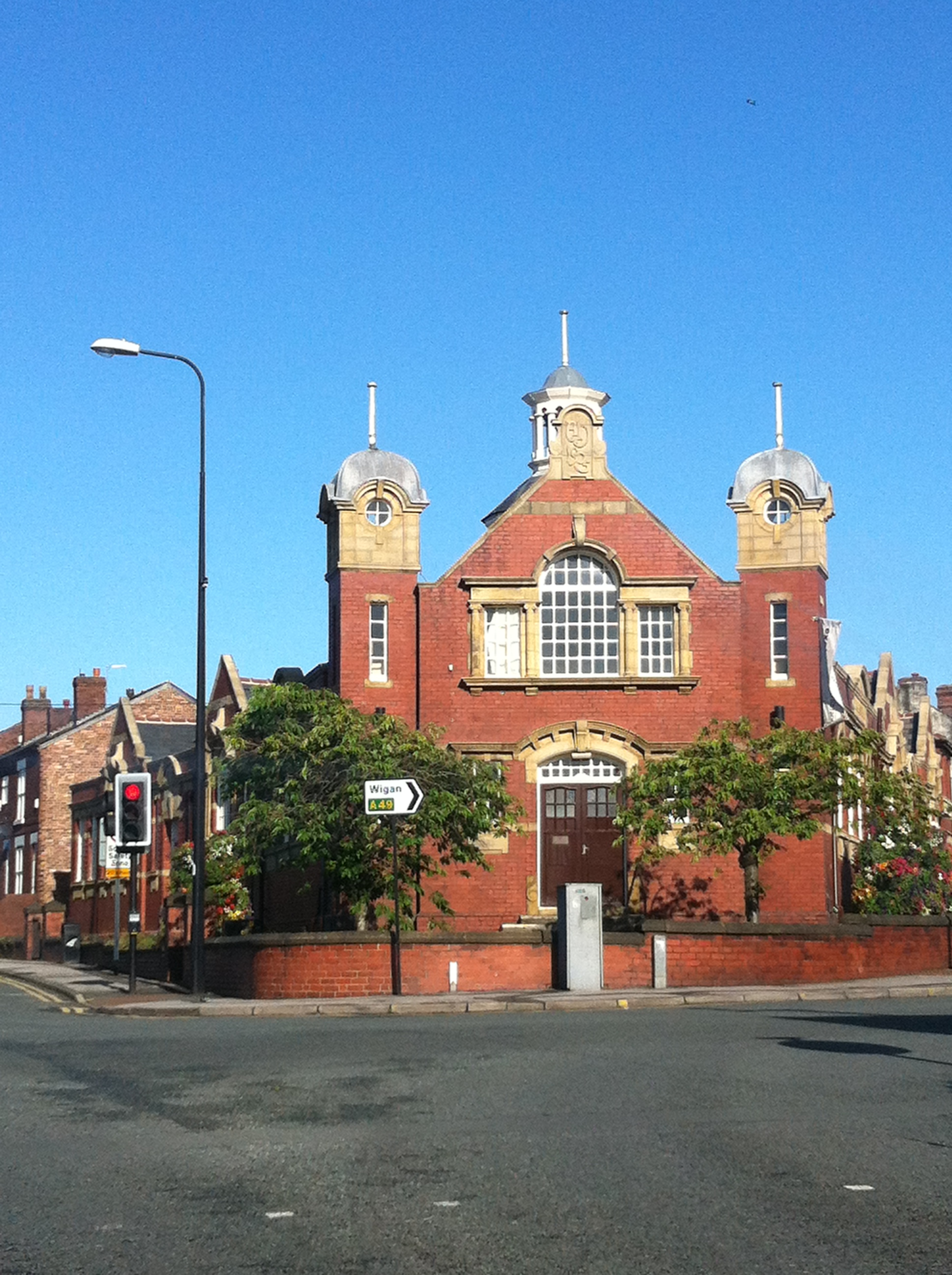
- Ashton-in-Makerfield Library

- Location within Greater Manchester
- Population: 26,380
- OS grid reference: SJ574992
  - London: 173 mi (278 km) SE
- Metropolitan borough: Wigan
- Metropolitan county: Greater Manchester
- Region: North West
- Country: England
- Sovereign state: United Kingdom
- Post town: WIGAN
- Postcode district: WN4
- Dialling code: 01942
- Police: Greater Manchester
- Fire: Greater Manchester
- Ambulance: North West
- UK Parliament: Makerfield

Ashton-in-Makerfield is a market town in the Metropolitan Borough of Wigan, Greater Manchester, England, 4 miles (6.4 km) south of Wigan. As of the 2021 census, there was a population of 26,380.

Historically part of Lancashire, Ashton-in-Makerfield was a township in the parish of Newton-in-Makerfield (as Newton-le-Willows was once known), Winwick and hundred of West Derby. With neighbouring Haydock, Ashton-in-Makerfield was a chapelry, but the two were split in 1845. The place has long been a centre for the manufacture of locks and hinges, and it also sits on the Lancashire Coalfield, and was a coal mining district.

== History ==
=== Toponymy ===
The name Ashton derives from Old English and means the "farmstead where the ash-trees grow"; it is a common name and is found locally in Ashton-under-Lyne in Tameside and Ashton upon Mersey in Trafford. The town's name was recorded as Eston in 1212. Later, the suffix "in-Makerfield" was added, which relates the name of the old district of Makerfield of which Ashton was a part; Makerfield derives from the Celtic for a wall or ruin and the Old English word feld, meaning "open land".

=== Religious history ===
St Thomas' Church of England parish church on Warrington Road has ancient origins although the present building was completed in 1893. The graveyard is the resting place of many of the 189 victims of the Wood Pit explosion (at Haydock on Friday 7 June 1878), the worst coal-mining disaster in Lancashire at the time.

Hope Church on Heath Road was founded by Protestants from St Thomas' opposed to the High Church ideals brought in by a new Vicar in the 1870s. His introduction of Anglo-Catholic worship caused riots on Gerard Street and he was initially evicted from the town by a mob of miners. He returned backed by troops from Liverpool. Banned from worshipping in the form they had previously done, many left and continued a simpler form of worship in a barn off Ashton Heath. Word of their plight reached a Miss Catherine Cave-Browne in London who sent money for a Protestant Mission to be built. The church was built with the official title of Cave-Browne Protestant Institute (Christchurch).

Park Lane Chapel (see Unitarianism), Wigan Road, Bryn, dates back to 1697, although its congregation was founded in 1662. It is the oldest non-conformist chapel and congregation in the district. By the 19th century Park Lane was only one of nine non-conformist chapels in the area. There was a Baptist, Congregational church (Hilton Street), Evangelical (Heath Road), Independent, Independent Methodist (Downall Green Road), Primitive Methodist, Welsh Wesleyan Methodist and English Wesleyan Methodist chapel.

The Catholic Church of St Oswald and St Edmund Arrowsmith, on Liverpool Road was completed in 1930, replacing an earlier Catholic church on the site which was built in 1822. It houses the hand of St Edmund Arrowsmith (1585–1628).

=== Coal mining and heavy industry ===
Ashton-in-Makerfield was part of the St. Helens Area of the South Lancashire Coalfield. The St Helens Area lay to the South West of the Wigan area and occupied around 60 square miles (160 km^{2}), skirting Wigan, Warrington, Widnes and to within eight miles (13 km) of Liverpool.

In 1867 there were 13 collieries in the district of Ashton-in-Makerfield. Others followed including Bryn Hall Colliery, owned by Edward Frederick Crippin, the Mains and Park Lane Collieries. Park Colliery and some of those opened in 1867 (e.g. Garswood Hall) remained productive until the 1950s.

A number of Ashton's coal miners made a significant impact on modern British history, including: Stephen Walsh M.P.; William Kenealy, V.C. and Lance-Corporal in the 1st Lancashire Fusiliers; and Joe Gormley, President of the National Union of Mineworkers in the 1970s and 1980s.

In the late 19th century, the district was described by one observer as having "extensive collieries, cotton mills and potteries", and famed for the manufacture of "hinges, locks, files and nails". Mills such as the Record Mill (Spinning), situated in York Road, and the Makerfield Mill (the 'Weaving Shed'), in Windsor Road, took over from home-working. Similarly, Thomas Crompton & Sons in Gerard Street, which would eventually employ around 1,200 workers, superseded the subcontracting system that sustained substantial numbers of locally based blacksmiths and other craftsmen.

As recently as the 1970s the district of Ashton-in-Makerfield had one of the highest proportions of derelict land, mainly in the form of spoil tips, left over from coal mining. Major land reclamation schemes have since completely transformed the area.

== Governance ==
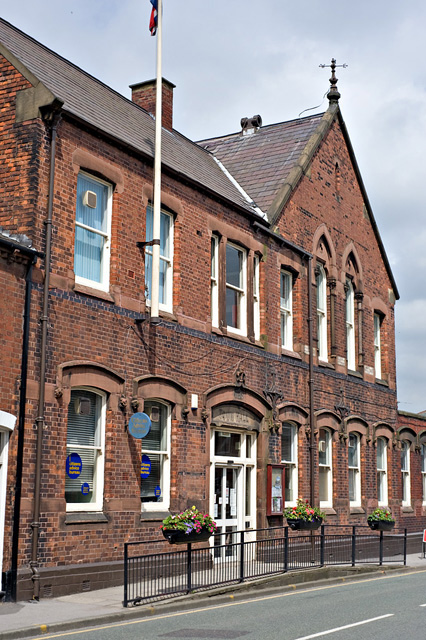
Former Ashton-in-Makerfield Town Hall (demolished in 2017)

Before 1894 Ashton-in-Makerfield was a township in the parish of Winwick, part of the West Derby Hundred of Lancashire. By an Act in 1845 and the division of the Parish of Winwick, Holy Trinity Church, Downall Green, was made the principal parish church and St. Thomas' made a parish church in the same Act, both being part of the Diocese of Liverpool. By the Local Government Act 1894 Ashton-in-Makerfield was made an urban district.

In 1974, under the Local Government Act 1972, the district was abolished, with the area split administratively. The Seneley Green Parish, containing Garswood, Pewfall and Downall Green, falling now within the Metropolitan Borough of St Helens in the newly created Merseyside, and the rest now being administered by the Metropolitan Borough of Wigan in the newly created Greater Manchester. Ashton-in-Makerfield Town Hall was demolished in 2017.

The section of Ashton-in-Makerfield within the Metropolitan Borough of Wigan creates the Bryn & Ashton Township, consisting of the six 'neighbourhoods' of Bryn, Ashton, Ashton Heath, Landgate, Stubshaw Cross and Town Green, and one of the ten areas into which Wigan Metropolitan Borough has been divided for consultation purposes. Each township has a forum, with some influence over the provision of municipal services.

== Railway transport ==
Ashton-in-Makerfield railway station, which was situated off Lodge Lane in neighbouring Haydock, opened in 1900 as part of the Great Central Railway and closed in 1952.

Today the town is now served by stations in nearby Garswood and Bryn stations, both on the line between Wigan North Western and Liverpool Lime Street.

== Demography ==
=== Population change ===
Population growth in Ashton-in-Makerfield since 1901
Year	1901	1911	1921	1931	1939	1951	1961	2001
Population	18,687	21,543	22,475	20,546	18,736	19,057	19,262	28,505
Source: A Vision of Britain through Time

== Present day ==
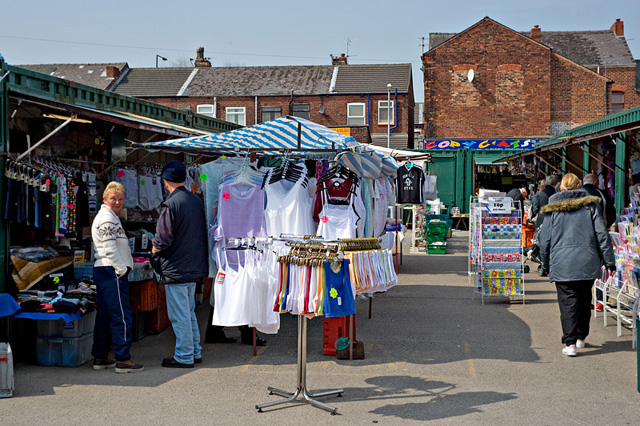
Ashton Market, Ashton-in-Makerfield

A market is held on the market square off Garswood Street on Tuesdays and Saturdays.

Ashton's local semi-pro football clubs are Ashton Athletic and Ashton Town. Garswood United is also nearby.

Crompton's, the hinge and fasteners making factory in Ashton-in-Makerfield, has closed and is now demolished. A shopping centre called the Gerard Centre now stands in its place. The Hingemaker's Arms public house, on Heath Road, is the only one in the world known to carry that name.

The site now occupied by Byrchall and St Edmund Arrowsmith high schools was the location of a Second World War POW camp, Camp 50.

== Education ==
Ashton-in-Makerfield has three secondary schools: Cansfield High School; Byrchall High School and St Edmund Arrowsmith Catholic High School.

In November 2008, Wigan council released proposals to merge Cansfield High and Byrchall High into one school. These proposals were refused, and the schools remain separate, with Cansfield situated near to Bryn and Byrchall near to Haydock, neighbouring St Edmund Arrowsmith.

In 2021, it was announced that Byrchall had been selected to be 1 of 50 schools chosen across the UK to be rebuilt. The new build will be situated on the front field, and will feature facilities such as a performing arts wing, which the old school did not have. This is an update that has been long-awaited, as the school is believed to have stayed almost identical to when it first opened in 1978, after moving from the grounds of Ashton Grammar School, which was founded in 1588, over 4 centuries ago. In 2007, the school was announced to be a specialist Maths and Computing College, increasing student admissions and increasing the population of the school, hence the decision to rebuild, as the current build is believed to be too small for purpose at this point in time.

== Media ==
Local news and television programmes are provided by BBC North West and ITV Granada. Television signals are received from the Winter Hill TV transmitter.

The town is served by both BBC Radio Manchester and BBC Radio Merseyside. Other radio stations including Heart North West, Smooth North West, Greatest Hits Radio Wigan & St Helens and Capital Manchester and Lancashire.

Local newspapers are Wigan Evening Post and Manchester Evening News.

== Notable people ==
People either born or brought up in Ashton-in-Makerfield, or have had some significant connection with the town during their life, include:

- Thomas Penswick (1772–1836), a Roman Catholic bishop, the Apostolic Vicariate of the Northern District (England), from 1831 to 1836.
- Stephen Walsh (1859–1929), miner, trade unionist, politician, MP & minister. MP for Ince 1906-1929 and Secretary of State for War in 1924
- William Kenealy (1886–1915), a colour sergeant in the Royal Irish Regiment, recipient of the Victoria Cross
- Joe Gormley (1917–1993), president of the National Union of Mineworkers, 1971–1982
- Lemn Sissay (born 1967), BAFTA-nominated writer and broadcaster, has been a guest on BBC One's Have I Got News for You
- Sir Ian McCartney (born 1951), politician, MP for Makerfield from 1987 to 2010.
- Kym Marsh (born 1976), actress and member of the band Hear'Say and played Michelle Connor in Coronation Street

=== Sport ===
- Bob Kelly (1893–1969), footballer, played 633 games, including 277 for Burnley and 14 for England
- James Tyldesley (1889–1923), cricketer who played 116 First-class cricket matches
- Harold Wood (1902–1975), marathon runner at the 1928 Summer Olympics
- Arthur Welsby (1902–1980), footballer who played over 370 games starting with 220 with Wigan Borough
- Les Hart (1917–1996), footballer and football manager, played 280 games for Bury Football Club. In 2010 Bury F.C. renamed their south stand at Gigg Lane, the Les Hart Stand in his honour.
- John Bramwell (born 1937), footballer, has played about 300 games
- June Croft (born 1963), swimmer, won silver and bronze medals in the 1980 & 1984 Summer Olympics respectively
- Helen Don-Duncan (1981–2023), bronze medallist at the 1998 Commonwealth Games and competed at the 2000 Summer Olympics
- Steve Maden (born 1982), former rugby league player who played 271 games, including 167 with Leigh Leopards
- Chris Melling (born 1984), former rugby league player who played 173 games including 163 for Harlequins RL
- Rhys Bennett (born 1991), footballer, has played about 300 games, including two spells at Rochdale

== See also ==
- List of mining disasters in Lancashire
- Listed buildings in Ashton-in-Makerfield
