= Golborne High School =

Location
- Lowton Road; Golborne, Greater Manchester, WA3 3EL; United Kingdom; 53.48084°N 2.58716°W

Information
- Type: Foundation school
- Motto: Where pupils believe, they can achieve.
- Established: 1954
- Local authority: Wigan
- Department for Education URN: 106525 Tables
- Ofsted: Reports
- Gender: Coeducational
- Age: 11 to 16
- Enrolment: approx. 1,144
- Houses: Fonteyn; Lennon; Picasso; Shakespeare; Westwood
- Colour: Purple
- Website: https://www.golbornehigh.wigan.sch.uk/

Golborne High School is a coeducational foundation secondary school located in Golborne, Metropolitan Borough of Wigan, England.

== History ==
The oldest part of the school was opened in January 1954. This comprised the main corridor, its classrooms, and the gymnasium. The school admitted only girls and was called the Girls' Secondary Modern School. In 1967, boys were admitted for the first time, having previously been educated at what later became Golborne County Junior School. In 1969, Golborne became a comprehensive school. New additions to the building included the Sports Hall (originally intended to be a swimming pool) and the RoSLA Block, where sixth form students were educated - Golborne High has since ceased education of sixth form students. The RoSLA block is now known as the 'C-Block'. Golborne had plans by Wigan Council approved for an expansion and, quote, a 'new school'. These plans have yet to be completed, and Golborne have opened a temporary block, known as the 'H-Block'.

The school badge comprises a green shield quartered by the red cross of St George of England. In each quarter of the shield are symbols representing industries in the area: the black diamond representing coal mining, the crossed shuttles representing the weaving industry, and a sheaf of wheat symbolising local agriculture. The fourth symbol is the red rose of Lancashire, although the school now technically lies in Greater Manchester following local government reorganisation in 1974.

Since that time, there have been three major changes to the status of the school:

- In 1989, the sixth form closed, with the final year taking their examinations in 1990, and the school lost its comprehensive status and became Golborne High.
- In 2007, it became a College of Visual Arts.
- In 2010, it became a trust school under the umbrella of the newly formed Golborne and Lowton Co-operative Learning Partnership.

The school took second place in a Salter's Festival of Chemistry contest. In July 2007, Golborne sent representatives to a youth summit to press for greater adult understanding of youth issues.

In September 2007, the school was selected to host a display of lunar rock samples, which students were allowed to handle.

Two students reached the national final of a robot-building competition in Milton Keynes, having won the heats of the contest at Salford University. Other students had their artwork exhibited on the Saatchi Gallery's online platform.

In December 2008, Sir Ian McKellen, who was brought up in Wigan, visited the school to support the school's anti-bullying campaign.

Golborne was recognised as one of 100 schools with the largest increase in performance from 2002 to 2004, based on participation in GCSE examinations. The school continued to improve and, in 2009, achieved its best-ever results, with 51% of students achieving five good GCSE passes, including English and mathematics.

Current crest used at Golborne High School

As early as 2004, the school had been pursuing arts school status, which would provide a more focused curriculum enhanced with state-of-the-art equipment. In September 2007, the school became a College of Visual Arts. A digital photography suite was subsequently opened, intended not only for school use but also for community groups.

== Houses ==
The school is divided into five houses the names of which are derived from the names of famous artists in several fields:

- Fonteyn – after Margot Fonteyn the ballerina
- Lennon – after John Lennon the Liverpool songwriter and member of The Beatles
- Picasso – after Pablo Picasso the artist
- Shakespeare – after William Shakespeare the playwright
- Westwood – after Vivienne Westwood the fashion designer
