= St Thomas' Church, Ashton-in-Makerfield =

Coordinates: 53.4857°N 2.6389°W

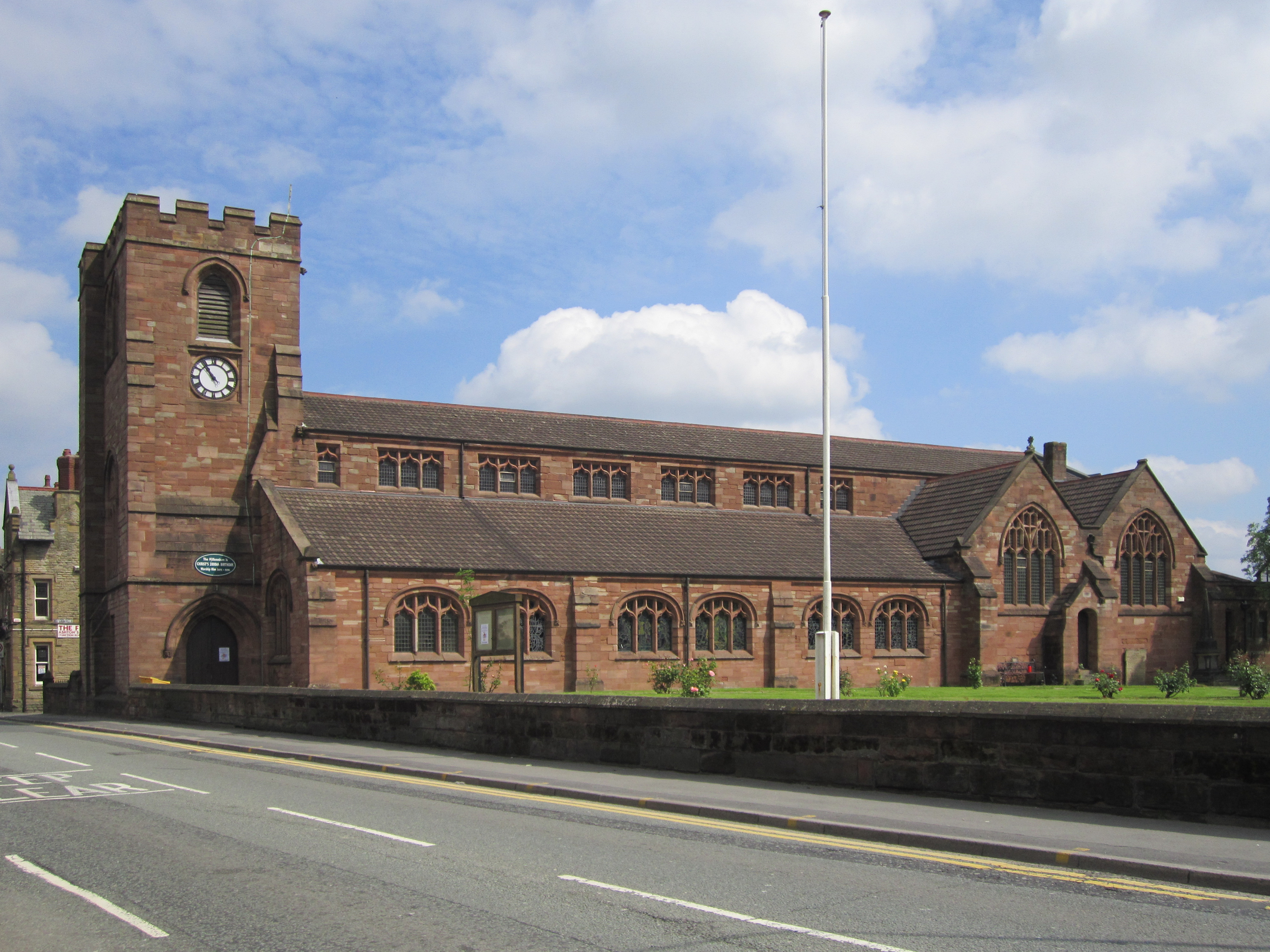
- St Thomas' Church, Ashton-in-Makerfield, from the south

- Location in Greater Manchester
- OS grid reference: SJ 577,990
- Location: Warrington Road, Ashton-in-Makerfield, Greater Manchester
- Country: England
- Denomination: Anglican
- Website: St Thomas, Ashton-in-Makerfield

History
- Status: Parish church
- Consecrated: 6 July 1893

Architecture
- Functional status: Active
- Heritage designation: Grade II
- Designated: 7 December 1966
- Architect(s): F. H. Oldham, Henry Paley
- Architectural type: Church
- Style: Gothic Revival
- Groundbreaking: 1891
- Completed: 1930

Specifications
- Materials: Stone

Administration
- Province: York
- Diocese: Liverpool
- Archdeaconry: Warrington
- Deanery: Wigan
- Parish: St Thomas, Ashton-in-Makerfield

Clergy
- Vicar: Revd Sandra Jones

St Thomas' Church is in Warrington Road, Ashton-in-Makerfield, Greater Manchester, England. It is an active Anglican parish church in the deanery of Wigan, the archdeaconry of Warrington, and the diocese of Liverpool. Its benefice is united with that of St Luke, Stubshaw Cross. The church is recorded in the National Heritage List for England as a designated Grade II listed building.

== History ==
A chapel of ease to St Oswald, Winwick is recorded on the site in 1515; this chapel was rebuilt in 1714. The new chapel, which had a cruciform plan, was consecrated in 1746. It was enlarged in 1782, and again in 1815. This chapel was in Georgian style. The present church was built in 1891–93, and was designed by F. H. Oldham of Manchester, providing seating for about 500 people. The church was consecrated on 6 July 1893 by the Rt Revd J. C. Ryle, Bishop of Liverpool. In 1929–30 the Lancaster architect Henry Paley of Austin and Paley added a new vestry at a cost of £506 (equivalent to £66,000). The tower originally had a saddleback roof, but this was removed in the 1960s.

== Architecture ==
=== Exterior ===
The church is constructed in stone with a concrete tile roof. Its plan consists of three-bay nave with a clerestory, north and south aisles, a chancel with a north organ chamber, vestries to the south and east, and a west tower. The tower has entrances on the north and south sides, and a four-light west window containing Perpendicular tracery. At the northwest corner is a stair turret. The bell openings are louvred, and paired on the east and west sides; there are clock faces on three sides. The parapet is embattled, with a gargoyle on the east side. Along the sides of the south aisle are pairs of three-light windows, and along the north side the windows have one or two lights. The clerestory windows mainly have three lights. The south vestry has three-light windows, the east window of the chancel has seven lights, and its north window has three lights. The east vestry window is straight-headed with three lights. The organ chamber has a three-light window and a rose window.

=== Interior ===
Inside the church the arcades are carried on octagonal piers without capitals. The chancel arch is decorated with Tudor roses. On the north side of the chancel is a piscina. Removed from the older church are a chandelier, the organ case of 1826, the Royal arms of William IV, and monuments dating back to the 18th century. Most of the stained glass is by A. L. Moore, including the east window of 1897, which celebrates Queen Victoria's Diamond Jubilee. The original two-manual pipe organ in the older church was made in 1826 by Bewsher and Fleetwood of Liverpool. It was refurbished in 1890 by Wadsworth of Manchester. In 1905 it was moved into the new church and rebuilt by Charles Whiteley of Chester. In 1962 it was moved from its position on the north side of the chancel to a north chapel by Whitely, and in 1988 the organ was refurbished by George Sixsmith.

== External features ==
The primary churchyard contains the war graves of eight service personnel of the First World War and three of the Second World War, and the churchyard extension, in Heath Lane, those of ten service personnel of the First World War and four of the Second World War.

== See also ==
- Listed buildings in Ashton-in-Makerfield
- List of churches in Greater Manchester
- List of ecclesiastical works by Austin and Paley (1916–44)
