= Deanery High School =

The Deanery Church of England High School and Sixth Form

Location
- Frog Lane; Wigan, Greater Manchester, WN1 1HQ; Scotland; 53.5483°N 2.6381°W

Information
- Type: Voluntary aided school
- Motto: Work hard, be kind, make a difference
- Religious affiliation: Church of England
- Established: 1977
- Local authority: Wigan
- Department for Education URN: 106534 Tables
- Headteacher: Martin Wood
- Gender: Coeducational
- Age: 11 to 19
- Enrolment: 1425
- Colours: Navy Blue and Gray
- Website: https://www.deanery.wigan.sch.uk/

The Deanery Church of England High School and Sixth Form College is a coeducational secondary school and sixth form located in Wigan, Greater Manchester, England. It is a Church of England voluntary aided school.

The school's campus is located near the town centre, very close to Wigan bus station and the main Royal Mail sorting office.

== History ==
The school opened in 1971 as a successor to All Saints School, which was founded in 1931. It was previously housed mainly in former All Saints buildings; however, starting in summer 2015 most of these old buildings were demolished in order to make way for a new £20 million build, funded under the Government's Priority Schools' Building Programme (PSBP). The classrooms, offices and other facilities once housed in the now demolished buildings were relocated into temporary buildings at the rear of the school near its all-weather pitch, with the first new buildings to be occupied in September 2017, after which the rest of the old buildings were to be demolished. The school's sports hall was also renovated, with the classrooms in that building, formerly used for English, now housing a new music department, featuring two larger classrooms, a recording studio, an office for the heads of the performing arts and PE departments and a staff work room for the two departments.

== Academics ==
The Deanery High School has a 6th Form College, offering A-Levels as well as Level 2 and 3 BTEC courses. Until 2017, the school offered Latin at GCSE level; it had previously also been an A-Level subject.

The 2022 OFSTED report said the school is "good".

== Headteachers ==
- John Sharples, 1971–1987
- Richard Williams, 1987–1997
- Roger Mallows, 1997–2007
- John Whiteley (acting), 2005–2006
- Janice Rowlands (acting), 2008-2009
- Stephen Brierley, 2009–2013
- Janice Rowlands, 2013–2019
- Martin Wood, 2019–present

== Former students ==
- Chris Hill, Warrington Wolves and England rugby league player
- Jon Pollock, wheelchair basketballer, medallist at the Summer Paralympic Games
