= St Wilfrid's Catholic High School, North Featherstone =

Academy in England, West Yorkshire, England

St Wilfrid's Catholic High School, A Voluntary Academy

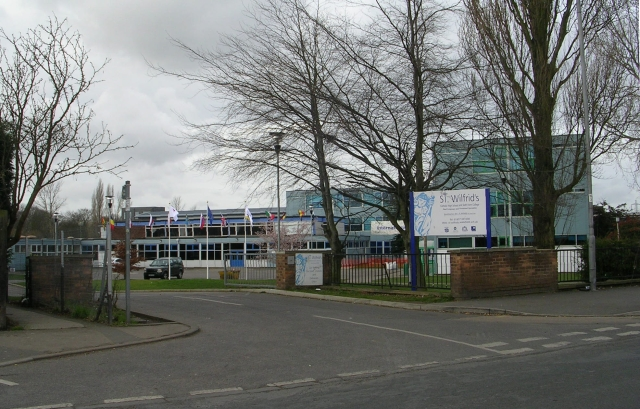

Location
- Cutsyke Road; Featherstone, West Yorkshire, WF7 6BD; England; 53.69670°N 1.36317°W

Information
- Type: Academy
- Motto: Fidem Servavi (I have kept the faith)
- Religious affiliation: Roman Catholic
- Established: 1963
- School board: Bishop Konstant Catholic Academy Trust
- Local authority: City of Wakefield
- Department for Education URN: 138951 Tables
- Ofsted: Reports
- Chair of Governors: Karen Gayles
- Headteacher: Philip Dore
- Staff: 318
- Age: 11 to 18
- Enrolment: 1,525 pupils
- Houses: Briant, Clitherow, Fisher, Gwynn, Howard, Kirby, More, Newman, Postgate and Ward
- Colours: Blue and Gold
- Website: www.st-wilfrids.bkcat.co.uk

St Wilfrid's Catholic High School is a mixed secondary school and sixth form with academy status located in Featherstone, West Yorkshire, England. It has Vocational specialisms.

== School history and overview ==
St Wilfrid's was opened in 1963. In 1998, St Wilfrid's became a Language College which offered six languages including French, Spanish, German, Russian, Italian and Japanese. These courses have been discontinued in a bid to reduce costs.

The most recent OfSTED and Section 48 Religious Education inspection which identified the school as "friendly school where pupils are supported by caring staff who are focused on helping them to succeed". St. Wilfrid's was awarded a second specialism as a Vocational specialist college which came into effect in September 2006. Courses on offer to pupils include: Health & Social care, Travel and Tourism, Performing Arts (Dance, Singing and Drama), IT for Practitioners, NVQ in European languages, NVQ Hairdressing, CISCO IT networking and Construction.

The school became an academy in November 2012. The school had its 50th birthday celebration in October 2013.

The school has had various leadership, uniform and management issues in the past.

The school has launched a theatrical production every year for approximately 20 years; the plays and musicals always draw in audiences of local families and the parents of pupils. The most recent of these productions was "Musicals Through the Ages" which was performed on 7 and 8 February 2023. They also have a "St Wilfrid's Day" once per year (stopped during the Coronavirus Pandemic, later resumed since 2022 as normal) to celebrate and gather students together.

== Awards ==
The school has achieved several national awards including the Schools Curriculum Award, Sportsmark Award, the School Achievement Award given in 2002 and 2003 for outstanding improvements in GCSE results. The Arts Council Artsmark Silver award, the British Council International School Award for outstanding global links, the Ramseys Award given to the school with the best global video-conferencing facilities and programme, as well as the Investors in People Award recognising excellence in training and development for all teaching and non-teaching staff have also been earned. In February 2007 the school was awarded the Arts Council Artsmark Gold award. In 2021 the school was awarded again for their effort to help the climate and make the school more eco friendly.

== Vocational specialisms ==
In 2006 the school was awarded a second specialism as a Vocational College. Vocational specialism means that the school offers a distinctive range of courses that provide opportunities for pupils to gain qualifications. All vocational courses follow a curriculum developed by exam boards with the help of employers. Wherever possible, links to the world of employment are emphasised; this may be visiting speakers, work placements, visits or real work. This means that in most cases pupils will be occupationally competent to carry out a job in their chosen career.

== A-Level and BTEC available courses ==
- Biology (A Level)
- Business (A Level)
- Chemistry (A Level)
- English Language (A Level)
- English Literature (A Level)
- Extended Project (A Level)
- Fine Art (A Level)
- Geography (A Level)
- History (A Level)
- Mathematics (A Level)
- Further Mathematics (A Level)
- Media (A Level)
- Photography (A Level)
- Physical Education (A Level)
- Physics (A Level)
- Psychology (A Level)
- Religious Studies (A Level)
- Sociology (A Level)
- Health and Social Care (BTEC Extended Diploma)
- Applied Sciences (BTEC Extended Certificate and Diploma)

== Language curriculum ==
The curriculum includes three languages, French, German and Spanish, two of which are taught at key stage 3 as first and second languages. In key stage 4 the department teaches three languages at GCSE level.

NVQ level 1 language units qualification was introduced into the teaching of the department in September 2005. NVQ Level 2 qualifications were introduced in September 2006.

At A2 level, French, German, Spanish and Italian are no longer taught.
