= Cansfield High School =

Coordinates: 53.4936°N 2.6447°W

Location
- Old Road; Ashton-in-Makerfield; Wigan, Greater Manchester, WN4 9TP; England

Information
- Type: Community school
- Motto: Achieving Excellence Together
- Local authority: Wigan
- Department for Education URN: 106521 Tables
- Ofsted: Reports
- Head teacher: Nicola Daniels
- Gender: Coeducational
- Age: 11 to 16
- Enrolment: 987
- Colours: Navy Blue & White
- Website: https://www.cansfield.wigan.sch.uk/

Cansfield High School is a coeducational secondary school located in the Ashton-in-Makerfield area of the Metropolitan Borough of Wigan, Greater Manchester, England.

== Past headmasters ==
- To 1974 : Mr S Price
- 1974-1988: Mr C A Brand
- 1988-1990: Acting headteachers Mr S Wall and Mr D Parfitt
- 1990-1995: Mrs H G Gregory
- 1995-2018: Mr M Southworth
- 2018–2023: Dr. Geoff Baker
- 2023–Present: Mrs N Daniels
