= Richard Herst =

English Roman Catholic martyr

Blessed Richard Herst

Martyr
- Born: Broughton, near Preston, Lancashire, England
- Died: 29 August 1628; Lancaster, England
- Beatified: 15 December 1929 by Pope Pius XI
- Feast: 29 August
- Attributes: holding an ear of wheat, or a lamb

Richard Herst (Hurst) (died 29 August 1628) was an English Roman Catholic recusant layman. He is a Catholic martyr, beatified in 1929.

== Life ==
Herst is thought to have been born at Broughton, near Preston, Lancashire, England, where he was a well-to-do yeoman, farming his own land. He was arrested while out ploughing his fields. As he was a recusant, Norcross, a pursuivant, was sent by the Bishop of Chester to arrest him. The pursuivants had a fracas with Hurst's servants, in the course of which one of the pursuivant's men, by name Dewhurst, in running over a ploughed field, fell and broke his leg. The wound mortified and proved fatal, and before his death Dewhurst made a solemn oath that his injury was the result of an accident. Nevertheless Hurst was indicted for murder, as the government wished at that time to make severe examples of recusants.

Through Hurst's friends a petition was sent to King Charles I of England, also supported by Queen Henrietta Maria. No evidence contradicting Dewhurst's dying declaration having been adduced, the jury were unwilling to convict; but the foreman of the jury was told by the judge, in the house of the latter, that the government was determined to get a conviction, that a murder had been committed, and that the jury must bring in a verdict of guilty. Hurst was convicted and sentenced to death; on the next day, being commanded to hear a sermon at the Anglican church, he refused and was dragged by the legs for some distance to the church, where he put his fingers in his ears so as not to hear the sermon.

At the gallows he was informed that his life would be spared if he would swear allegiance to the king, but as the oath contained passages to which he objected, he refused and was at once executed. He was executed at Lancaster.
