= Edmund Arrowsmith =

English Jesuit and saint (c.1585–1628)

Saint Edmund Arrowsmith SJ
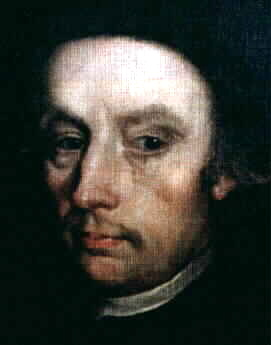

Martyr
- Born: c. 1585; Haydock, England
- Died: 28 August 1628 (aged 42 - 43); Lancaster, England
- Venerated in: Roman Catholic Church
- Beatified: 15 December 1929 by Pope Pius XI
- Canonized: 25 October 1970 by Pope Paul VI
- Major shrine: Catholic Church of St Oswald and St Edmund Arrowsmith, Ashton-in-Makerfield, England
- Feast: 28 August (individual); 7 August (one of the Lancaster Martyrs); 25 October (together with Forty Martyrs of England and Wales); 29 October (one of the Douai Martyrs)
- Attributes: crucifix, martyr's palm, noose on neck, glowing right hand
- Patronage: Lancaster

Edmund Arrowsmith, SJ (c. 1585 – 28 August 1628) was one of the Forty Martyrs of England and Wales of the Catholic Church. The main source of information on Arrowsmith is a contemporary account written by an eyewitness and published a short time after his death. This document, conforming to the ancient style of the "Acts of martyrs" includes the story of the execution of another 17th-century recusant martyr, Richard Herst.

== Life ==
Edmund Arrowsmith was born at Haydock, Lancashire, England, in 1585, the eldest child of Robert Arrowsmith, a yeoman farmer, who had served in Sir William Stanley's regiment which fought for Spain in the Low Countries. His mother was Margery Gerard, a member of the Lancashire Gerard family. Among his mother's relations was the priest John Gerard, who wrote The Diary of an Elizabethan Priest, as well as another martyr, Miles Gerard. He was baptised Brian, but always used his confirmation name of Edmund, after an uncle who trained English priests in France. The family was constantly harassed for its adherence to Roman Catholicism. One of his grandfathers died a confessor in prison. On one occasion, as a child, he was left shivering in his night-clothes by the pursuivants, who carried his parents off to Lancaster jail; he and his three siblings were cared for by neighbours.

== Education ==
In 1605, at the age of twenty, Arrowsmith left England and went to the English College, Douai, to study for the priesthood. He was soon forced to return to England due to ill health, but recovered and returned to Douai in 1607.

== Life as a priest ==
He was ordained in Arras on 9 December 1612, and sent on the English mission a year later. He ministered to the Catholics of Lancashire without incident until around 1622, when he was arrested and questioned by the Anglican Bishop of Chester. Arrowsmith was released when King James I of England ordered an amnesty for all arrested priests, in furtherance of negotiations to arrange a Spanish marriage for his son Prince Charles. Arrowsmith joined the Jesuits in 1624.

In the summer of 1628, Arrowsmith was reportedly betrayed by a man named Holden, who denounced him to the authorities. Arrowsmith ministered to Catholics of Lancashire at the still-standing Arrowsmith House, located in Gregson Lane before being arrested and questioned on Brindle Moss where his horse refused to jump a ditch. He was convicted of being a Catholic priest in England. He was sentenced to death, and hanged, drawn and quartered at Lancaster on 28 August 1628. His final confession was heard by John Southworth, who was imprisoned along with Arrowsmith.

== Veneration ==
Edmund Arrowsmith was beatified in 1929. In 1970, he was canonized as one of the Forty Martyrs of England and Wales by Pope Paul VI. The latest official edition of the Roman Martyrology commemorates the martyr under the date of 28 August. Since this date coincides with the feastday of St Augustine of Hippo, Edmund Arrowsmith's is transferred in local calendars to other suitable dates: in the Diocese of Lancaster he is celebrated as one of the Lancashire Martyrs, whose feast is kept throughout the diocese on 7 August each year. He is also now commemorated in the National Calendar for England on 4 May, together with all the beatified and canonized English Martyrs.

The martyr's hand was preserved and kept by the Arrowsmith family as a relic and it now rests in the Catholic Church of St Oswald and St Edmund Arrowsmith, Ashton-in-Makerfield. Stonyhurst College retains the small trunk of vestments and equipment which he carried from house to house.

St Edmund Arrowsmith Catholic High School is located in Ashton-in-Makerfield, Greater Manchester, England. Ironically he was educated at what is now The Byrchall high school which shares the same grounds and has a red hand as part of its heraldry. There is also St Edmund Arrowsmith Catholic Academy in Whiston, Merseyside.
