= St John Fisher Catholic High School, Wigan =

St John Fisher Catholic High School

Location
- Baytree Road; Wigan, Greater Manchester, WN6 7RN; England; 53°33′28″N 2°39′11″W

Information
- Type: Voluntary aided comprehensive
- Motto: "Quod Bonum Est Tenete"
- Religious affiliation: Roman Catholic
- Established: 1950
- Local authority: Wigan
- Department for Education URN: 106535 Tables
- Ofsted: Reports
- Chairman of Governors: Dave Mallin
- Headteacher: Alison Rigby
- Gender: Mixed
- Age: 11 to 16
- Enrolment: c. 1000
- Website: http://www.sjfhs.co.uk/

St John Fisher Catholic High School is a mixed comprehensive secondary school in Wigan, Greater Manchester, England. It is named after the Catholic martyr John Fisher.

== Academics ==
The schools performs well in league tables compared with other local schools. It was among the top five performing schools in the Wigan LEA in the 2011 GCSEs.

== Sport ==
The school has been associated with rugby league since the 1970s. In the late 1990s and early 2000s, one year's team went unbeaten for five years, earning a place in the Guinness Book of Records. The school has produced notable alumni, including Shaun Edwards, the late Billy Joe Edwards, Sean Gleeson and Chris Ashton.

== Reconstruction ==
In February 2021, it was announced that the school would be rebuilt under the DfE Schools Rebuild Programme. Construction began in Summer 2022, and as of Spring 2025 the main block and the sports hall is now open to staff and students.

== Notable former pupils ==
- Mike Gregory (b. 1964), rugby league international
- Chris Joynt (b. 1971), rugby league international
- Mick Cassidy (b. 1973), rugby league international
- Stephen Wild (b. 1981), rugby league international
- Joel Tomkins (b. 1987), rugby league international
- Sam Tomkins (b. 1989), rugby league international
- Liam Farrell (b. 1990), rugby league international
- Owen Farrell (b. 1991), rugby union international
