= St Edmund Arrowsmith Catholic High School, Ashton-in-Makerfield =

St Edmund Arrowsmith Catholic High School

Location
- Rookery Avenue; Ashton-in-Makerfield, Greater Manchester, WN4 9PF; England; 53.4824°N 2.6403°W

Information
- Type: Voluntary aided school
- Religious affiliation: Roman Catholic
- Local authority: Wigan
- Department for Education URN: 106540 Tables
- Ofsted: Reports
- Head teacher: Mark Dumican
- Gender: Coeducational
- Age: 11 to 16
- Website: http://www.arrowsmith.wigan.sch.uk/

St Edmund Arrowsmith Catholic High School is a centre of secondary education in Ashton-in-Makerfield in the Metropolitan Borough of Wigan, Greater Manchester, England. It has around 1200 pupils and is a Leading Edge school. It is also the first Secondary School in the Wigan Borough to receive the Green Flag Award.

It is in the Catholic parish of St Oswald's with most pupils coming from Haydock English Martyrs Catholic Primary School Haydock, Sacred Heart Catholic Primary School, Hindley Green, St Oswald's Catholic Primary School, Ashton, St Benedicts Catholic Primary School, Hindley, Holy Family Catholic Academy, Platt Bridge, and other schools in the boroughs of Wigan and St Helens. Mr. Dumican is the headmaster of the school. The school opened on 21 August 1961 and was formerly known as 'Blessed Edmund Arrowsmith.' It celebrated its Golden Jubilee of 50 years at a mass held at the Liverpool Cathedral on 29 June 2011.

Edmund Arrowsmith (c. 1585 – 28 August 1628) was canonised in 1970 as one of the Forty Martyrs of England and Wales. He was born in Haydock, Lancashire.

== Notable former pupils ==
- Jennifer James (b. 1977) - actress, Coronation Street
- David McIntosh (b. 1985) - television personality, Gladiators star Tornado.
- Joe Burgess (b. 1994) - rugby league player, Wigan Warriors
- Oliver Gildart (b. 1996) - rugby league player, Hull Kingston Rovers
- Luke Thompson - rugby league player, St Helens R.F.C.
