= List of settlements in Greater Manchester by population =

The 26 largest settlements of the county of Greater Manchester, with cities in bold, district centres in yellow, and key towns and areas in white.

This is a list of settlements in Greater Manchester by population based on the results of the 2011 census. The next United Kingdom census will take place in 2021. In 2011, there were 61 built-up area subdivisions with 5,000 or more inhabitants in Greater Manchester, shown in the table below.

== Administrative boundaries ==

Table taken from the Greater Manchester article:

Metropolitan county	Metropolitan district		Centre of administration	Other components
Greater Manchester	1	Manchester	Manchester (City Centre)	Blackley, Burnage, Cheetham Hill, Chorlton-cum-Hardy, Didsbury, Ringway, Withington, Wythenshawe
Greater Manchester	2	Stockport	Stockport	Bramhall, Bredbury, Cheadle, Gatley, Hazel Grove, Marple, Reddish, Romiley
Greater Manchester	3	Tameside	Ashton-under-Lyne	Audenshaw, Denton, Droylsden, Dukinfield, Hyde, Longdendale, Mossley, Stalybridge
Greater Manchester	4	Oldham	Oldham	Chadderton, Shaw and Crompton, Failsworth, Lees, Royton, Saddleworth
Greater Manchester	5	Rochdale	Rochdale	Heywood, Littleborough, Middleton, Milnrow, Newhey, Wardle
Greater Manchester	6	Bury	Bury	Prestwich, Radcliffe, Ramsbottom, Tottington, Whitefield
Greater Manchester	7	Bolton	Bolton	Blackrod, Farnworth, Horwich, Kearsley, Little Lever, South Turton, Westhoughton
Greater Manchester	8	Wigan	Wigan	Abram, Ashton-in-Makerfield, Aspull, Astley, Atherton, Bryn, Golborne, Higher End, Hindley, Ince-in-Makerfield, Leigh, Orrell, Standish, Shevington, Tyldesley, Winstanley
Greater Manchester	9	Salford	Swinton	Eccles, Walkden, Worsley, Salford, Irlam, Pendlebury, Cadishead
Greater Manchester	10	Trafford	Stretford	Altrincham, Bowdon, Hale, Old Trafford, Sale, Urmston

== Population ranking ==
#	Settlement	Population	
#	Settlement	Census 2001	Census 2011
1	Manchester^{‡} ^{(see notes)}	405,300	510,746
2	Bolton	182,980	194,189
3	Sale	122,990	134,022
4	Rochdale	102,080	107,926
5	Stockport	106,170	105,878
6	Salford	88,460	103,886
7	Wigan	98,480	103,608
8	Oldham	103,544	96,555
9	Bury	74,540	77,211
10	Leigh/Atherton	65,980	70,542
11	Altrincham	46,460	52,419
12	Ashton-under-Lyne	43,240	45,198
13	Middleton	42,625	42,972
14	Urmston	41,263	41,825
15	Eccles	37,861	38,756
16	Denton	36,877	36,591
17	Chadderton	33,000	34,818
18	Romiley	34,926	34,696
19	Hyde	31,610	34,003
20	Radcliffe	28,960	29,950
21	Ashton-in-Makerfield	28,856	28,762
22	Heywood	28,330	28,205
23	Farnworth	25,677	26,939
24	Stretford	24,842	26,813
25	Stalybridge	24,900	26,482
26	Swinton	25,046	25,362
27	Hindley	22,920	24,497
28	Cheadle Hulme	24,495	24,362
29	Golborne	23,119	24,167
30	Droylsden	24,170	24,134
31	Westhoughton	22,190	24,126
32	Royton	23,670	23,812
33	Walkden	20,847	21,194
34	Gatley	20,583	20,997
35	Whitefield	20,877	20,975
36	Dukinfield	20,507	20,909
37	Irlam	19,020	19,933
38	Horwich	18,610	19,492
39	Hazel Grove	19,153	19,365
40	Failsworth	19,279	18,844
41	Shaw	19,335	18,815
42	Marple	18,742	18,241
43	Ramsbottom	17,900	17,872
44	Bramhall	17,747	17,436
45	Hale	15,316	16,624
46	Tyldesley	15,583	16,142
47	Standish	13,580	13,701
48	Cheadle	13,374	13,467
49	Uppermill	12,647	13,448
50	Lees	12,600	13,062
51	Little Lever	12,570	12,803
52	Littleborough	12,260	12,370
53	Ince-in-Makerfield	10,680	12,243
54	Kearsley	10,460	11,150
55	Mossley	9,710	10,772
56	Platt Bridge/Abram	9,010	10,315
57	Milnrow	9,896	10,015
58	Worsley	9,465	9,108
59	Partington	7,327	7,912
60	Shevington Vale/Appley Bridge^{†} (see notes below)	5,155	5,197
61	Shevington	5,292	5,114
62	Aspull	4,977	4,899
63	Hattersley	4,777	4,825
64	High Lane	4,772	4,608
65	Blackrod	4,975	4,548

Notes:

- ^{‡} Prestwich (Bury) included in count.
- ^{†} Shevington Vale merges into Appley Bridge which is in Lancashire, their population has been added to the ONS statistics.

== See also ==
- Greater Manchester
- Greater Manchester Built-up Area
