= Syd Farrimond =

English footballer (1940–2022)

Personal information
- Date of birth: 17 July 1940
- Place of birth: Hindley, Greater Manchester, Lancashire, England
- Date of death: 8 May 2022 (aged 81)
- Position: Left back

Senior career*
Years	Team	Apps	(Gls)
1958–1970	Bolton Wanderers	404	(1)
1970–1974	Tranmere Rovers	134	(0)
1974–1976	Halifax Town	0	(0)
- * Club domestic league appearances and goals

Syd Farrimond (17 July 1940 – 8 May 2022) was an English footballer who played as a left back for Bolton Wanderers, Tranmere Rovers and Halifax Town. He made 153 appearances for Tranmere, of which 134 were in the Football League.

Farrimond died on 8 May 2022, at the age of 81, due to complications from dementia.
