= Greater Manchester Built-up Area =

Conurbation in England

- Conurbation
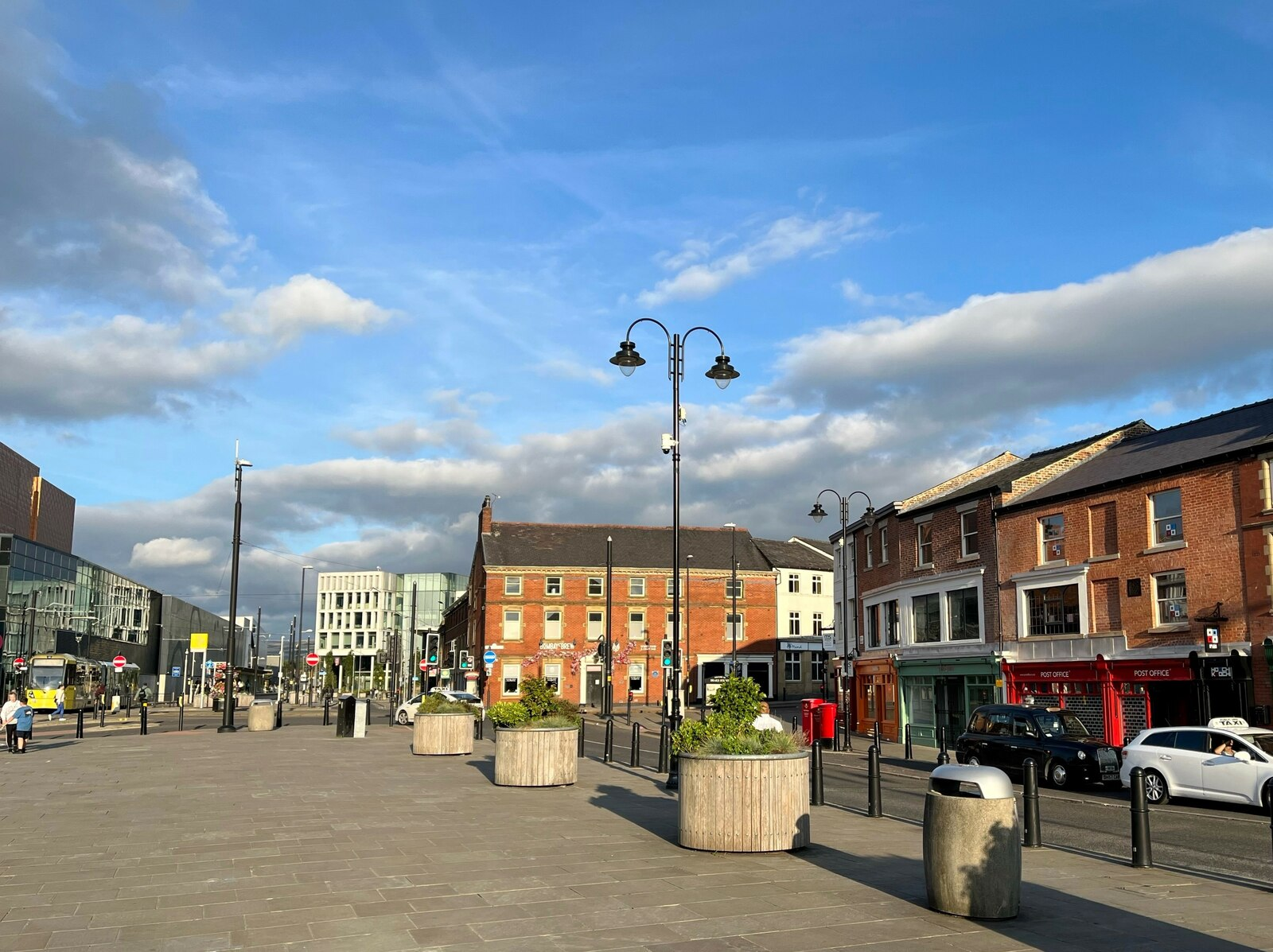
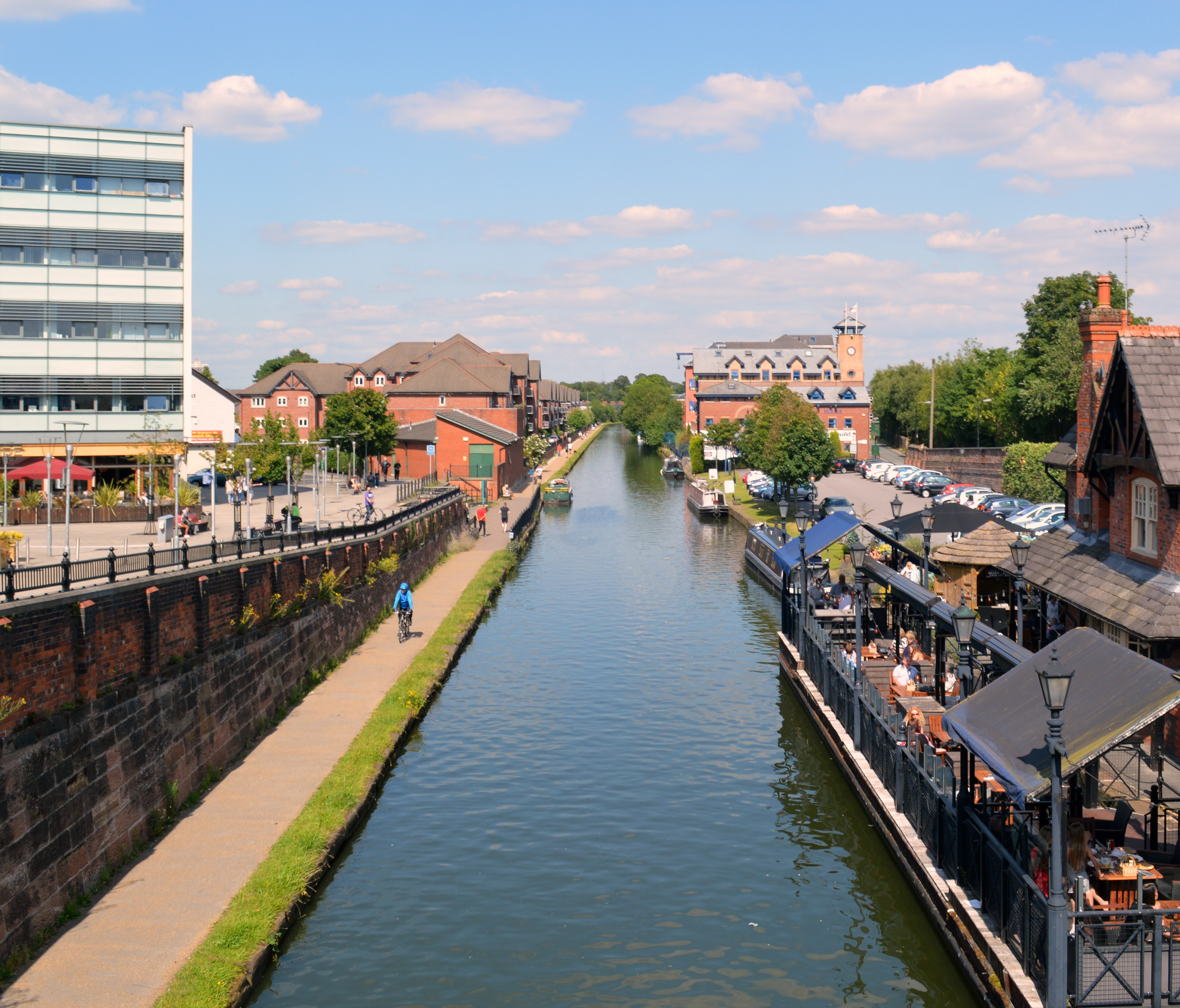
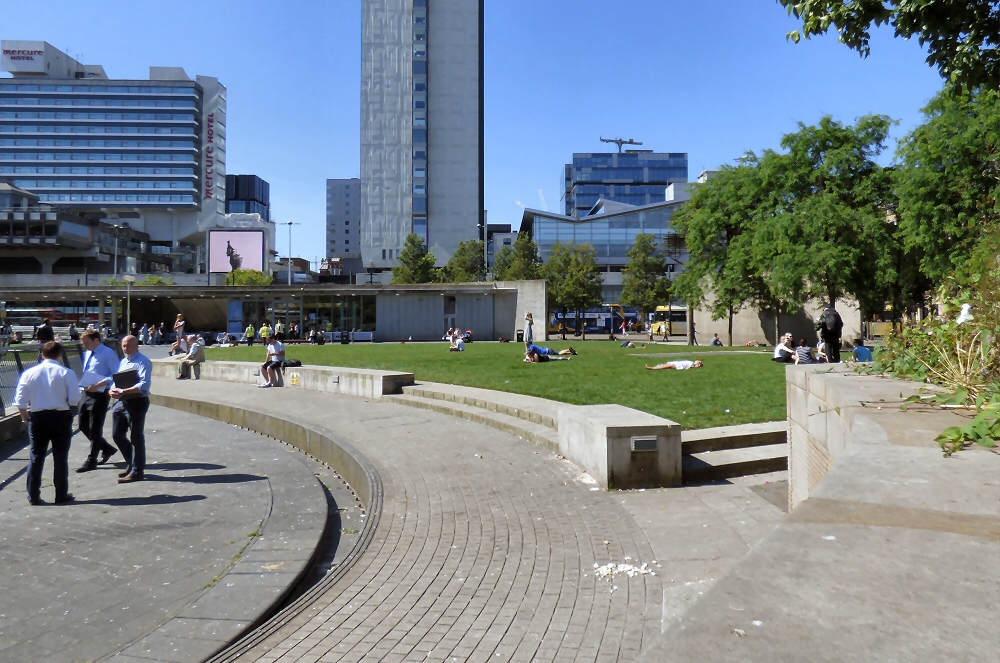
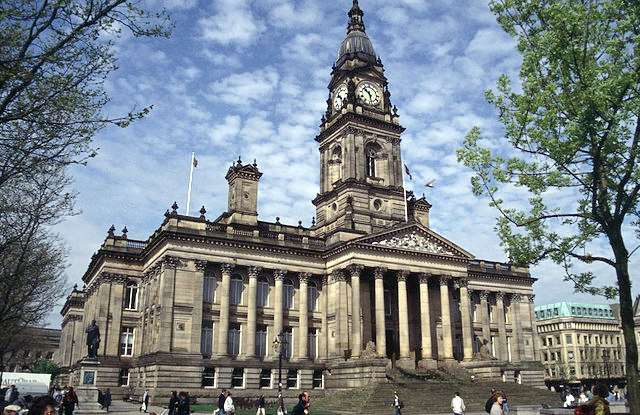
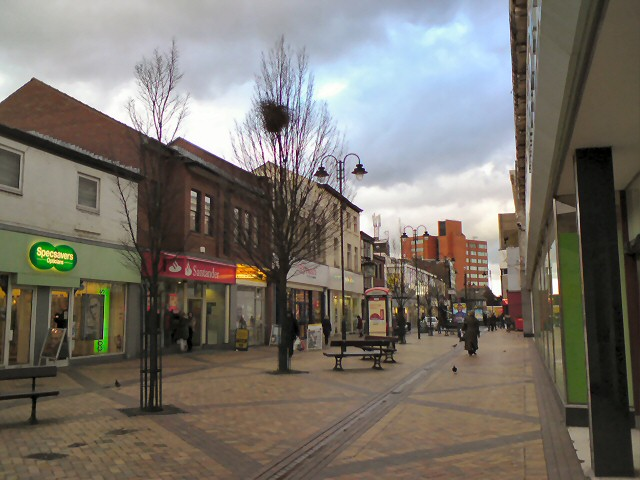
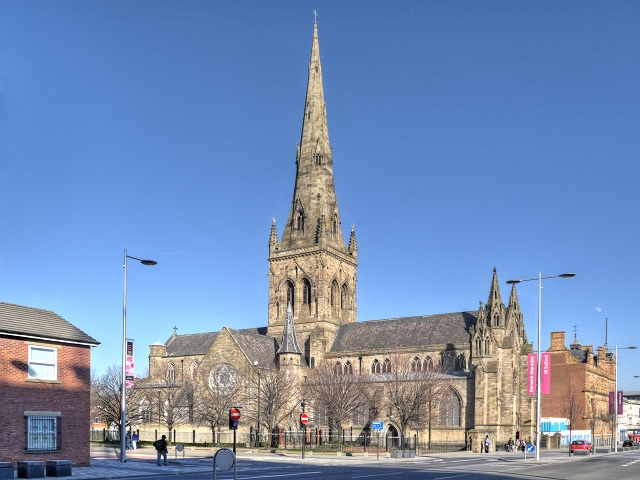
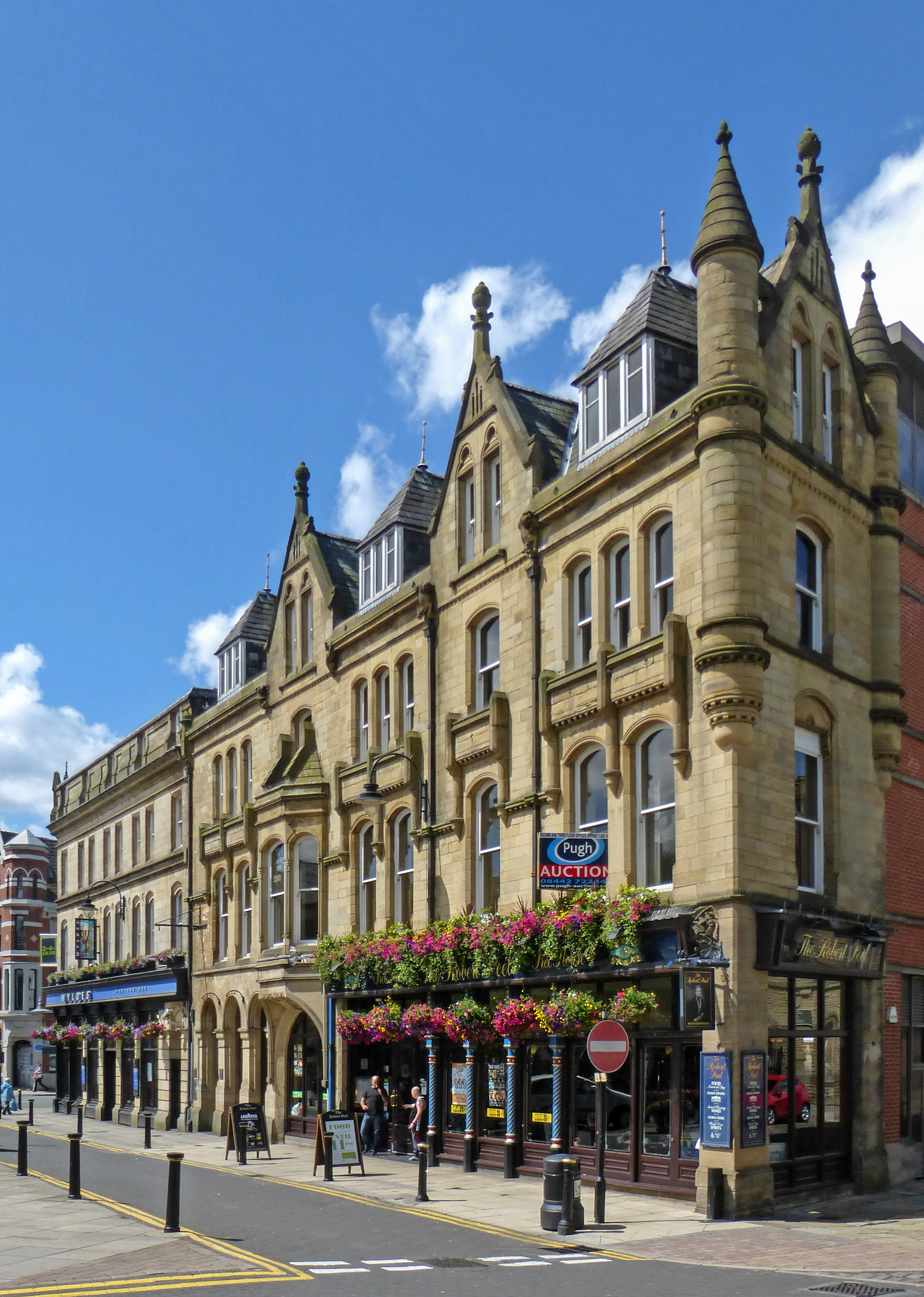
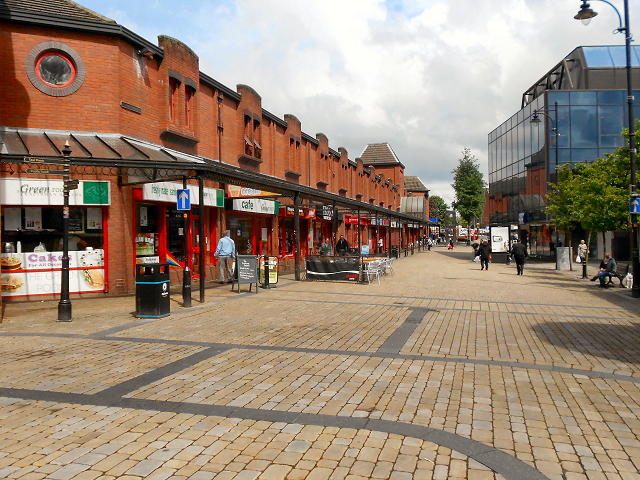
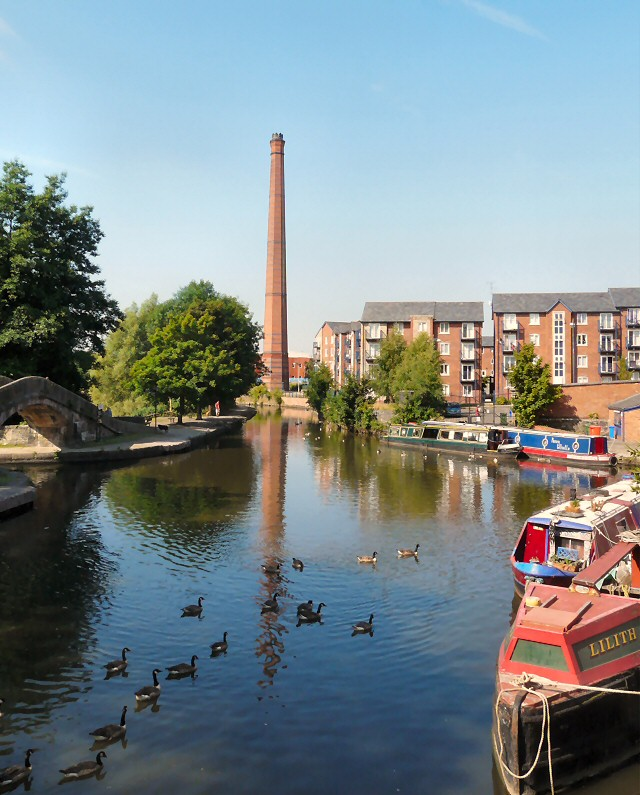
- Left to right: Rochdale and Sale; Manchester and Bolton; Stockport and Salford; Bury, Oldham and Ashton-under-Lyne

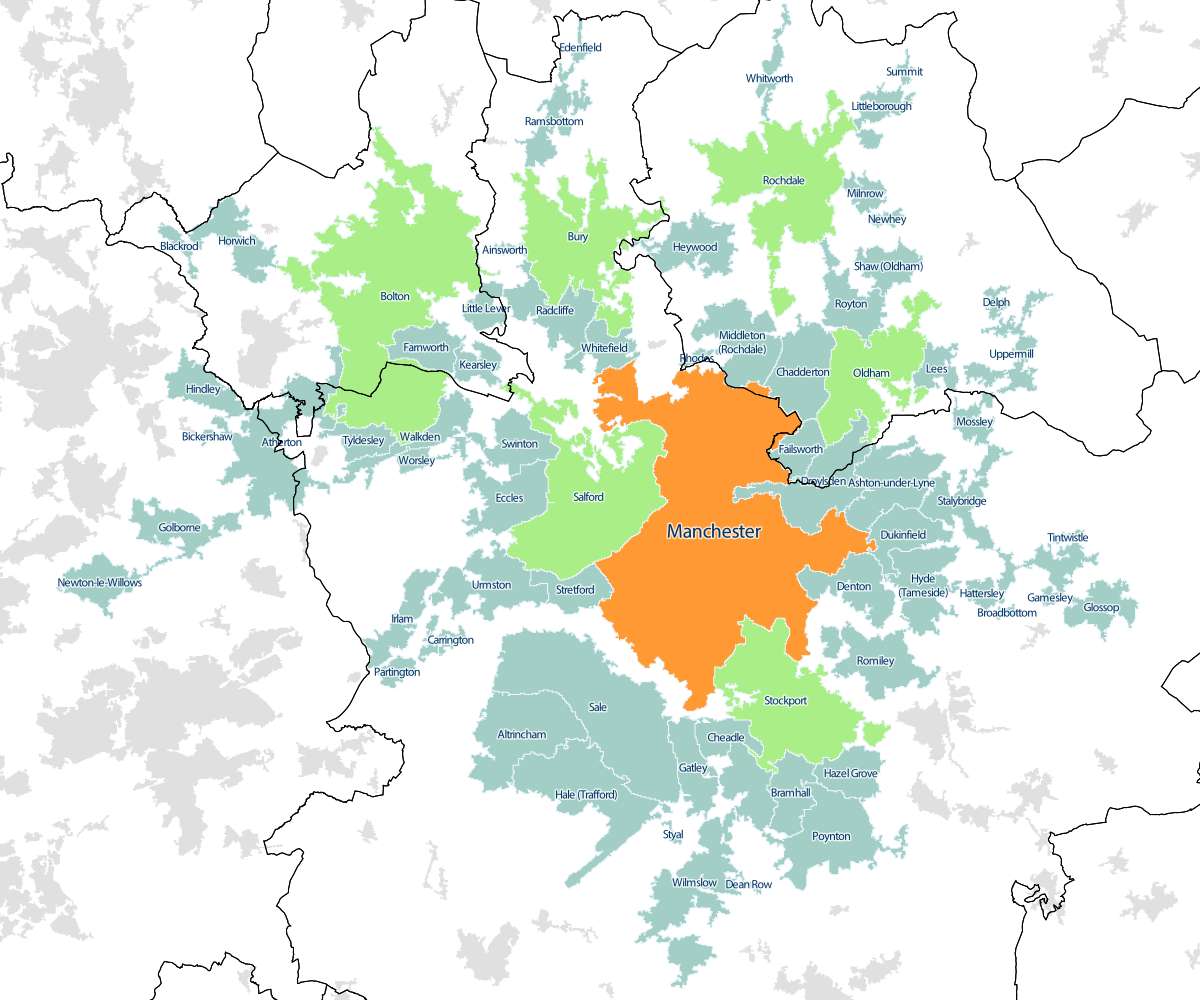
- A map of the Greater Manchester Built-up Area according to the 2011 census, with Travel to Work Areas overlaid. Manchester is highlighted in orange
- Coordinates: 53°30′N 2°18′W
- Sovereign state: United Kingdom
- Constituent country: England
- Largest settlements: (Pop. 100,000+): Manchester; Bolton; Sale; Rochdale; Stockport; Salford

Population (2021 census)
  - Conurbation: 3,009,684
  - Rank: 2nd
  - Urban: 2,720,316
- Time zone: UTC+0 (GMT)
  - Summer (DST): UTC+1 (BST)
- Postcode: BL, M, OL, SK, WA, WN
- Area codes: 01204, 01457, 0161, 01625, 01706, 01925, 01942

The Greater Manchester Built-up Area is an area of land defined by the Office for National Statistics (ONS), consisting of the large conurbation that encompasses the urban element of the city of Manchester and the metropolitan area that forms much of Greater Manchester in North West England. According to the United Kingdom Census 2011, the Greater Manchester Built-up Area has a population of 2,553,379 making it the second most populous conurbation in the United Kingdom after the Greater London Built-up Area. This was an increase of 14% from the population recorded at the United Kingdom Census 2001 of 2,240,230, when it was known as the Greater Manchester Urban Area.

The Greater Manchester Built-up Area is not conterminous with Greater Manchester, a metropolitan county of the same name (and, until 1974, part of the counties of Lancashire, Cheshire and Yorkshire) for it excludes settlements such as Wigan and Marple from Greater Manchester, but includes hinterland settlements which lie outside its statutory boundaries, such as Wilmslow in Cheshire, Glossop in Derbyshire, Whitworth in Lancashire and Newton-le-Willows in Merseyside.

== Constituent parts ==
The Greater Manchester Urban Area in 2001

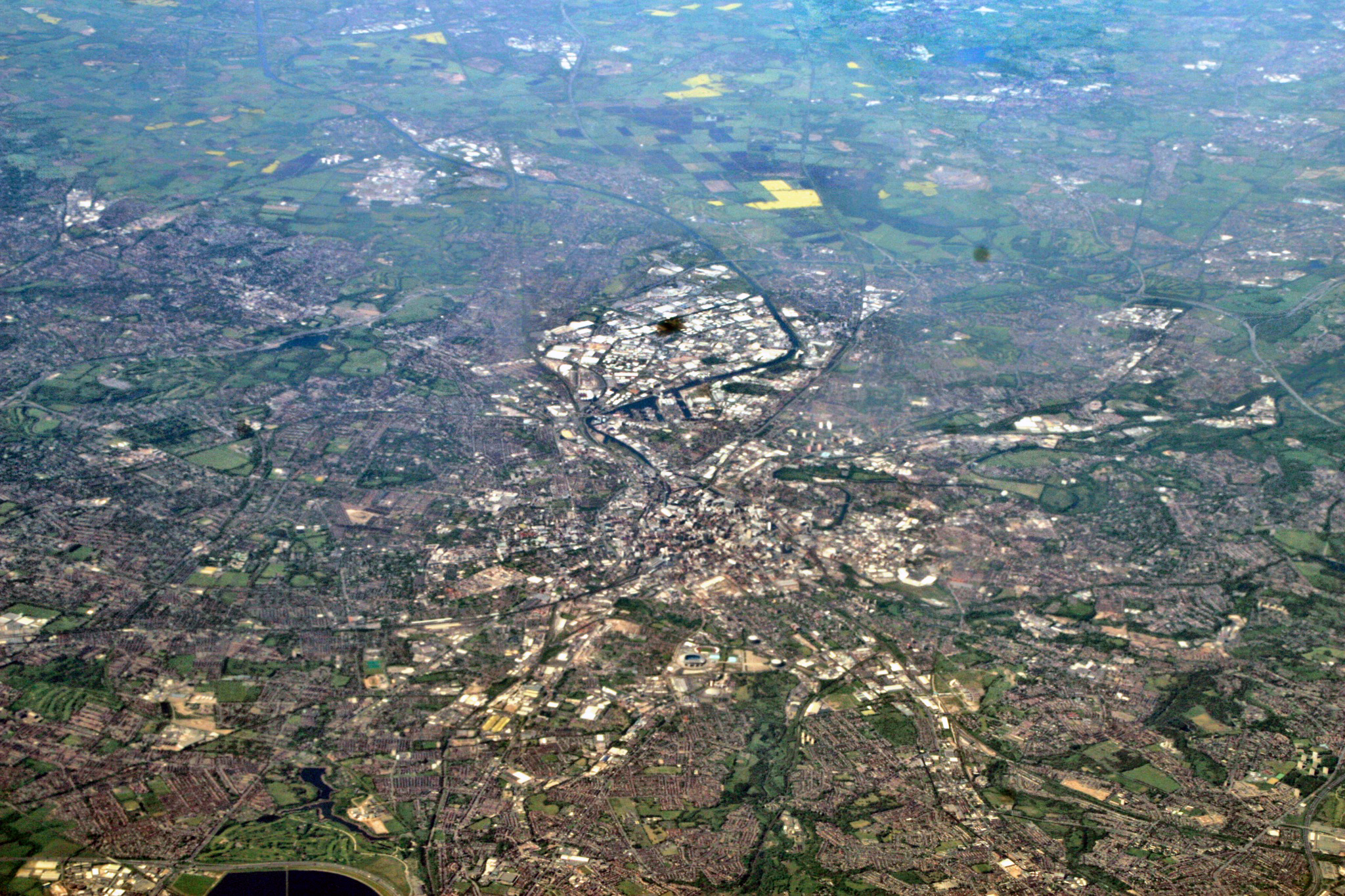
An aerial photograph looking west, centred on Manchester and Salford

The largest settlements (in descending order of population) within the Greater Manchester Built-up Area are Manchester, Bolton, Stockport, Oldham, Rochdale, Salford, and Bury. These settlements are not coterminous with the metropolitan boroughs of the same name, and the ONS takes some of its settlement boundaries within the conurbation from the contiguous urban core of pre-Local Government Act 1972 local government districts. This means that the GMUA bears a much closer resemblance to the earlier "SELNEC" area than to the Greater Manchester Metropolitan County. Unlike urban areas that expanded outwards around a central core of employment, the Greater Manchester Urban Area was formed from the inward expansion of several large manufacturing towns towards a centralised marketplace for the trading of goods and raw materials.

Wigan is separate from the Greater Manchester Built-up Area, although eastern parts of the wider Metropolitan Borough of Wigan, such as Leigh, Tyldesley and Atherton are included. Wigan and Ince-in-Makerfield are included in a separate Wigan Urban Area, which includes places outside Greater Manchester. The gap is formed between Ince-in-Makerfield (of Wigan Urban Area) and Hindley (Greater Manchester Urban Area).

Other built-up areas, including New Mills and the rest of High Peak, are narrowly avoided as is Ashton-in-Makerfield (which is included in the Liverpool Urban Area) and much of the parish of Saddleworth.

== Settlements ==
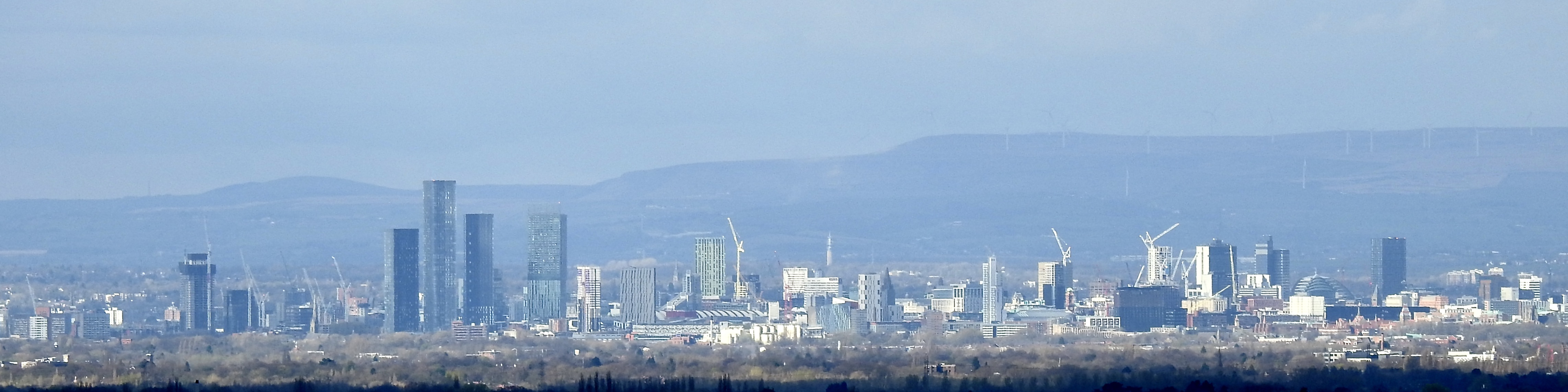
Skyline of Manchester.

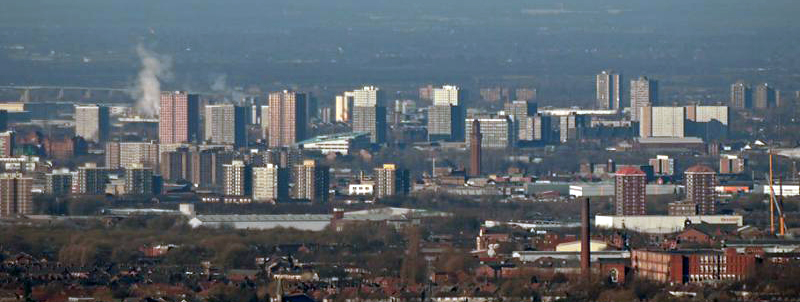
Skyline of Salford.

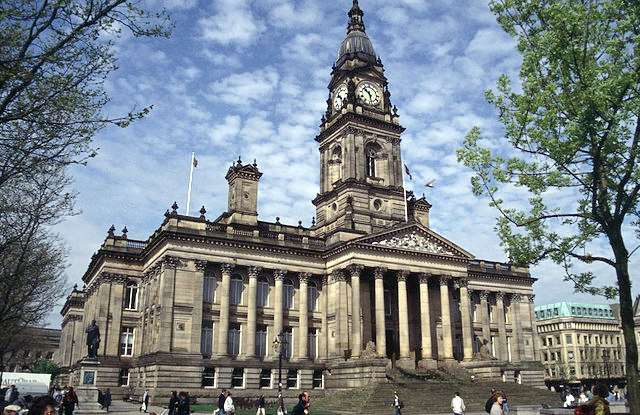
Bolton Town Hall

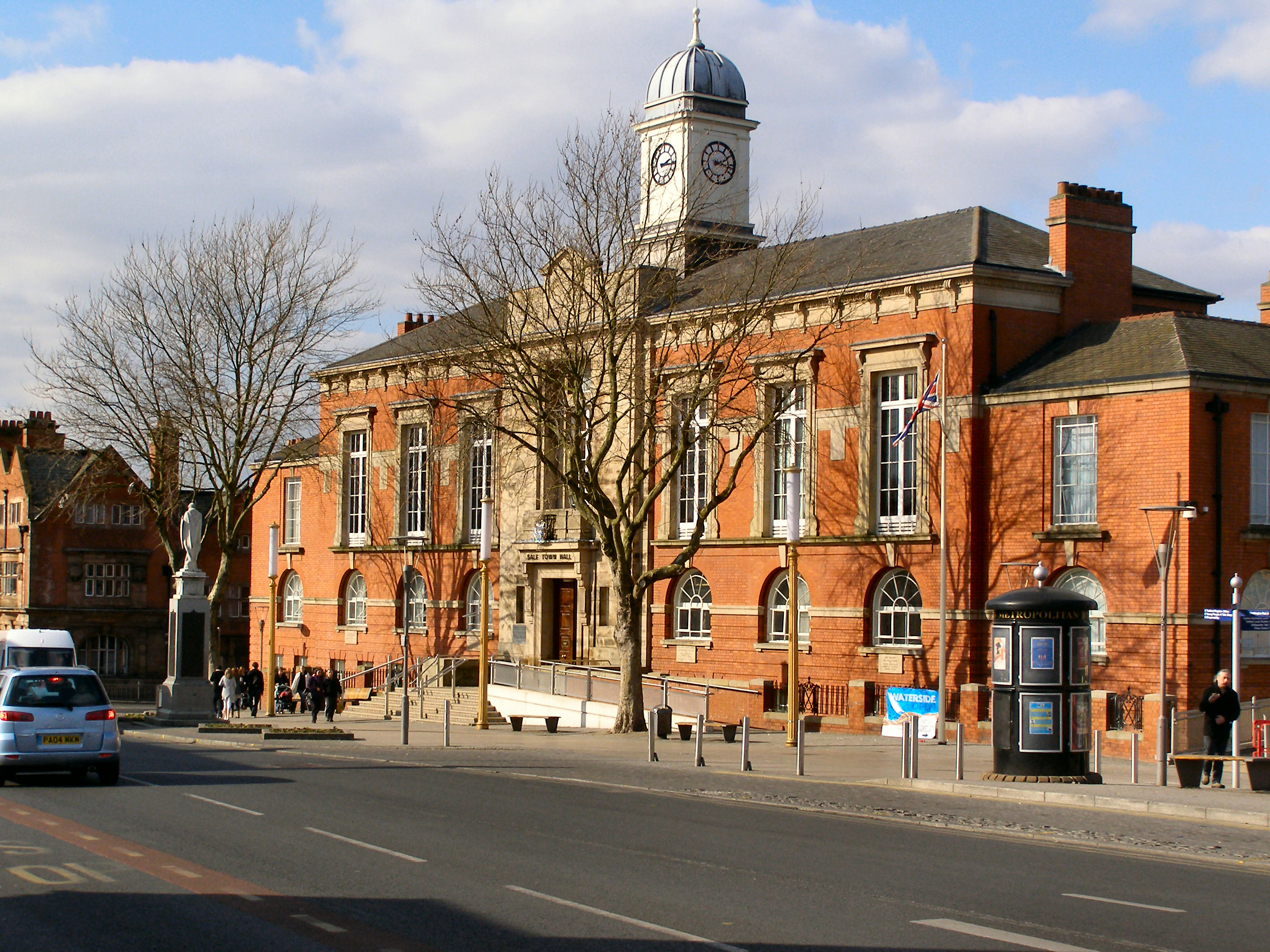
Sale Town Hall

According to the ONS definitions the Greater Manchester Built-up Area consists of the following settlements:

Rank	Urban subdivision	2011	2001	1991	1981	Extent
1	Manchester	510,746	394,269	402,889	448,604	
2	Bolton	194,189	139,403	139,020	143,921	
3	Sale	134,022	55,234	56,052	57,933	
4	Rochdale	107,926	95,796	94,313	97,942	
5	Stockport	105,878	136,082	132,813	136,792	
6	Salford	103,886	72,750	79,755	98,343	
7	Oldham	96,555	103,544	103,931	107,830	
8	Bury	77,211	60,718	62,633	62,181	
9	Atherton	70,542	20,302	21,696	22,032	
10	Altrincham	52,419	40,695	40,042	39,693	
11	Ashton-under-Lyne	45,198	43,236	43,906	44,196	
12	Middleton	42,972	45,314	45,621	51,437	
13	Urmston	41,825	40,964	41,804	44,030	
14	Eccles	38,756	36,610	36,000	37,792	
15	Denton	36,591	26,866	37,785	37,724	
16	Wilmslow	35,945		28,604	28,933	
17	Chadderton	34,818	33,001	34,026	33,518	
18	Romiley	34,696				
19	Hyde	34,003	31,253	30,666	30,551	
20	Glossop	33,020				
21	Radcliffe	29,950	34,239	32,567	27,642	
22	Heywood	28,205	28,024	29,286	29,686	
23	Farnworth	26,939	25,264	25,053	26,148	
24	Stretford	46,813	42,103	43,953	47,771	
25	Stalybridge	26,482	22,568	22,921	23,668	
26	Swinton	25,362	24,183	21,425	18,235	
#	Westhoughton	24,974	22,345	15,315	12,525	
27	Hindley	24,497	23,457	22,581	21,493	
28	Cheadle Hulme	24,362	23,253			
29	Golborne	24,167				
30	Droylsden	24,134	23,172	22,666	22,624	
31	Royton	23,812	22,238	21,475	21,098	
32	Newton-le-Willows	22,114				
33	Walkden	21,194	36,218	38,685	39,466	
34	Gatley	20,997				
35	Whitefield	20,975	23,284	22,783	27,650	
36	Dukinfield	20,909	18,885	17,917	17,501	
37	Irlam	19,933	19,018	18,504		
38	Horwich	19,492	18,289	18,017	16,769	
39	Hazel Grove	19,365				
40	Failsworth	18,844	20,007	20,160	20,951	
41	Shaw	18,815				
42	Ramsbottom	17,872	17,352	17,318	16,334	
43	Bramhall	17,436				
44	Hale	16,624	15,316	15,868	16,308	
45	Tyldesley	16,142	34,022	30,606	27,903	
46	Poynton	15,282	14,038	14,768	15,078	
47	Cheadle	13,467				
48	Uppermill	13,448				
49	Lees	13,062				
50	Little Lever	12,803	11,082	11,589	12,062	
51	Littleborough	12,370	13,807	13,638	13,787	
52	Kearsley	11,150	9,906	9,287	9,666	
53	Mossley	10,772		10,569	8,865	
54	Milnrow	10,015	12,776	12,541	11,631	
55	Worsley	9,108				
56	Partington	7,912	7,723	9,109		
57	Whitworth	7,500	5,672	5,679	5,682	
58	Hadfield	6,305				
59	Hattersley	4,825				
60	Blackrod	4,548				
61	Gamesley	3,263				
	Cheadle and Gatley		57,507	58,457	59,828	
	Leigh		43,006	43,150	42,929	
	Swinton and Pendlebury		41,347	43,155	44,508	
	Hazel Grove and Bramhall		38,724	39,730	40,680	
	Wilmslow/Alderley Edge		34,087			
	Prestwich		31,693	31,801	32,035	
	Bredbury and Romiley		28,167	28,205	28,558	
	Bromley Cross/Bradshaw		22,747	22,017	21,728	
	Shaw and Crompton		19,335	19,348	19,258	
	Audenshaw		12,790	13,173	10,771	
	Longdendale		8,680	10,890	12,901	
	Handforth		8,014			
	Tottington		7,545	7,673	6,745	
	Wardle		7,092	6,622	2,149	
	Brinnington		6,759			
	Bowdon		6,079	5,141	4,894	
	Alderley Edge			5,280	5,009	
	Buckton Vale			3,592	3,457	

Notes:

- Wilmslow and Alderley Edge have combined data in 2001 census, but are separate within 1981 and 1991 data
- Brinnington is not recognised as a settlement in 1981 and 1991 censuses
- Prestwich forms part of the Manchester subdivision in the 2011 census.
- Pendlebury forms part of the Salford subdivision in the 2011 census.
- Leigh forms part of the Atherton subdivision in the 2011 census.
- In the 2011 census the Sale subdivision includes large areas that were formerly part of the Manchester subdivision.
- Buckton Vale and Mossley were recognised as settlements within the Greater Manchester Urban Area in 1991 census, but were considered to be outside the Greater Manchester Urban Area in 2001. In the 2001 Census, they are considered to be part of a separate Mossley/Buckton Vale urban area, which had a population of 13,344, made up of sub-divisions of Mossley (9,713) and Buckton Vale (3,631). However they were considered to be inside the Greater Manchester Urban Area in 2011.
- Irlam is not considered to be part of the Greater Manchester Urban Area in 1981
- Golborne, Uppermill, Blackrod, Newton-le-Willows and Glossop were all considered separate urban areas until the 2011 census.

== See also ==
- Geography of Greater Manchester
- List of Greater Manchester settlements by population
