= St Peter's Church, Hindley =

Coordinates: 53.5334°N 2.5812°W

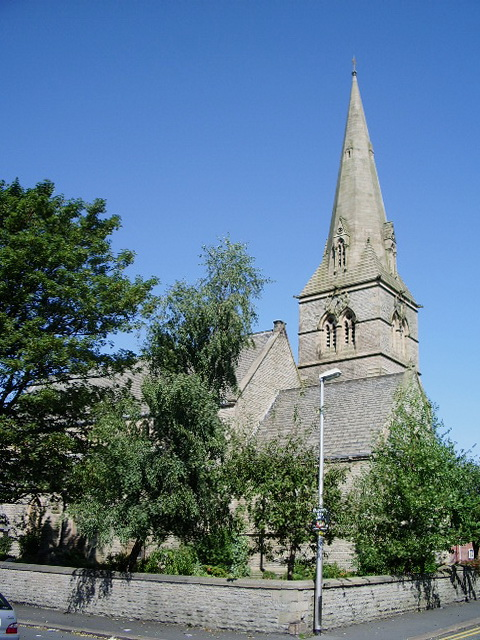
- St Peter's Church, Hindley

- Location in Greater Manchester
- OS grid reference: SD 616,042
- Location: Hindley, Wigan, Greater Manchester
- Country: England
- Denomination: Anglican
- Website: St Peter, Hindley

History
- Status: Parish church
- Dedication: Saint Peter

Architecture
- Functional status: Active
- Heritage designation: Grade II
- Designated: 10 May 1988
- Architect: E. G. Paley
- Architectural type: Church
- Style: Gothic Revival
- Groundbreaking: 1863
- Completed: 1866

Specifications
- Materials: Rock-faced stone with ashlar dressings Slate roof

Administration
- Province: York
- Diocese: Liverpool
- Archdeaconry: Warrington
- Deanery: Wigan
- Parish: St Peter, Hindley

Clergy
- Rector: Revd. Rev Dot Gosling, Hub Leader, Wigan East Chaplefields’ Parish Worship portfolio lead (team rector of Chapelfields Parish)

St Peter's Church is located on the junction of Atherton Road and Liverpool Road, Hindley, Wigan, Greater Manchester, England. It is an active Anglican parish church in the deanery of Wigan, the archdeaconry of Warrington, and the diocese of Liverpool. St Peter's is recorded in the National Heritage List for England as a designated Grade II listed building.

== History ==
The church was built in 1863–66 and designed by the Lancaster architect E. G. Paley. It cost £9,507 (equivalent to £980,000 in 2025), and provided seating for 689 people.

Restructuring in 2019

The church parish underwent a major structural and organisational change in 2019. The Parish of St. Peter's was abolished and merged with the nearby parishes of All Saints Hindley, Good Shepherd Bamfurlong, St. John's Hindley Green, St John the Evangelist Abram, St. Nathaniel's Platt Bridge and St John and St Elizabeth Bickershaw to form the new 7 church parish of Chapelfields. The restructuring was strongly opposed by many worshippers in the church community, with petitions and protests being organised in opposition.

Revd. David M Brooke was installed as team rector to implement the new parish structure. The financial independence of the church, the appointment of a church priest, along with the right to appoint a Parochial Church Council (PCC) were revoked by the Bishop of Liverpool. Many worshippers chose to boycott the church as a result of the new parish reorganisation and the perceived loss of community cohesion. The Chapelfields parish, and the wider Church in Wigan structure, is currently under review with plans being drawn up to return to a more traditional one church - one parish system. St Peter's church Hindley is a thriving church with a growing congregation doing good works in the community.

== Architecture ==
=== Exterior ===
St Peter's is constructed in rock-faced stone with ashlar dressings and has a slate roof. Its plan consists of a five-bay nave with a clerestory, north and south aisles, a chancel with a southwest vestry, north and south porches, and a northeast tower with a broach spire. The tower has diagonal buttresses, a stair turret to the east, and a three-light north window. The bell openings are paired, each having two lights and louvres. At the top of the tower is a cornice and gargoyles. The spire has two tiers of lucarnes, the lower tier having two lights. Along the walls of the aisles are two-light windows containing Geometric tracery. Between the windows are buttresses with gables, the cornices of which are carved with animals. Along the clerestory are pairs of two-light windows. At the west end of the nave is a four-light window flanked by gabled buttresses. There are two-light windows at the west ends of the aisles. The east window has three lights, and is also flanked by gabled buttresses. In the south wall of the chancel is a two-light window with a trefoil head.

=== Interior ===
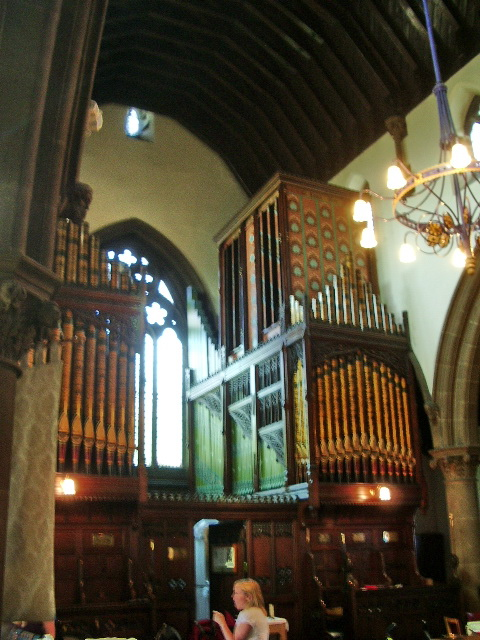
Organ

The arcades are carried on round piers with crocketted capitals. The wagon roof is supported by separate corbelled shafts. In the church are two wrought iron chandeliers. The font is round and is carried on a quatrefoil column. Its bowl is carved with roundels. The stained glass includes a window dated 1881 to the memory of a nine-year-old child; it incorporates his photograph twice. The organ is at the west end. It has three manuals and was made by Edmund Schulze in 1873. It was rebuilt in 1903 with pneumatic action by Thomas Pendlebury of Leigh. In 1966 J. H. Cowen of Liverpool added a detached electric console and more stops. In 1977 most of the alterations made by Cowan were reversed by the Pendlebury Organ Company of Cleveleys, who also added a new detached drawstop console. The organ has been awarded a Historic Organ Certificate, Grade II*. This organ is no longer in a playable condition, and the church currently uses a digital computing organ built by Hugh Banton in 2004. There is a ring of eight bells, all cast in 1866 by Mears and Stainbank of the Whitechapel Bell Foundry.

== See also ==
- List of churches in Greater Manchester
- Listed buildings in Hindley, Greater Manchester
- List of ecclesiastical works by E. G. Paley
