= Hindley Town Hall =

Judicial building in Hindley, Greater Manchester, England

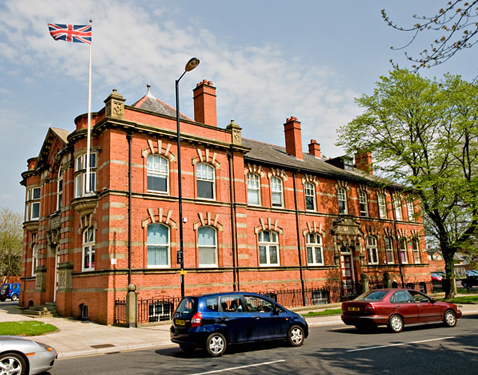
- Hindley Town Hall

- Shown in Greater Manchester
- 53.5350°N 2.5821°W
- Location: Cross Street, Hindley

History
- Built: 1903

Site notes
- Architect(s): Heaton, Ralph and Heaton
- Architectural style: Queen Anne Revival style

Hindley Town Hall, also known as Hindley Council Offices, is a municipal building in Cross Street, Hindley, Greater Manchester, England. The building is currently used by Wigan Metropolitan Borough Council for the delivery of local health and social care services.

== History ==
After significant industrial growth in the mid-19th century, largely associated with the coal mining industry, a local board of health was formed under the leadership of a local merchant, Richard Pennington, in 1867. By the early 1880s, the council had established its offices in Cross Street. Hindley became an urban district in 1894 and, in this context, civic leaders decided to demolish the existing offices and build a new structure on the same site.

The building was designed by Heaton, Ralph and Heaton in the Queen Anne Revival style, built in red brick with ashlar stone dressings and was completed in 1903. The design involved a symmetrical main frontage of three bays on the corner of Wigan Road and Cross Street. The central bay featured a doorway flanked by brick pilasters supporting a stone hood mould. The hood mould was broken by three brackets supporting a stone panel which was inscribed with the words "Council Offices". There was a round headed window with a curved fanlight on the first floor. The central bay was flanked by pairs of banded Ionic order pilasters supporting a modillioned pediment. The outer bays were fenestrated on the ground floor by segmental headed windows with hood moulds. The hood moulds were broken by brackets supporting the oriel windows which fenestrated the first floor. At roof level, there was a parapet. Internally, the principal room was the council chamber which hosted monthly meetings of the urban district council. Although the stone panel described the building as "Council Offices", it was also known as the "Town Hall" from an early stage.

The building continued to serve as the offices of Hindley Urban District Council for much of the 20th century, but ceased to be the local seat of government when Wigan Metropolitan Borough Council was formed in 1974. It was subsequently used by Wigan Metropolitan Borough Council for the delivery of local services. In September 2016, the council announced that 1,000 staff from the council, from Wrightington, Wigan and Leigh NHS Foundation Trust and from Bridgewater Community Healthcare NHS Foundation Trust would co-locate in the building to achieve better co-ordination of the delivery of health and social care services in the area.
