= Borsdane Wood =

Woodland in Greater Manchester, England

Coordinates: 53°33′N 2°34′W

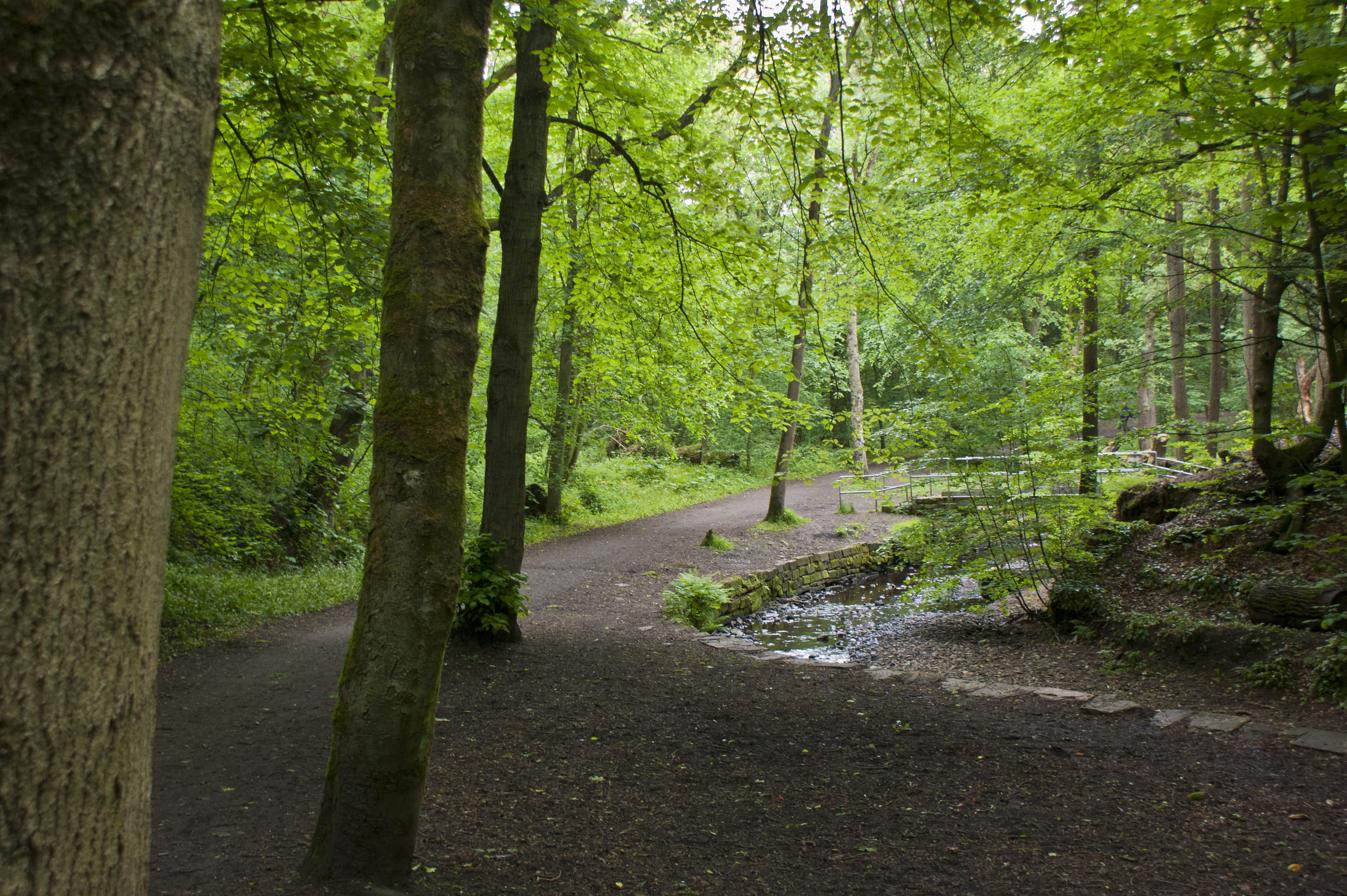
The path through Borsdane Wood

Borsdane Wood is an Ancient Semi Natural Woodland in the Mersey Rivers catchment area, in the Metropolitan Borough of Wigan and Metropolitan Borough of Bolton, Greater Manchester, England. It is believed to have been continuous woodland cover since before 1600 AD and is composed of native tree species that have not obviously been planted. Borsdane Wood was designated a Local Nature Reserve in 1986.

The wood consists of approximately 34 hectares (85 acres) of mixed broadleaf trees including species such as oak, ash, birch, cherry, hazel, hawthorn, blackthorn and dog rose, as well as areas of open ground. With trees many hundreds of years old the wood has remained relatively unchanged for centuries and is home to a wide variety of wildlife. The wood follows the course of the Borsdane Brook which is the boundary between Hindley and Westhoughton and the Metropolitan Boroughs of Wigan and Bolton.

From Hindley, Greater Manchester there are several entrances to the wood, one of which can be accessed from Hindley centre through Raynor Park or through the cemetery. A tunnel under the railway leads into woodland little changed in centuries. A path leads to Aspull, Greater Manchester where the access is located near the Gerrard Arms Public House.

The town of Westhoughton is adjacent to the wood.
