= Hindley Green =

Village in Greater Manchester, England

Coordinates: 53.5248°N 2.5464°W

- Location within Greater Manchester
- Population: 11,186
- OS grid reference: SD637032
- Metropolitan borough: Wigan
- Metropolitan county: Greater Manchester
- Region: North West
- Country: England
- Sovereign state: United Kingdom
- Post town: WIGAN
- Postcode district: WN2
- Dialling code: 01942
- Police: Greater Manchester
- Fire: Greater Manchester
- Ambulance: North West
- UK Parliament: Makerfield

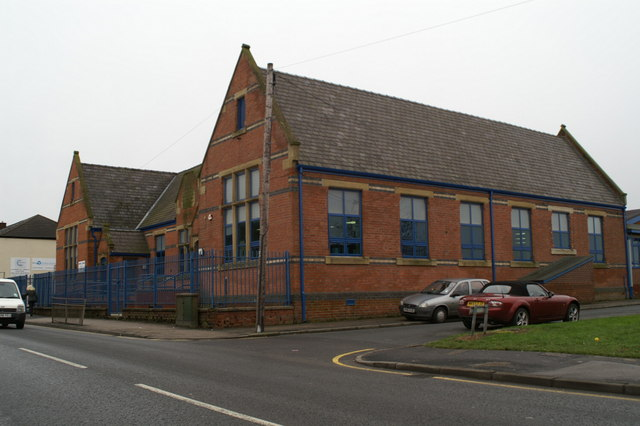
St John's School, Hindley Green, repaired and refurbished

Hindley Green (/ˈhɪndli ˌɡriːn/ HIND-lee GREEN) is a village in Hindley in the Metropolitan Borough of Wigan, Greater Manchester, England. The population of the village had decreased to 11,186 at the 2011 Census. The village lies to the east of Hindley and is centred on the A577 Atherton Road to its boundary with Westleigh, Leigh.

== History ==
Since 1852 Hindley Green has had 14 coal pits. Hindley Green railway station was opened in 1864 and closed in 1961. It was situated on Leigh Road.

Hindley Green was also the site of a Turner Brothers Asbestos factory which opened in 1949. Asbestos caused many chronic industrial diseases leading to payouts for those affected.

== Governance ==
Hindley Green forms one of the twenty-five wards of the metropolitan borough. Each ward returns three councillors to the seventy-five member Wigan Council. Councillors have a four-year term of office, with elections held in three years out of four. Of the three ward councillors there is Two Labour Councillors James Palmer and John Vickers , One Reform Councillor (Who no ones ever seen or heard from since may the 7th. The council is controlled by the Labour Party which enjoys a large majority.

The area forms part of the Wigan Division of the Greater Manchester Police. Hindley Green is one of five communities (the others being Abram, Ashton-in-Makerfield, Bryn and Hindley) served by the Hindley Neighbourhood Policing Team, based at Bamfurlong Police Station.

== Education ==
There are three primary schools in the area: Hindley Green Community Primary School, St John's Church of England Primary School and Sacred Heart Roman Catholic Primary School.

== Local facilities ==
Hindley Green is served well by a number of church-run clubs including scouts, guides, rangers, boys’ brigade, slimming world and various fitness groups.

There is also a thriving football club, as well as a couple of local shops, a post office, a restaurant, a couple of takeaways and a couple of public houses.

It's also the site of an award-winning creative design studio (NW Design) which is supported by entrepreneur and ex-Dragons' Den star Theo Paphitis.

== Religious sites ==
Hindley Green has four churches:

- St.John the Evangelist Church of England. The church was established in 1903, the area having previously formed part of the parish of Hindley.
- Sacred Heart Roman Catholic Church, Hindley Green, founded in 1932. Father Gordon was the priest from the 70s to the millennium.
- Hindley Green Methodist Church, originally known as the Brunswick Chapel, was opened in 1855.
- Hindley Green Family Church which meets at the Bethel community centre.

== Economy ==
In March 2011, Wigan borough council granted permission to build the UK's first zero-energy business park. The £2.7 million scheme created around 21,000 sq ft (2,000 m^{2}) of office space at Swan Lane, Hindley Green Industrial Estate. The tenants are not required to pay gas, electric or water costs because of the zero carbon technologies used such as wind turbines and rainwater collection.

== See also ==
- List of mining disasters in Lancashire
