= Listed buildings in Hindley, Greater Manchester =

Hindley is a town in the Metropolitan Borough of Wigan, Greater Manchester, England. It contains 12 listed buildings that are recorded in the National Heritage List for England. All the listed buildings are designated at Grade II, the lowest of the three grades, which is applied to "buildings of national importance and special interest". The traditional industry in the town was nail making, and in the 19th century mining and textiles arrived in the area. There are no listed buildings associated with any of these industries. The listed buildings consist of houses, farmhouses and farm buildings, churches, a public house, a footbridge, and a library and museum.

== Buildings ==
Name and location	Photograph	Date	Notes
Higher Barn Farmhouse; 53.54365°N 2.56573°W		17th century	The farmhouse was later extended and altered. It is in brick with stone dressings and slate roofs. There are two storeys with attics, two gabled bays, and lean-to extensions on the sides. There is a plain doorway in the second bay and a segmental-headed doorway in the left extension. On the ground floor of the second bay is a three-light horizontally-sliding sash window, and on the upper floor is a mullioned window and an attic window, both with hood moulds; the other windows are casements.
Barn, Higher Barn Farmhouse; 53.54383°N 2.56545°W		17th century	This consists of a barn, a cow house, and a later stable, in brick with some stone dressings and a stone-slate roof. The barn has four bays, entrances and ventilation slots, the cow house has an entrance and windows, all with wedge lintels. Above the stable is a granary approached by external steps.
Southworth House; 53.52751°N 2.56155°W	—	Early 18th century	A brick house on a stone plinth, with stone dressings, quoins, bands, and a slate roof. There are three storeys, two bays, and a lower two-storey two-bay extension to the right. The doorway has an architrave, and the windows are casements, those on the lower two floors of the main part with flat brick arches, keystones and end voussoirs.
Barn southwest of No. 444 Atherton Road; 53.52739°N 2.56184°W	—	18th century (probable)	The barn, which was altered in the 19th century, is in brick with a stone-slate roof. It has three bays and three entrances, two with elliptical heads, and the other with a round head.
Hindley House; 53.52865°N 2.56432°W	—	18th century	A stuccoed house with a top fluted frieze, a dentilled cornice, and a slate roof. There are two storeys and four bays, the fourth bay being wider. In the third bay is a doorway with Doric columns, moulded jambs, an elliptical head with an archivolt, and a fanlight. On the ground floor is a canted bay window, and there is a sash window in the fourth bay. The upper floor contains casement windows, with the window in the third bay having panelled pilasters, a frieze, and a cornice on consoles.
All Saints' Church; 53.53412°N 2.57068°W		1766	A vestry was added in 1933. The church is in brick with stone dressings and a pantile roof, and has a rectangular plan, with the vestry at the northeast. The windows are round-headed with keystones and three lights. Above the windows at the west end is a lunette and a louvred opening, on the corners of the gable are pinnacles, and on the apex is a bellcote with a domical top. In the south front is a doorway with an architrave, a frieze and a cornice, and inside there is a west gallery.
The Lord Nelson Hotel; 53.53684°N 2.57539°W		Late 18th century	A public house that was remodelled in the mid-19th century, it is in brick, stuccoed at the front, with sill bands and a Welsh slate roof. There are two storeys, three bays, and a rusticated ground floor. The windows are sashes with moulded surrounds, the ground floor windows having lintels with scrolled decoration. Along the top is a frieze of stucco panels. The doorway has a moulded surround, a dentilled cornice, and a fanlight, and above it is a stucco panel with the name of the pub.
Woodlands; 53.53066°N 2.57276°W	—	Late 18th century	A house that was extended in the 19th century, it is in brick on a stone plinth, with stone dressings, a cornice and a hipped slate roof. There are two storeys, three bays on each front, and an extension to the right rear with two bays on each front. The entrance has an elliptical porch with a hipped roof, and a canopy on timber brackets. The windows are sashes with segmental brick heads.
St Peter's Church; 53.53343°N 2.58116°W		1863–1866	The church, designed by E. G. Paley, is in stone with a slate roof. It consists of a nave with a clerestory, north and south aisles, a chancel, a southwest vestry, and a northeast steeple. The steeple has a tower with diagonal buttresses, an east stair turret, a three-light north window, clock faces in the bell stage, a top cornice with gargoyles, and a broach spire with two tiers of lucarnes.
Hindley Library and Museum; 53.53530°N 2.57868°W		1886	The library and museum, designed by Thomas Worthington, are in brick with stone dressings, bands, a top cornice, a parapet, and a slate roof. There are two storeys with a basement and six bays. The first bay projects forward and contains an entrance porch and has a pyramidal roof. The porch projects further and has two round-headed arches with round piers, octagonal turrets on the corners surmounted by heraldic beasts, an inscribed frieze, and a balustrade. The bays to the right have half-octagonal shafts with finials, and the middle three bays contain two-storey bay windows with mullions.
Deep Pit railway footbridge 53.54159°N 2.58109°W	—	1887	The pedestrian overbridge was built by the Lancashire and Yorkshire Railway. It is in wrought iron with a cast iron frame, and consists of a single span with a basket arch in the form of a bowstring truss, and with piers and abutments in blue engineering brick. The portals are decorated and arched, and have finials. At the southern end is a wrought iron ramp with riveted lattice balustrades. The bridge is approached from the northeast by a setted path about 25 metres (82 ft) long.
St John's Methodist Church; 53.53713°N 2.57612°W		1900–01	The church is in pale stone with dressings in red sandstone and Westmorland slate roofs. It consists of a nave, transepts, a chancel with an apse and flanking vestries. At the west end is a steeple over a two-storey porch, with windows and a gable to the right and an octagonal turret on the corner. The steeple has four unequal stages and a spire with gabled lucarnes. The windows are round-headed, some being lancets.
