= Lord Nelson Hotel, Hindley =

Listed pub in Greater Manchester, England

Lord Nelson Hotel
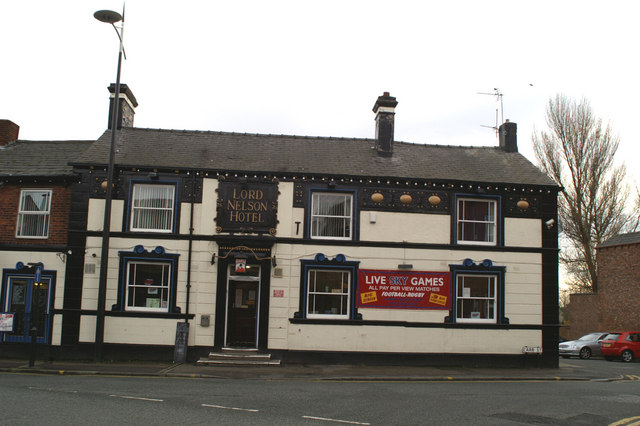
- The pub in 2008

- Location within Greater Manchester

General information
- Type: Public house
- Location: 4 Bridge Street, Hindley, Greater Manchester, England
- Coordinates: 53.5368°N 2.5754°W
- Year built: Late 18th century
- Renovated: Mid-19th century (remodelled)

Design and construction
- Designations

Listed Building – Grade II
- Official name: The Lord Nelson Hotel
- Designated: 24 September 1990
- Reference no.: 1393531

The Lord Nelson Hotel is a Grade II listed public house on Bridge Street in Hindley, a town within the Metropolitan Borough of Wigan, Greater Manchester, England. Built in the late 18th century, it was altered in the mid-19th century. The 1894 and 1908 Ordnance Survey maps show the building without a name or designation, while the 1928 edition records it as a pub. The site was included in the Hindley Town Centre conservation area in 1989. As of May 2024, the pub's freehold was privately owned.

== History ==
The building was constructed in the late 18th century, according to its official listing, and was remodelled in the mid-19th century, when its windows were replaced and decorative stucco panels in the Victorian style were added. The 1894 and 1908 Ordnance Survey maps show the building without a name or designation, while the 1928 edition records it as a public house.

In 1989 the site was included within the newly designated Hindley Town Centre conservation area, and on 24 September 1990, the Lord Nelson Hotel was designated a Grade II listed building. As of May 2024, the pub's freehold was privately owned.

== Architecture ==
The building is constructed in brick with a stuccoed front and a Welsh slate roof. It was probably laid out as three units originally, but was reorganised in the mid‑19th century to form a series of small public and private rooms. It has two storeys with chimneys at each end and another set slightly off‑centre. The front has decorative features inspired by 16th‑century Renaissance styles.

It has a regular arrangement of three first‑floor windows, a rusticated ground floor, and sash windows with margin panes set on continuous sill bands. A frieze of strapwork panels runs across the first floor, and the corners have rusticated detailing. Brackets support the eaves cornice. The central entrance projects slightly and has a moulded surround with a dentilled cornice and a door with a rectangular overlight. Above it is a large stucco panel in a moulded frame displaying the name of the pub.

== See also ==
- Listed buildings in Hindley, Greater Manchester
- Listed pubs in Greater Manchester
