= Hindley, Greater Manchester =

Town in Greater Manchester, England

Coordinates: 53°32′08″N 2°33′57″W

Hindley
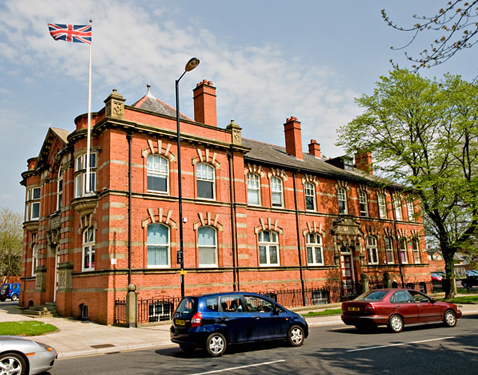
- Hindley Town Hall

- Location within Greater Manchester
- Population: 25,001
- OS grid reference: SD6204
- Metropolitan borough: Wigan
- Metropolitan county: Greater Manchester
- Region: North West
- Country: England
- Sovereign state: United Kingdom
- Post town: WIGAN
- Postcode district: WN2
- Dialling code: 01942
- Police: Greater Manchester
- Fire: Greater Manchester
- Ambulance: North West
- UK Parliament: Makerfield

Hindley (/ˈhɪndli/ HIND-lee) is a town within the Metropolitan Borough of Wigan in Greater Manchester, England. It is three miles (4.8 km) east of Wigan and covers an area of 2,580 acres (1,044 ha). Within the boundaries of the historic county of Lancashire, Hindley (which includes Hindley Green) borders the towns and villages of Ince-in-Makerfield, Aspull, Westhoughton, Atherton and Westleigh in the former borough of Leigh. In 2001, Hindley had a population of 23,457, increasing to 28,000 at the 2011 Census. It forms part of the wider Greater Manchester Urban Area.

== History ==
=== Toponymy ===
The name Hindley is derived from the Old English hind and leah, meaning a "clearing frequented by hinds or does".

The town is first recorded as Hindele in 1212 and then variously as "Hindeleye" [1259], "Hyndeley" [1285 and 1332],Hindelegh[1301], "Hyndelegh" [1303 and 1375]. The first recorded use of its current spelling, Hindley, was in 1479.

=== Early history ===
Hindley was one of 15 berewicks of the royal manor of Newton before the Norman conquest in 1066. After the conquest, it formed part of the Barony of Makerfield. The area was held by free tenants until 1330 when Robert Langton, Baron Makerfield, gave the lordship of the manor to his younger son. His descendants were lords of the manor until 1765 when it was sold to the Duke of Bridgewater.

From the Middle Ages until the 18th century the land was a mixture of pastoral, farming and woodland and the farmers were tenants of a variety of lords. Parish registers from the end of the 17th century reveal that residents were Yeomen, independent farmers who supplemented their income by spinning and weaving. There are also references to Blacksmiths, whitesmiths, nailers and wheelwrights. Hindley was noted for its nail making between the 17th and 19th centuries.

=== Industrial Revolution ===
The first recorded coal mine was in 1528 and by the end of the 19th century, there were over 20 collieries in the area. Ladies Lane Colliery belonging to the Wigan Coal and Iron Company employed 282 underground and 40 surface workers in 1896. At the start of the 20th century, profitable coal seams were nearly exhausted and concerns were raised regarding the need to diversify industry and further develop the cotton mills. Peak production of coal was achieved just before the First World War. The period between the First and Second world wars was marked by the closure of most collieries and mills including Hindley Field and Swan Lane collieries in 1927, Hindley Green Colliery in 1928; Lowe Hall Colliery in 1931; Lowe Mill closing in 1934 and Worthington Mill was demolished. During the post-war period, the Hindley workings became part of the large colliery complexes developed at Bickershaw, Parsonage and Golborne.

Cotton manufacturing became important from the end of the 17th century until the middle of the 20th century. Hand-loom weaving was one of the chief industries, each cottage having a weaving shop attached and as the Industrial Revolution developed, larger mills were built. The first cotton factory was built in 1785 by Richard Battersby at Lowe Mill, a former water corn-mill. In 1822, John Pennington constructed his first power-driven mill. He was a significant employer of hand-loom weavers in the late 18th and early 19th century.

In 1790 Market Street, then known as Mill Lane, remained unmetalled and undeveloped but by 1835 John Leyland provided an insight into the growth of the town when he wrote, "Mr Pennington is extending his works, and a new mill is being built by Mr Walker. When these get completed a large increase in inhabitants must follow. In a small time it will doubtless rank as a small town."

The population of Hindley increased during the 19th century from 2,300 in 1811 to 23,000 in 1911 reflecting the transformation of the town from a country village to a small densely populated industrial town. The economic depression of the 1920s and 1930s hit Hindley hard, and by the time of the Second World War the population had declined to 19,000.

The coal mining and cotton spinning have all disappeared and most residents of Hindley now work in Wigan, Bolton, St Helens and Warrington or commute to Manchester or Liverpool.

== Governance ==
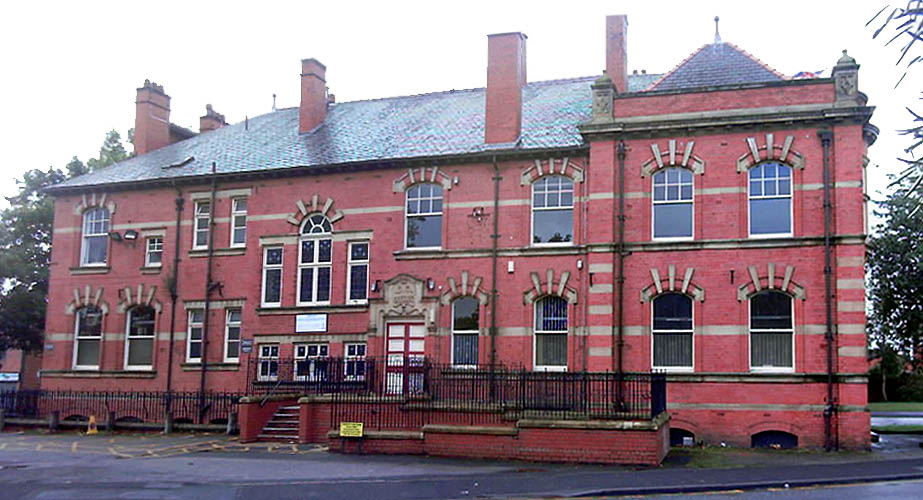
Hindley Town Hall viewed from Cross Street in 2006.

Hindley was a chapelry, in the parish of Wigan in the Hundred of West Derby, a judicial division of southwest Lancashire. In 1837 Hindley became part of the Wigan Poor Law Union, which took responsibility for the administration and funding of the Poor Law and made use of buildings on Frog Lane Wigan and at Hindley. The Local Government Act 1858 was adopted by the township in 1867, and under the Local Government Act 1894 an Urban District council of fifteen members was constituted. Hindley Town Hall, designed by Heaton, Ralph and Heaton, was opened in 1903; Hindley Urban District Council continued to administer the area until it became part of the Metropolitan Borough of Wigan in 1974.

== Geography ==
Hindley covers an area of 2,527 acres (3.9 sq mi; 10.2 km^{2}), mostly pasture and the underlying rocks are the coal measures. Some ancient woodland remains today in Borsdane Wood which is protected as a Local Nature Reserve. Hindley town centre is approximately three miles east of Wigan and adjoins Leigh on its south-east side. The pattern of roads is little changed from medieval times, the road from Prescot to Bolton, A58, and road linking Ormskirk with Boothstown, the A577 cross near the town centre.

== Demography ==
The population of Hindley increased during the 19th century from 2,300 in 1811 to 24,100 in 1911 reflecting the transformation of the town from a country village to a small, dense industrial town. The economic depression of the 1920s and 1930s hit Hindley hard and by the time of the Second World War the population had declined to 19,000. The Census of 2001 showed that the population had returned to that of a century earlier.

Population growth in Hindley since 1901
Year	1901	1911	1921	1931	1939	1951	1961	1981	1991	2001
Population	23,504	24,100	23,563	21,632	18,993	19,415	19,396	21,493	22,581	23,457
Urban District 1901–1971 • Urban Subdivision 1981–2001

== Transport ==
Public transport in Hindley is co-ordinated by Transport for Greater Manchester. There are public transport links by rail from Hindley railway station to all stops between Wigan Wallgate and Manchester via Bolton and Atherton, operated by Northern. There are two platforms in use, with the remains of two older and disused platforms still in existence.

== Education ==
Hindley and Abram Grammar School established in 1632 survived until the 1990s when, as Park High School, it was closed. The building survives as a teachers' centre on Park Road. The original school was situated in "Lowe Hall" and the first edition of the Ordnance Survey map (1848) shows it was at the end of a short track off Stony Lane, now Liverpool Road. It was known as "The Lowe School". The school relocated to Park Road in 1856 Originally pupils attended without payment but by 1829 the master was at liberty to make charges for instruction in Latin, writing and arithmetic. By 1882 the building consisted of a large schoolroom, a smaller classroom and a headmaster's house. Between 1900 and its closure Hindley and Abram grew in size. The school was supported by a charitable foundation which continues to operate.

Mornington High School was established in the early 1960s and became a comprehensive in 1976. The school was renamed Hindley High School in 2006, and became Outwood Academy Hindley in 2022.

== Religion ==
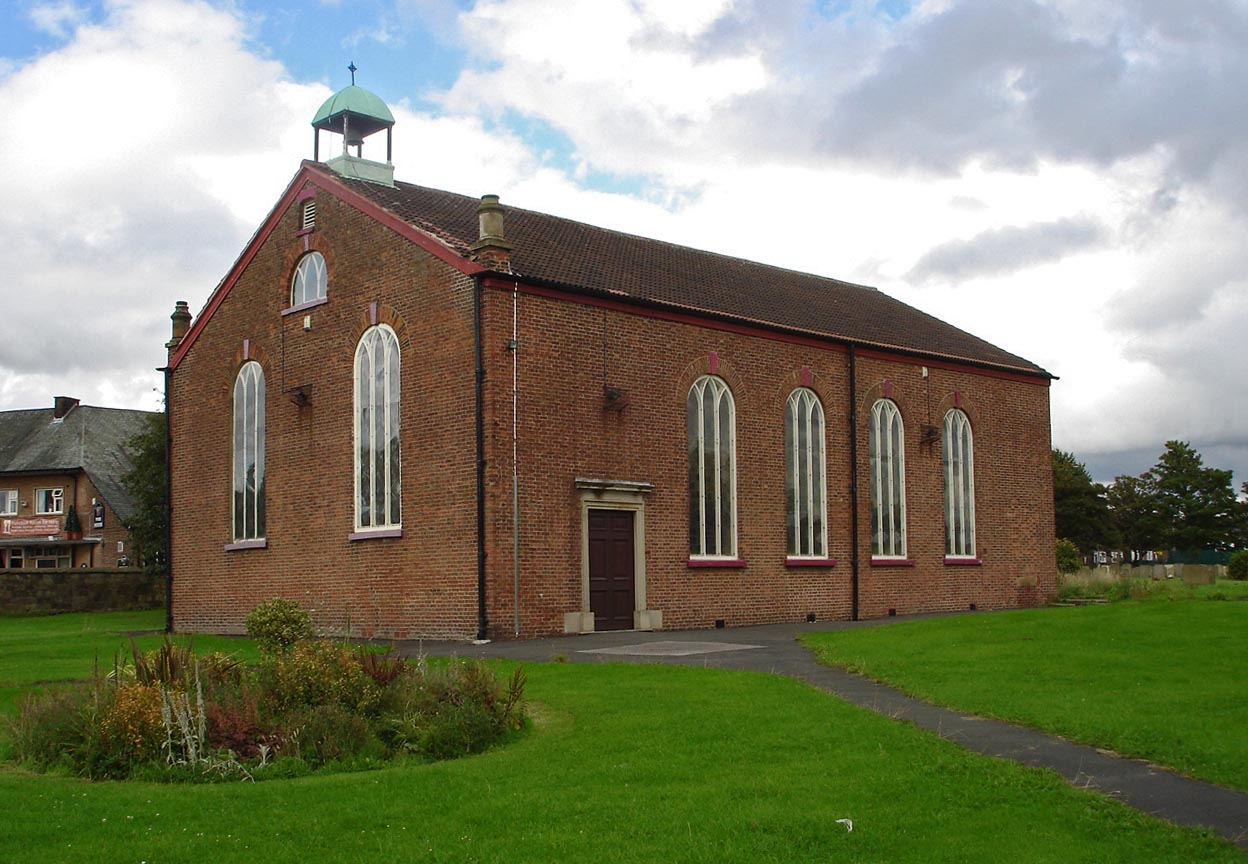
All Saints' Parish Church.

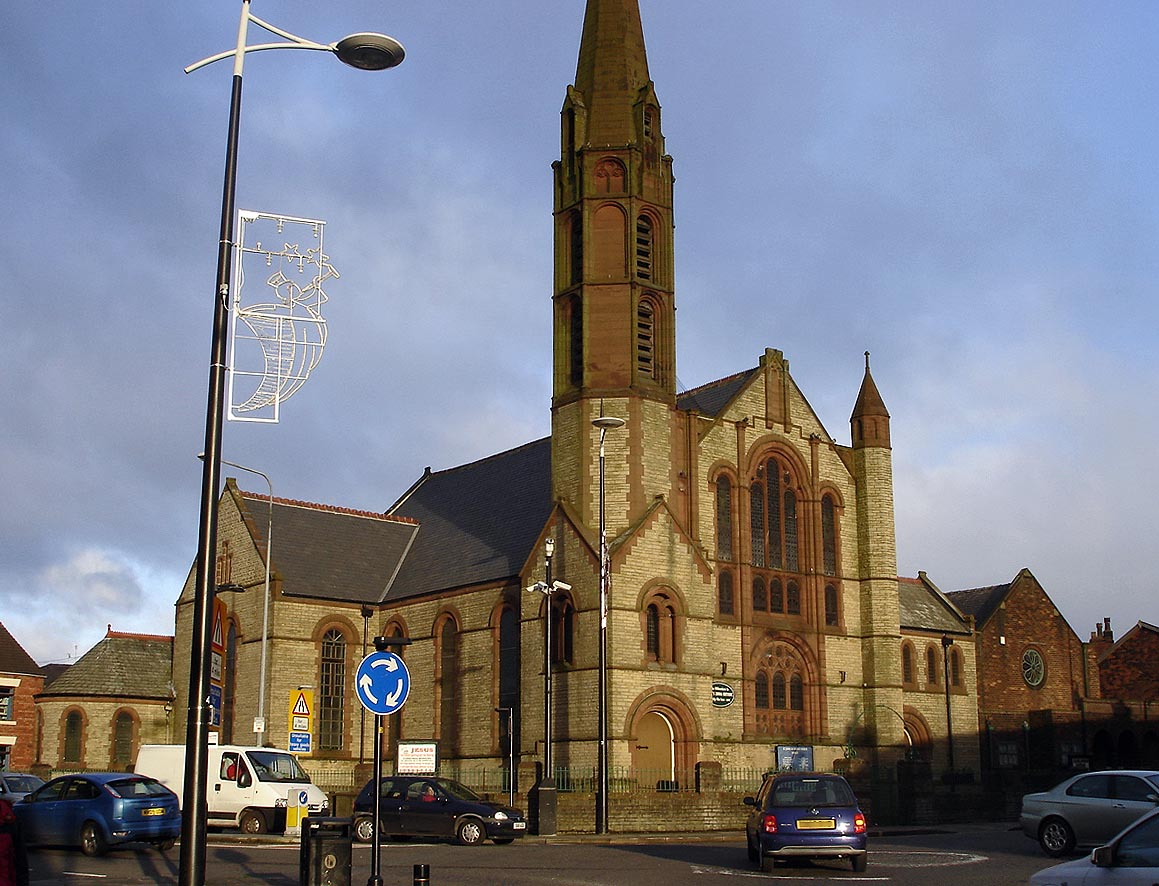
St John's Methodist Church.

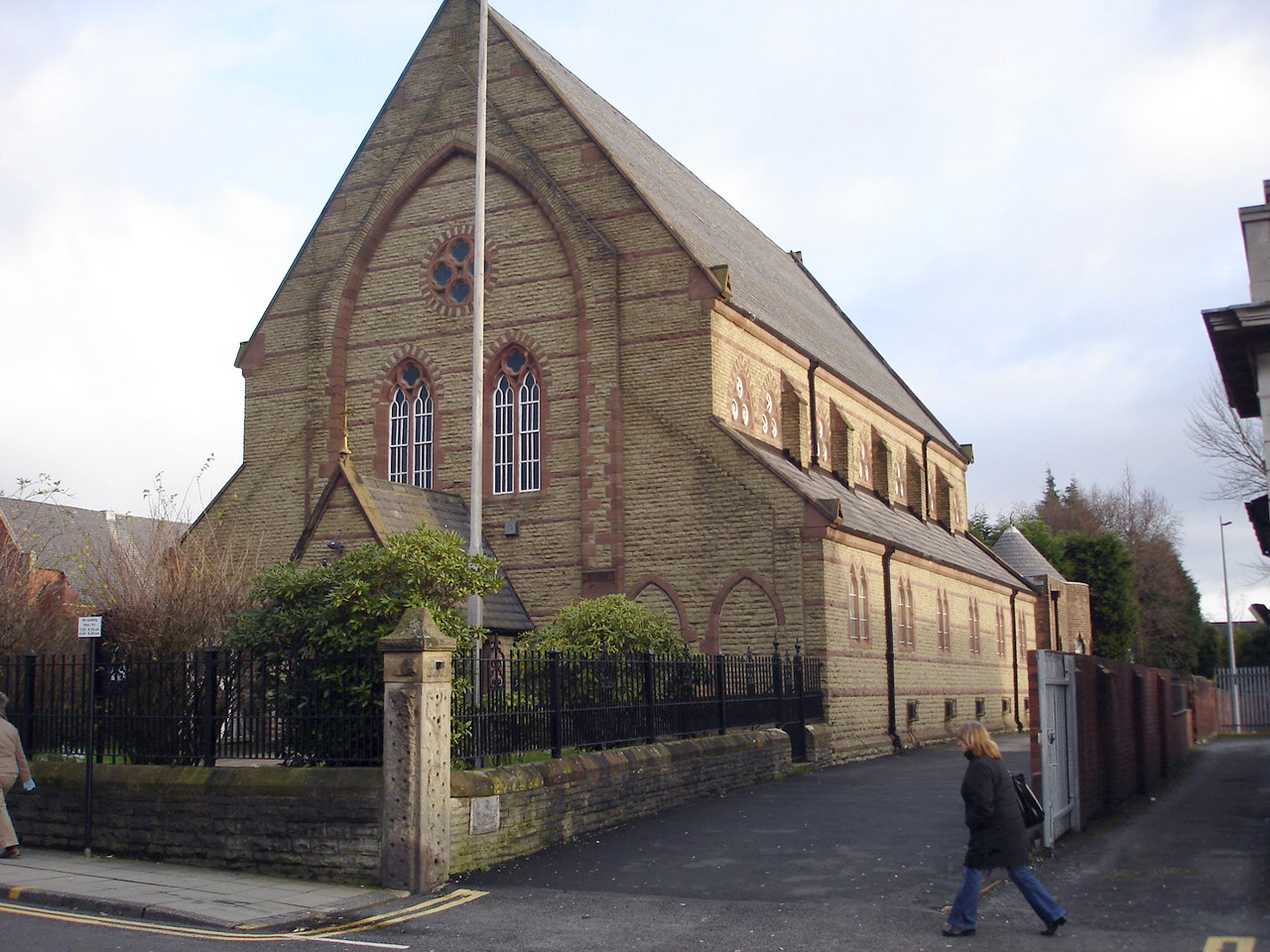
St Benedict's Catholic Church.

The first chapel was built by public subscription in 1641 on land given by George Green. It was built as a Chapel of ease to Wigan Parish Church with the blessing of the Rector of Wigan, Bishop Bridgeman. The church was originally Puritan, and its first minister, Thomas Tonge, preached the Presbyterian discipline. He was succeeded by William Williamson and James Bradshaw who was ejected for nonconformity in 1662. The chapel was unused for six years. It was consecrated in 1698 on All Saints' Day. All Saints' Church was rebuilt in 1766 and modifications made in 1863. It remains much the same as then, with an upper gallery and wide nave. There are windows dedicated to Hindley's families and an east window depicting early English saints.

St Peter's Church was built in 1866 and contained an organ by Edmund Schulze since replaced by an electronic organ. The clock tower contains a set of bells. The war memorial, outside, was unveiled on 4 November 1922 and was built in a simple style.

Hindley has a tradition of Methodism and non-conformity. The Wesleyan Methodists acquired land in 1846 and built a chapel in 1851. The United Methodist Free Church had two chapels at Hindley Green, Brunswick Chapel, built in 1855, and another in 1866. The Primitive Methodists had a chapel at Castle Hill, built in 1856. The Independent Methodists had a church at Lowe Green, built in 1867, and later on Argyle Street. The Particular Baptists built Ebenezer Chapel in Mill Lane in 1854, converted to a restaurant in recent years. The Congregationalists made an attempt to build a church in 1794, but no church was formed until 1812; St. Paul's Chapel was built in 1815, meetings for worship having been held some years earlier in cottages. Presbyterians built a chapel in 1698, the present congregation is Unitarian in doctrine. St John's Methodist Church at the top of Market Street was built in 1868. The Church of Christ in Argyle Street from the mid-1800s to present.

Nothing is known of the permanence of Catholicism during the 17th century, but mass was probably said at Lowe Hall as Dom John Placid Acton, a Benedictine, was stationed at this place in 1699 and died there in 1727. Succeeding priests, who till 1758 resided chiefly at Park Hall in Charnock Richard, or at Standish Hall, moved the chapel to Lowe Hall and then to Hindley village. From 1758 there has been a resident Benedictine priest in charge of worship and the present church of St. Benedict in Market Street was built in 1869. From 1948–62 the parish priest of St. Benedict's was the eminent composer and liturgist Dom Gregory Murray OSB.

The cemetery on Castle Hill Road was opened in 1879 and is divided into denominational sections and of note is the amount of masonic gravestones to be found throughout. Hindley has a long masonic tradition that still survives today.

== Landmarks ==
Leyland Library and Museum was built in 1886 by Thomas Worthington. It is designed in a Free-Elizabethan style and given to the people of Hindley by Nathaniel Eckersley, on the instruction of John Leyland upon his death.

The Bird I'th Hand public house at the main crossroads in the town and the Lord Nelson Hotel on Bridge Street both have 18th-century origins. The Lord Nelson is a Grade II listed building. The Last Orders pub, built in the 19th century, has painted red brick, a moulded brick eaves cornice and Doric doorcases.

No. 5 Deansgate is a rare surviving example of a modest vernacular cottage dating from the 18th century or earlier and illustrates a type once common in Hindley.

Borsdane Wood is a place of outstanding natural beauty and in 1986 was declared a Local Nature Reserve.

== Notable families ==
John Leyland (1832–1883), a mill owner and benefactor, was born in Mill Lane (Market Street) in 1832 to a family of cloth makers. He was a governor of Hindley and Abram Grammar School and published a history, "Memorials of Hindley" in 1873. He left his estate to Nathaniel Eckersley and instructed that it should benefit Hindley. It paid for extensions to the Grammar School and built the Leyland Public Library, and Leyland Park, on Park Road, Hindley.

Colonel Nathaniel Eckersley (1779–1837) of Laurel House on Atherton Road had a distinguished military career and served with Duke of Wellington (1769–1852) in Portugal in the Peninsular Wars where he constructed defences for Peniche and led numerous attacks. He saw action in the siege of Badajos and led the Engineers at the siege of Fort Piccurina where he was shot, mentioned in dispatches and invalided home. Among his trophies of war was a pair of duelling pistols, taken by troopers after the battle of Vittoria, from the carriage of Joseph Bonaparte, the King of Spain. He was a guardian of the poor and helped acquire an extension to the graveyard of Hindley Chapel.

Nathaniel Eckersley (1815–1892) left a legacy as a banker, mill owner, mine owner, J.P., M.P., mayor and magistrate. He formed the 21st Lancashire Rifle Volunteers as captain. In 1878, he served as High Sheriff of Lancashire. He married twice, his first wife died at an early age leaving two daughters. His second marriage provided three sons, the youngest lost his life in Burma.

James Carlton Eckersley (1854–1926), continued his father's philosophy and was instrumental in education and church welfare. He laid foundation stones at the new infants' school, All Saints, Hindley, St. Nathaniel's Church, Platt Bridge, the Hindley & Abram Grammar School, Conservative Club, Church of St John The Evangelist, Hindley Green, St. Nathaniel's Mission Church, Platt Bridge, and St. Nathaniel's School (infants). He was a J.P. He settled at Carlton Manor in Yeadon and was known as "the Squire of Yeadon". A charity continues named the "James Carlton Eckersley Charity".

Nathaniel Ffarington Eckersley (1857–1935) built the Western Mills at the Eckersley Mills complex. He realised the potential of ring spinning and became one of the biggest ring spinners in Lancashire. He served as mayor of Wigan, and as captain in the Boer War. He amalgamated his mill interests with his grandfather's company to form Eckersley's Ltd. He settled at Wem, Shropshire. In 1927 he gave the Leyland Free Library & Museum a memorial case, collected by his brother James Carlton. One year later, he opened the Eckersley Gardens at Poolstock, a memorial seat was placed in memory of his father. He was appointed High Sheriff of Shropshire in 1919.

The Penningtons were industrialists in the late 18th and mid-19th centuries. Their empire began with a single mill in 1822 which John Pennington expanded to six by the middle of the century. His son and grandson became powerful figures in the town, employing many of the population. Frederick Pennington (1819–1914) became a Liberal MP and supporter of many women's causes; Pennington's daughter Maria married Thomas Thomasson (1808–1876), the philanthropist, and another daughter was the mother of the suffragette Ursula Mellor Bright (1835–1915), who married Jacob Bright son of the famous orator John Bright (1811–1889). The Penningtons donated over half of the £9,000 required to build St Peter's Church in 1866 and to other improvements in the town.

== Other notable residents ==
Among other notable residents of Hindley are:

- Allen Parkinson (1870 in Hindley Green – 1941), coal miner and then politician, MP for Wigan 1918 to 1941.
- Lily Brayton (1876–1953), Shakespearean actress.
- John Stopford, Baron Stopford of Fallowfield (1888 in Hindley Green – 1961), a British peer, physician and anatomist, and Vice-Chancellor of Manchester University
- George Formby (1904–1961), music hall artist and 1930s film star, lived on Atherton Road as a boy.
- Vincent Aspey (1909–1987), first violinist of the New Zealand Symphony Orchestra
- John Crank (1916–2006), mathematical physicist, worked on the numerical solution of partial differential equations.

=== Sport ===
- Fred Broadhurst (1888–1953), footballer played over 240 games beginning with 107 for Preston North End
- Arthur Farrimond (1893–1978), long distance runner, competed in the marathon at the 1924 Summer Olympics .
- Ted Robinson (1903–1972), footballer who played 346 games ending with 237 for Wigan Athletic
- Syd Abram ((1906–1988), rugby league player, played 171 games for Wigan Warriors, the first try scorer in a Challenge Cup final at Wembley Stadium in 1929
- Syd Farrimond (1940–2022), footballer who played 538 games beginning with 404 for Bolton Wanderers
- David Grindley (born 1972), 400 metres track and field athlete, team bronze medallist in the relay at 1992 Summer Olympics.
- Anthony Stewart (born 1979), rugby league player, played 297 games beginning with 140 with St Helens.
- Paul Deacon (born 1979), rugby league player, played 379 games including 326 for Bradford Bulls
- Shaun Briscoe (born 1983), rugby league player, played 252 games and 11 for England
- Oliver Gildart (born 1996), rugby league player, played 194 games, beginning with 143 for Wigan Warriors

== Sports and leisure ==
Hindley has a long tradition in local sport with the town having amateur football, cricket and rugby league teams; the town's first association football club, Hindley F.C., was the first champion of the Lancashire Alliance (then called the Lancashire Junior League) in 1890. The town also has a long tradition of producing long-distance runners and cyclists of note. Arthur Farrimond, for instance, competed in the 1924 Olympic Games.

A new purpose-built sports pavilion has been built on Wigan Road, and Ashton Gymnastic Club are based in the town's main street. The town has a swimming pool and a local authority run leisure centre.

Hindley also has thriving youth-based groups including two Scout troops, Boys' Brigade, Guides and Brownies and Army Training Corps. Local schools also provide out of school clubs and activities.

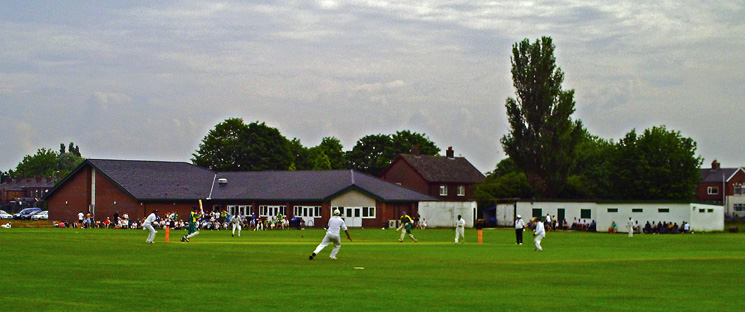
The new St. Peter's Pavilion (left) alongside the old cricket pavilion (right)

Hindley St. Peter's Cricket Club, participate in the Manchester and District Cricket Association, Southport & District League and West Lancashire League, and won the inaugural Manchester Association Twenty20 tournament in 2007 and the Manchester Association Premier League championship in 2008, retaining the title in 2009.

Hindley Amateur Rugby League Club has two Open age men's teams and is the fastest growing club in the northwest. Initially a National Conference division three and a Northwest counties division four team.

Hindley Junior and Hindley Town both run football teams at all ages from under six to under 16.

== See also ==
- Listed buildings in Hindley, Greater Manchester
