= Hatton (surname) =

Hatton is a surname. Notable people with the surname include:

- Angie Hatton (born 1972), American politician
- Ann Hatton (1764–1838), British novelist
- Barbara R. Hatton, American academic administrator
- Bob Hatton (born 1947), English footballer
- Bobby Joe Hatton (born 1976), Puerto Rican basketball player
- Campbell Hatton (born 2001), British boxer
- Charlie Hatton (born 1998), British cyclist
- Chris Hatton (born 1957), Australian politician
- Christopher Hatton (1540–1591), English politician, Lord Chancellor of England and a favourite of Queen Elizabeth
- Christopher Hatton (died 1619) (1581–1619), MP for Buckingham, Bedford and Huntingdon
- Christopher Hatton, 1st Baron Hatton (1605–1670), MP and prominent Royalist during the English Civil War
- Christopher Hatton, 1st Viscount Hatton (1632–1706), English aristocrat and diplomat
- Dave Hatton (born 1943), English footballer
- Dick Hatton (1891–1931), American silent film actor
- Denys Finch Hatton (1887–1931), British big-game hunter
- Derek Hatton (born 1948), British broadcaster and former Labour Party politician
- Edward Hatton (footballer), English footballer
- Edward Hatton (surveyor) (c. 1664 – after 1733), English surveyor, author of A New View of London
- Edward Anthony Hatton (1701–1783), English Dominican
- Elizabeth Hatton, 17th century society beauty
- Frank Hatton (disambiguation)
- Gibby Hatton (born 1956), retired American track cyclist
- Grady Hatton (1922–2013), retired American baseball player
- Henry Hatton (c. 1793–1853), Irish-born merchant, ship builder and politician in Nova Scotia, Canada
- Henry Hatton (Irish politician), represented Fethard (County Wexford) (Parliament of Ireland constituency) in 1793
- Henry Hatton (MP for Wexford), represented Wexford (Parliament of Ireland constituency) in 1727
- Jack Hatton (1995–2019), American judoka
- John Hatton (disambiguation)
- Joseph Hatton (1837–1907), English novelist and journalist
- Leonard W. Hatton Jr. (1956–2001), American FBI agent, killed in 9/11 attacks
- Les Hatton (born 1948), British mathematician and computer scientist
- Lloyd Hatton (born 1995), British politician
- Mark Hatton (cricketer) (born 1974), Australian cricketer
- Mark Hatton (luge) (born 1973), British luger
- Marion Hatton (1835–1905), New Zealand suffragist
- Matthew Hatton (born 1981), British professional boxer
- Maurice Hatton (1938–1997), British screenwriter and film director
- Michael Hatton (born 1951), Australian politician
- Ragnhild Hatton (1913–1995), Norwegian historian
- Raymond Hatton (1887–1971), American actor
- Ricky Hatton (1978–2025), British professional boxer
- Robert Hatton (Royalist) (died 1653), English politician and landowner
- Robert H. Hatton (1826–1862), American Congressman and lawyer
- Ronald Hatton (1886–1965), English horticulturist
- Rondo Hatton (1894–1946), American actor
- Stephen Hatton (born 1948), Australian politician
- T. Alan Hatton (born c. 1950), professor at MIT
- Tom or Thomas Hatton (disambiguation)
- Tyrrell Hatton (born 1991), English professional golfer
- William Hatton (pioneer) (1849–1894), Irish immigrant to the United States, early Carmel Valley, California, pioneer
- William H. Hatton (1856–1937), American lumberman and politician

== See also ==
- Hatten (name), given name and surname
