= Hatten (disambiguation) =

Hatten is a municipality in Lower Saxony, Germany.

Hatten may also refer to:

== People ==
- Hatten (name), a list of people who have the name Hatten

== Places ==
- Hatten, Bas-Rhin, a commune in the Bas-Rhin department in Grand Est in north-eastern France
- Hatten (Lesja), a mountain in Lesja municipality in Innlandet county, Norway
- Hatten Peak, a mountain peak in Queen Maud Land in Antarctica

== Other ==
- Hatten är din, an internet meme from 2000
