= Edward Hatton =

Edward Hatton may refer to:

- Edward Anthony Hatton (1701–1783), English Dominican apologist
- Edward Hatton (footballer), English footballer who played for Reading and Thames Ironworks as a centre forward
- Edward Hatton (surveyor) (c. 1644 – after 1733), English surveyor
