= Boar's Head, Standish =

Listed pub in Greater Manchester, England

Boar's Head
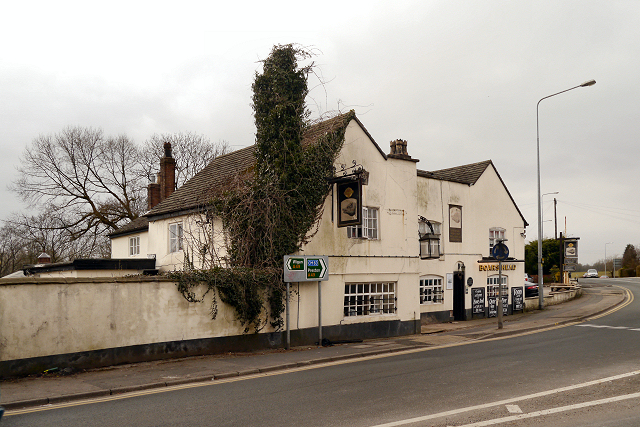
- The pub in 2013

- Location within Greater Manchester
- Former names: Boar's Head Inn
- Alternative names: Boars Head

General information
- Type: Public house
- Location: Wigan Road, Standish, Greater Manchester, England
- Coordinates: 53.5725°N 2.6405°W
- Year built: 17th century (probable)
- Owner: Marston's

Design and construction
- Designations

Listed Building – Grade II
- Official name: Boar's Head public house
- Designated: 9 August 1966
- Reference no.: 1163139

The Boar's Head is a Grade II listed public house on Wigan Road in Standish, a town within the Metropolitan Borough of Wigan, Greater Manchester, England. It is thought to date from the 17th century, according to its official listing, although a plaque installed by the Standish Community Forum claims the present building was erected around 1450 and refers to earlier use by travellers and later as a coaching inn. The Campaign for Real Ale (CAMRA) regards it as one of the oldest surviving pubs in the Wigan area. As of 2024, the freehold was owned by Marston's.

== History ==
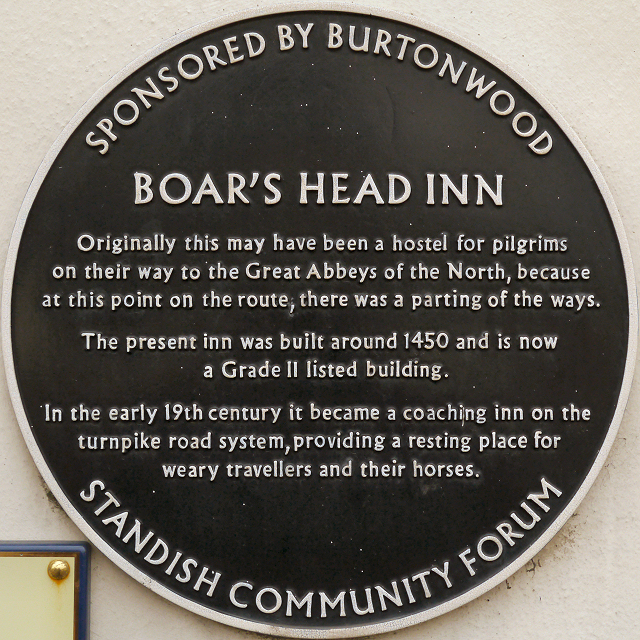
The plaque on the pub

The building was probably constructed in the 17th century, according to its official listing, although a plaque installed by the Standish Community Forum states that the present structure dates from around 1450. The plaque also suggests that an earlier building on the site may have served travellers on northern pilgrimage routes, and notes that the inn later became a coaching stop on the early-19th‑century turnpike road.

The 1894 and 1929 Ordnance Survey maps mark the building as the Boar's Head Inn.

On 9 August 1966, the Boar's Head was designated a Grade II listed building. According to the Campaign for Real Ale (CAMRA), it is one of the oldest pubs in the Wigan area. As of 2024, the pub's freehold was owned by Marston's.

== Architecture ==
The building is finished in plaster over brick and stone, with a roof of reconstituted stone slates. It has two storeys and three bays, with the left bay projecting under a gable and the right bay also gabled. A simple parapet runs along the front. The windows include horizontal sliding sashes on the ground floor, most with fixed upper panes, and casements above. The entrance has a round‑arched opening with the fanlight filled in. The left bay carries a gable with decorative detailing and the Standish coat of arms, while the central bay has a painted sign and an iron bracket for a former hanging sign. Chimney stacks rise from the centre of the roof and from the left bay.

== See also ==
- Listed buildings in Standish, Greater Manchester
- Listed pubs in Greater Manchester
