= Ainscough Crane Hire =

British crane hire company

Ainscough Crane Hire Ltd
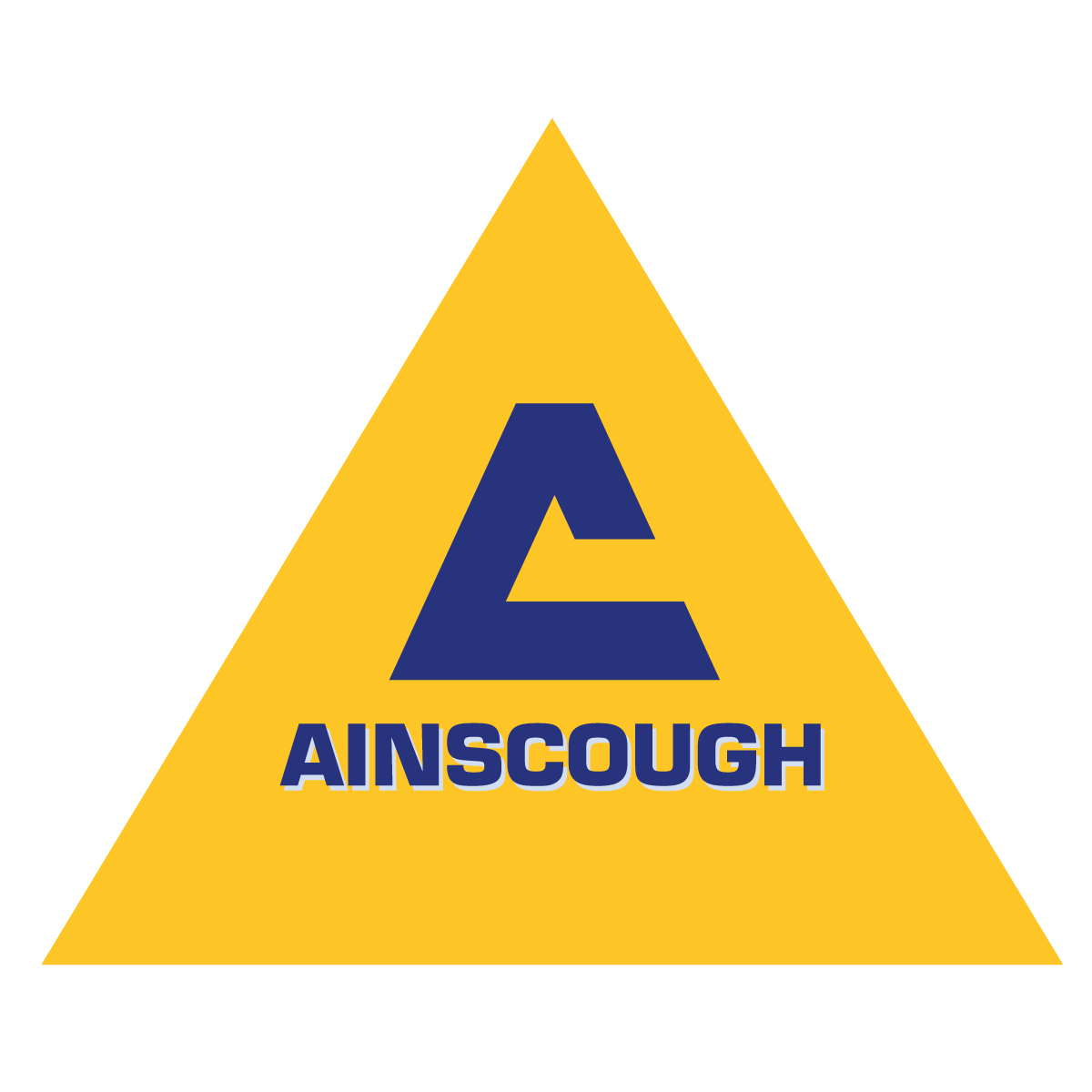
- Industry: Crane hire and lifting services
- Founded: 1976
- Founder: Gerald Ainscough
- Headquarters: Standish, Wigan, Greater Manchester, England
- Key people: Peter Gibbs (CEO)
- Number of employees: 888
- Website: Official website

Ainscough Crane Hire Ltd is a British lifting services provider headquartered in Standish, near Wigan, Greater Manchester. Established in 1976, it is the largest mobile crane hire and lifting solution company in the United Kingdom. As of 2024, Ainscough operates from around 25 depots nationwide and has a fleet of nearly 400 mobile, crawler and heavy-lift cranes. The company provides lifting services to the construction, infrastructure, energy and industrial sectors.

It expanded through acquisitions during the 1980s and 1990s and later underwent a buyout in 2007, ending family ownership. After a period of private-equity ownership and financial restructuring in the late 2010s, Ainscough undertook fleet investment in the early 2020s and reported a return to profitability, following several years of losses.

== History ==
Ainscough Crane Hire Ltd was founded in Wigan in 1976 by Gerald Ainscough. The business was established after the death of Gerald Ainscough's business partner, when the family decided to separate its crane activities from its scrapyard operations and create a dedicated crane-hire company. At its founding, the business operated a fleet of six cranes. By the early 1980s, the fleet had grown to 14 cranes, and in 1982 the company expanded beyond Standish for the first time by acquiring the yard of Jubilique Crane Hire in Salford. Gerald's sons, Martin, James and Brendan Ainscough, played a significant role in the company's development and had taken over its day-to-day management by 1984. Martin Ainscough began working in the family business as a teenager, leaving school at 15, and by 18 was managing operations and around 60 staff. Martin, unlike his brothers, never drove the cranes, preferring to work in the office, and later went on to be Chairman. By the end of the 1980s it was the largest crane hire company in North West England.

During the 1990s, the company grew through acquisitions, including Coventry Crane Hire and Diamond Crane Hire. Rapid expansion stretched the balance sheet, leading the Ainscough brothers to sell a minority stake. In 1993, venture capital firm Cinven acquired a 20 per cent stake in the company for £2 million. The investment marked a significant transition, introducing external oversight and the company's first non-executive director. The brothers later bought back Cinven's shares after three years. By the close of the 1990s, Ainscough had grown to a £30 million turnover with profits of £1 million. Within five years, turnover had risen to £80 million, generating a profit of £20 million. In 2000, the company acquired major competitor GWS. Ainscough was also involved in national infrastructure projects such as the Millennium Dome, The Gherkin and the redeveloped Wembley Stadium.

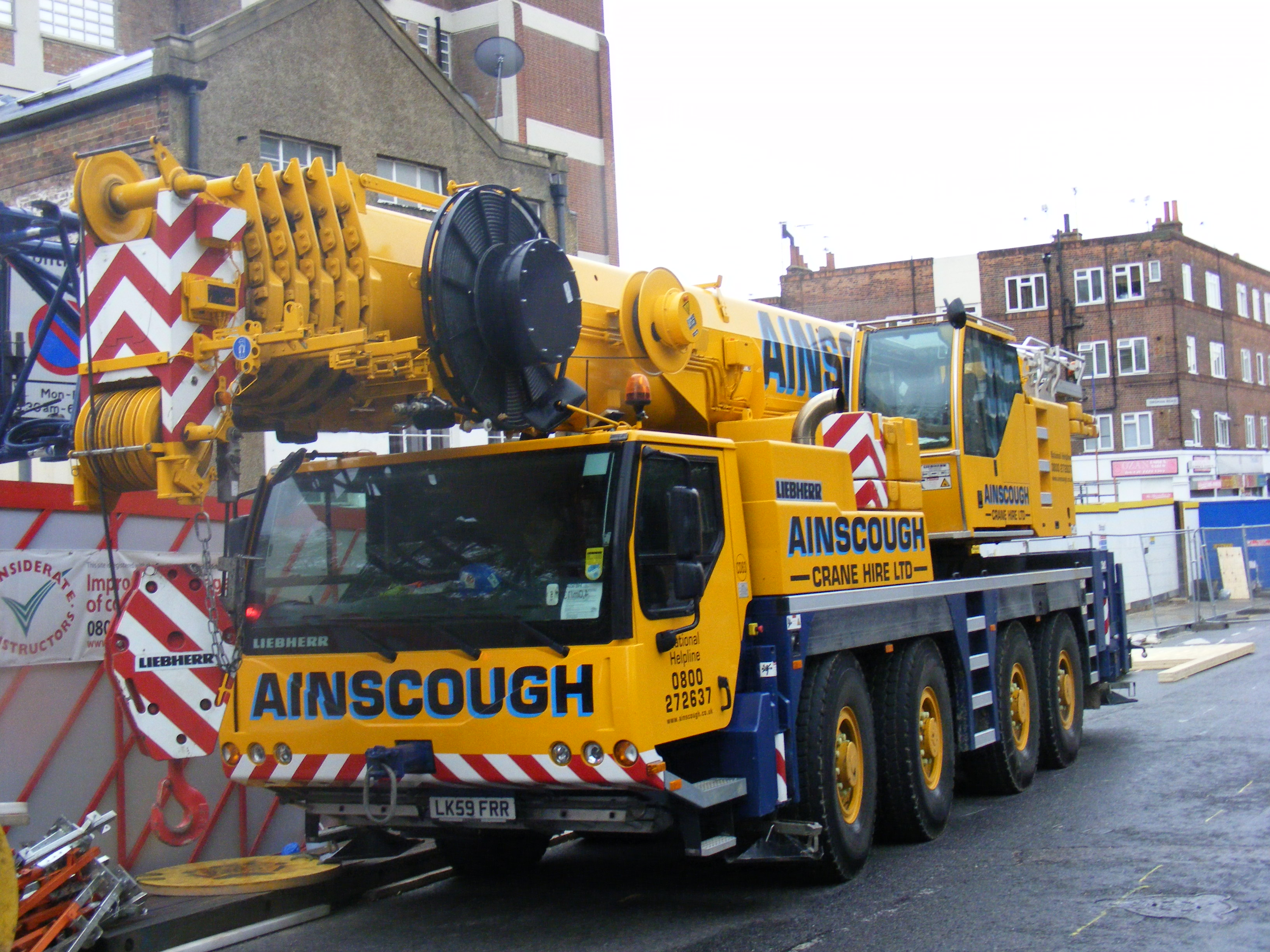
Ainscough's Liebherr LTM 1090-4.1 8 wheeler crane in 2011

In 2007, Ainscough was sold in a £255 million management buy-out backed by Bank of Scotland Integrated Finance. The transaction transferred ownership from the Ainscough family to the company's operational management, ending more than 30 years of family control. Prior to the sale, the Ainscough brothers held a 90% stake in the business, with the remaining 10% owned by company managers. The family continued to retain interests in other building services ventures and property holdings. At the time of the sale, Ainscough was the largest crane hire company in the United Kingdom, employing approximately 1,000 people, operating a network of around 25 depots, and running a fleet of about 500 cranes. In 2012, Ainscough was sold to Goldman Sachs and private equity outfit TPG. By 2013, Ainscough had increased its share of the mobile crane hire market from 29 per cent in 2007 to 34 per cent, while also targeting growth in the green energy sector. The company also featured in the BBC Two documentary series The Crane Gang, in 2013.

Ainscough underwent a series of ownership changes during the late 2010s as part of wider private-equity restructurings. By 2015, the company was owned by Oaktree Capital Management and operated a large fleet of mobile cranes in the United Kingdom. In September 2019, ownership transferred from Oaktree to GSO Capital Partners, a credit and private-equity arm of the Blackstone Group, following a financial restructuring.

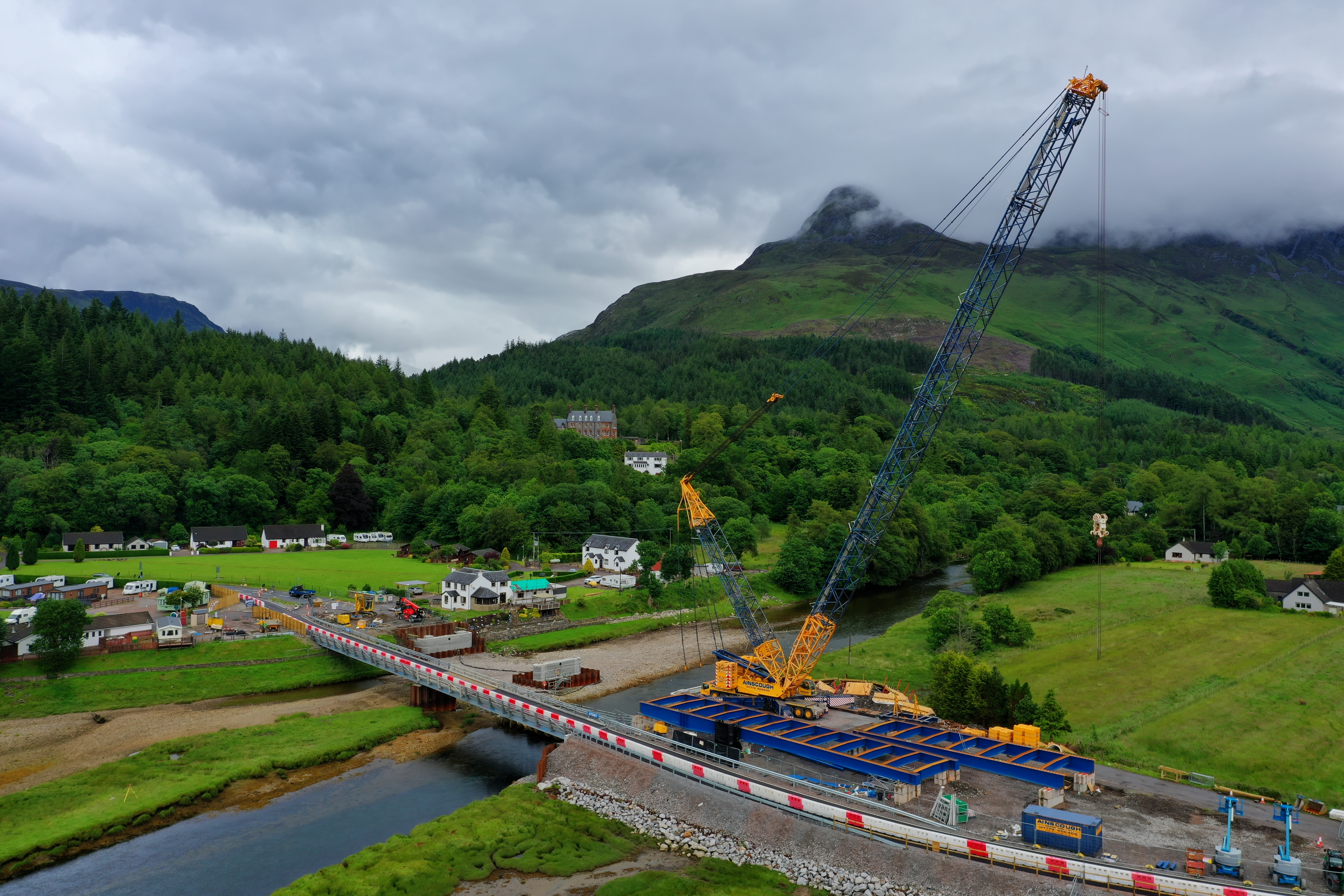
Ainscough's Terex-Demag TC2800-1 in 2022

Peter Gibbs has been Chief Executive Officer since 2020, having joined Ainscough as Chief Operating Officer in 2018. A former military pilot, he assumed operational leadership of the company during a period of private-equity ownership and financial restructuring and has overseen fleet renewal, and increased emphasis on safety and training.

In the year to September 2024, Ainscough reported a pre-tax profit of £11.3 million on revenue of £121.9 million, marking its second consecutive year in profit following six years of losses. The company invested £26 million in fixed assets during that period, including £24.5 million on new cranes.

== Equipment ==
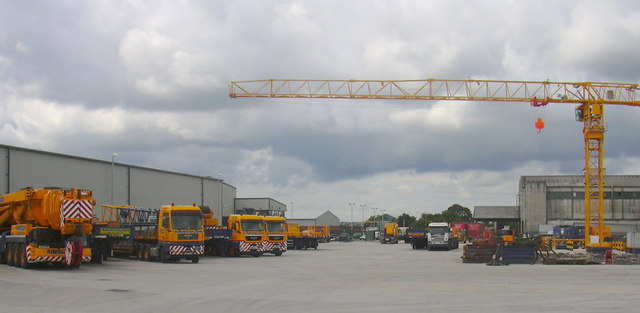
Ainscough's Heavy Crane Division in Leyland, 2009

As of 2022, Ainscough maintains a fleet of over 400 cranes and 30 HGVs nationally, including city cranes, all-terrain cranes, crawler cranes, mobile tower cranes, and heavy-capacity cranes up to 800 tonnes.

In 2022, the company became the first crane hire organisation in the world to commit to using hydrogenated vegetable oil (HVO) as fuel across its crane and heavy goods vehicle fleet. The adoption of HVO fuel is expected to reduce the company's carbon emissions by up to 90%, equivalent to more than 14,000 tonnes of carbon dioxide per year. Combined with broader environmental initiatives, this has enabled Ainscough to declare itself as carbon neutral from April 2022.

In October 2023, Ainscough added the first Liebherr LR 1700-1.0 crawler crane in the UK, a 700-tonne lattice boom model deployed at its Leyland depot, becoming the fifth lattice crawler in its fleet.

In November 2024, the company began standardising its fleet by taking delivery of seven Liebherr LTM 1230-5.1 and seven LTM 1300-6.3 mobile cranes, replacing older five- and six-axle models. The total fleet investment of fourteen cranes is part of a wider investment strategy, amounting to approximately £40 million.

== Locations ==
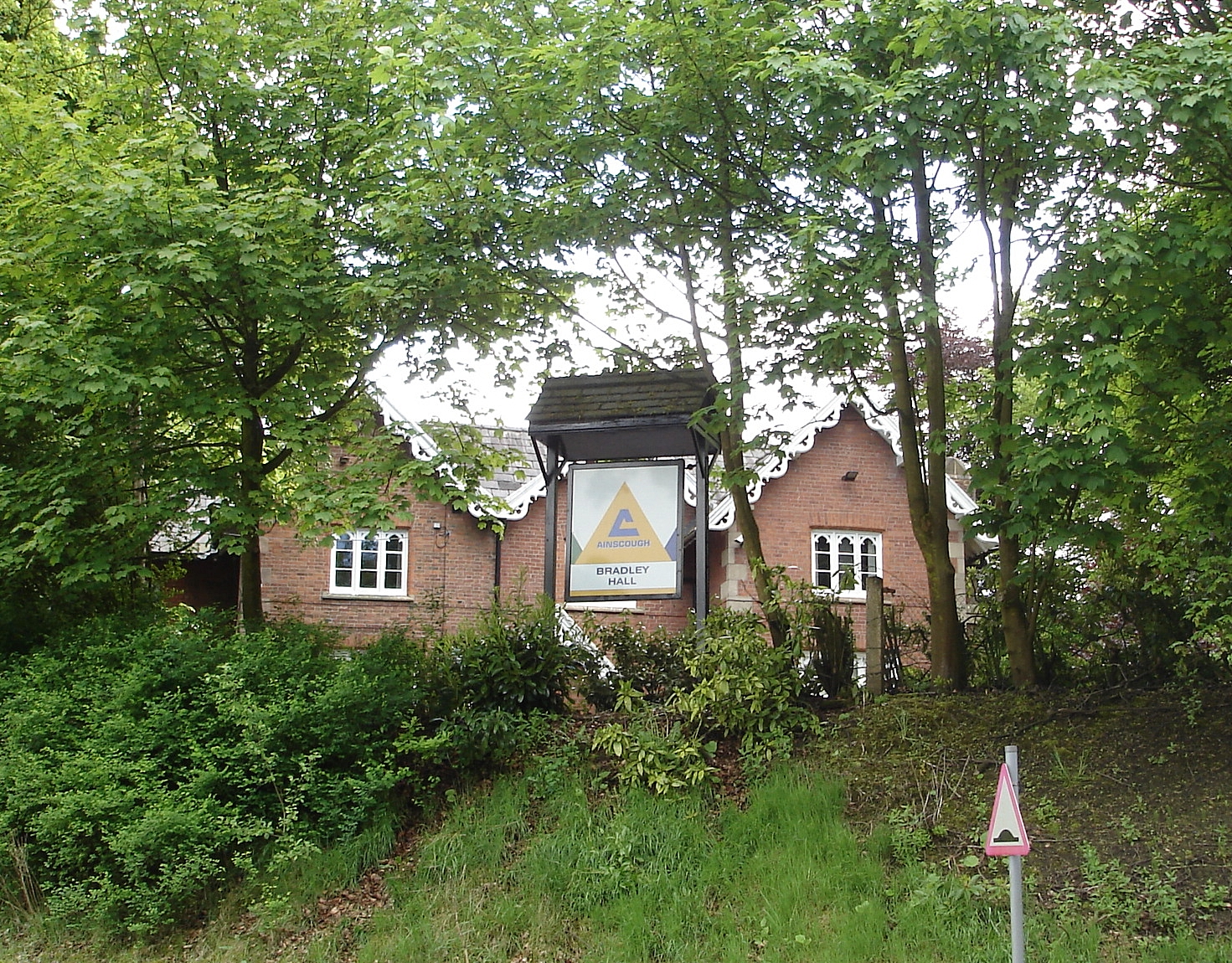
Ainscough's Head Office is the Grade II* listed Bradley Hall in Standish

Ainscough operates from approximately 25 depots across the United Kingdom, including Standish (headquarters), Leyland, Glasgow, Birmingham, Manchester, Stockton-on-Tees, and London.

== Awards and recognition ==
In June 2025, Ainscough was named one of The Sunday Times Best Places to Work, for the second consecutive year, reflecting high scores in reward, well-being, and management trust metrics.

In September 2024, the company received the Armed Forces Covenant Gold Award under the Ministry of Defence Employer Recognition Scheme, for its support for reservists and veterans. CEO Peter Gibbs is a former military officer with 16 years of service, a factor highlighted in the company's community engagement efforts.
