= Giant's Hall Farmhouse =

Listed building in Standish, Greater Manchester, England

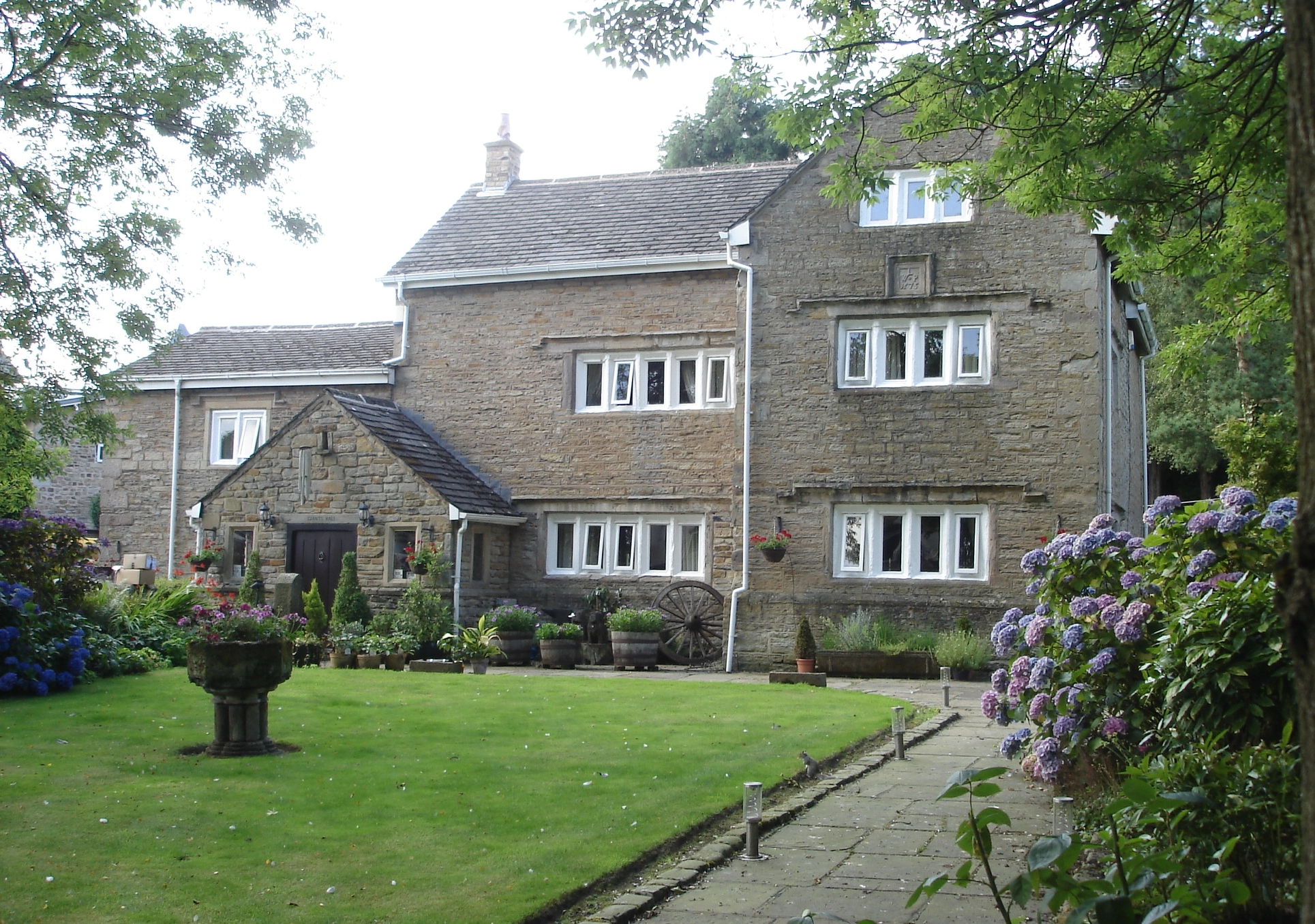
- Giant's Hall Farmhouse in 2014

- Location within Greater Manchester

General information
- Architectural style: Vernacular
- Location: Standish Wood Lane, Standish, Greater Manchester, England
- Coordinates: 53.5647°N 2.6554°W
- Year built: c. 1675

Listed Building – Grade II*
- Official name: Giant's Hall Farmhouse
- Designated: 9 August 1966
- Reference no.: 1287164

Giant's Hall Farmhouse is a Grade II* listed building on Standish Wood Lane in Standish, a village within the Metropolitan Borough of Wigan, Greater Manchester, England. Historically in Lancashire, it dates from the late 17th century and is recognised for its vernacular architectural character. The farmhouse remains in private ownership.

== History ==
A datestone on the building bears the inscription "WLP 1675", which is thought to refer to William Lathom and his wife Priscilla Yeates, early occupants of the property. The couple married in 1670 at St Wilfrid's Church and leased the farmhouse from Edward Standish II, then Lord of the manor. The date is associated with a significant phase of rebuilding, and architectural analysis has identified elements that may pre‑date this work, including features characteristic of the Jacobean or Elizabethan periods.

The Lathoms were connected to the influential Standish family, who held the manor for over 700 years. William Lathom died in 1691 and is commemorated on a brass plaque in St Wilfrid's nave.

The name "Giant's Hall" derives from large glacial boulders near the site, which local folklore claimed were placed by giants. One boulder, weighing five tons, was buried to facilitate farming operations.

On 9 August 1966, Giant's Hall Farmhouse was designated a Grade II* listed building for its architectural and historic significance. The property remains in private ownership, having been associated with the Gill family for over 150 years, except for a brief period between 1913 and 1921.

== Architecture ==
The building is constructed of dressed stone and has a reconstituted stone roof. The building is two storeys in height and arranged in three bays, with the first bay forming a lower extension and the third projecting forward beneath a gable. Its exterior features double-chamfered mullioned windows with label moulds. On the ground floor, the windows are arranged in groups of two, five, and four lights, while the first floor has two, six, and four lights. A three-light attic window occupies the third bay. Brick gable-end stacks and a lateral stack on the right return complete the external composition.

Inside, the farmhouse retains a number of period features. These include timber-framed partition walls and a large fireplace with an ovolo-moulded bressummer. Other features include Tudor-headed stone fireplaces and chamfered beams with stepped stops. At the foot of the staircase, an original six-panel door fitted with butterfly hinges also survives.

The farmhouse also includes a near-contemporary extension and retains a range of period detailing. It is characteristic of 17th-century vernacular architecture in Lancashire.

== See also ==
- Grade II* listed buildings in Greater Manchester
- Listed buildings in Standish, Greater Manchester
