= Thomas Hatton =

Thomas Hatton may refer to:

- Hatton baronets, of whom six were named Thomas Hatton, including
  - Sir Thomas Hatton, 1st Baronet (c. 1583–1658), English politician
  - Sir Thomas Hatton, 2nd Baronet (1637–1682), English politician
- Tom Hatton (actor), British actor and television presenter
- Tom Hatton (motorcyclist) (born 1986), Grand Prix motorcycle racer from Australia

== See also ==
- Tom Hatten (1926–2019), radio, film and television personality
- Hatton (disambiguation)
