= John Hatton =

John Hatton may refer to:

- John Hatton (bishop) (died 1516), English Anglican priest, Archdeacon of Nottingham in 1506
- John Hatton (cricketer) (1858–1915), English cricketer
- John Hatton (politician), Australian politician
- John Leigh Smeathman Hatton (1865–1933), English mathematician and university administrator
- John Liptrot Hatton (1809–1886), English musical composer, conductor, pianist, accompanist and singer
- Sir John Hatton, 7th Baronet (died 1740), of the Hatton baronets
- Sir John Hatton, 9th Baronet (died 1811), of the Hatton baronets
