= Animutation =

Form of web-based computer animation

Animutation or fanimutation is a form of web-based computer animation, typically created in Adobe Flash and characterized by unpredictable montages of pop-culture images set to music, often in a language foreign to the intended viewers. It is not to be confused with manual collage animation (e.g., the work of Stan Vanderbeek and Terry Gilliam), which predates the Internet.

== History ==
Animutation was popularized by Neil Cicierega. Cicierega claims to have been inspired by several sources, including bizarre Japanese commercials and Martin Holmström's "Hatten är din" Soramimi-style video made for the "Habbeetik" song by Azar Habib. The term animutation is a portmanteau of animation and mutation and was popularized in 2001 through Cicierega's flash animations such as Japanese Pokerap and Hyakugojyuuichi!!, which feature the credits music from older episodes of Pokémon. The popularity of Hyakugojyuuichi!! quickly made it an Internet phenomenon. Since that time, others have adopted a similar style and communities of similarly minded animators have sprung up around the web. These versions made by fans were christened "fanimutations".

== Recurring themes ==
=== Audio ===
Animutations can be based on songs of foreign, independent, or mainstream origin. Japanese songs were used in many of the original animutations by Neil Cicierega, but newer animutations use songs in a wide variety of languages, including English, Dutch and gibberish.

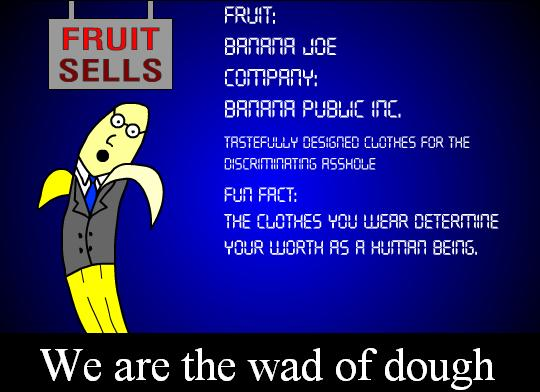
Screen shot from Irrational Exuberance (yatta), a popular animutation using the Japanese song "Yatta", known for classic examples of soramimi from "misheard" English lyrics

The foreign language songs are often "misheard" into English by the creators and added as subtitles. The words are not translations but soramimis, English words that sound roughly the same as the original lyrics. For example, the animutation title "French erotic film" is a soramimi of the original Dutch lyrics "Weet je wat ik wil" in an Ome Henk song. The actual translation of the lyrics is "Do you know what I want?"

=== Recurring motifs ===
Though animutations are close in relation to the random nonsense of dadaism and can be entirely unpredictable, they sometimes exhibit recurring memes among them as a result of being influenced by each other and internet culture. Among the many recurring motifs found in animutations are:

- The inclusion of Canadian comedian Colin Mochrie from Whose Line Is It Anyway? Regularly, a picture of Mochrie's head superimposed into a crudely drawn sun is also used. This inclusion is largely due to Neil Cicierega's fixation on the comedian.
- The inclusion of Harry Potter in various forms, often edited in a bizarre fashion. Neil Cicierega, also a creator of the Potter Puppet Pals, is responsible from the outset explosion of Harry Potter's use in animutation, most notably starting in Hyakugojyuuichi.
- Obscure pop-culture references, typically catchphrases or images.
- Random cartoon characters, usually from children's television programs or anime, although obscure characters are also used.

=== Non-traditional interfaces ===
While many flash animations have a "replay button" at the end, animutations often use a silly graphic which animates when interacted with, included with instructions on how to replay the animutation. For instance, at the end of Cold Heart, the title character is holding a package of Mentos mints, which serves as the replay button. The package slightly increases in size when moused over, and text at the bottom of the video informs the user to "Click the Mentos to replay!".

Similarly to the replay button, a progress animation is used in many animutations, especially the later creations. For example, in Jesus H. Christ, a papier-mâché goose which was originally in a Mystery Science Theater 3000 episode was used as a pointer, rotating clockwise to indicate the animation's playback progress.

== See also ==
- Yatta (song)
- YTMND, a genre of internet meme web pages usually pairing an image with an audio file
- Reanimated collaboration, wherein multiple internet users collaborate to recreate a film shot-for-shot
- YouTube Poop, a genre of videos in which existing footage is edited and remixed to humorous or surreal effect
- Internet meme
