= Listed buildings in Standish, Greater Manchester =

Standish is a town in the Metropolitan Borough of Wigan, Greater Manchester, England. It contains 22 listed buildings that are recorded in the National Heritage List for England. Of these, one is listed at Grade I, the highest of the three grades, two are at Grade II*, the middle grade, and the others are at Grade II, the lowest grade. The town and the surrounding countryside contain a variety of listed buildings, including three medieval cross bases, a village cross and stocks, houses, a church and associated structures, farmhouses, three mileposts, a drinking fountain, and two war memorials.

== Key ==
Grade	Criteria
I	Buildings of exceptional interest, sometimes considered to be internationally important
II*	Particularly important buildings of more than special interest
II	Buildings of national importance and special interest

== Buildings ==
Name and location	Photograph	Date	Notes	Grade
Cross base in Bank; 53.57375°N 2.66196°W		Medieval (probable)	The cross base is in stone, and consists of a square block with sides of 650 millimetres (26 in). On the top is a large socket.	II
Cross base, Beech Walk; 53.58056°N 2.66345°W		Medieval (probable)	The cross base is in stone, and consists of a square block with sides of 650 millimetres (26 in). On the top is a large socket. The cross base is partly buried.	II
Cross base opposite Westmead; 53.58134°N 2.66179°W		Medieval (probable)	The cross base is in stone, and consists of a square block with sides of 650 millimetres (26 in) and is 325 millimetres (12.8 in) in height. On the top is a large square socket.	II
Village cross and stocks 53.58685°N 2.66204°W		14th century	The oldest part are the cross base and the steps, the rest dating from the 18th or 19th century. The cross is in stone and has four square steps and a chamfered base. The cross is flat with a wider base, and the arms are splayed. The stocks have two stone posts with decorated heads and slots for two timber footboards.	II
Upper Standish Wood Fold Cottages; 53.57088°N 2.66106°W	—	Late 16th century	Originally one house, mainly timber framed, with sandstone walls, partly rendered, and a concrete tiled roof. Some mullioned windows remain, and most have been replaced. Inside the house is a large expanse of timber framing.	II
St Wilfrid's Church; 53.58718°N 2.66139°W		1582–1584 (probable)	The tower dates from 1867, and the east vestry was added in 1913–14 by Austin and Paley. The church is in stone, and its body is in Perpendicular style. It consists of a nave and chancel with a clerestory under a single roof, north and south aisles, a two-storey south porch, north and south chapels continuous with the aisles, an east vestry, and a west steeple. The steeple has a tower with square lower stages, angle buttresses, and a three-light west window. It broaches to an octagonal bell stage, with three clock faces in the broaches. Above this is an embattled parapet, gargoyles, and an octagonal spire. There are embattled parapets along the body of the church, at the junction of the nave and chancel are two octagonal stair turrets with ogival cupolas, there are pinnacles on the chancel, and a five-light east window.	I
Bradley Hall; 53.59394°N 2.65053°W		16th or 17th century	A timber framed house, encased in brick with stone dressings in the 19th century, and later used for other purposes. There are two storeys and three gabled bays, the third bay projecting. The house is on a stone plinth, and has quoins and decorative bargeboards. The windows are mullioned, those on the ground floor also with transoms, and the gabled porch has an entrance with a four-centred head. In the right return are two gabled bays with two-storey canted bay windows. Inside there is much timber framing and a bressumer.	II*
39 Market Place; 53.58671°N 2.66218°W		17th century	A stone house with quoins, a band, and a stone-slate roof, two storeys and two bays. On the upper floor are casement windows with gablets above. It was formally the Eagle and Child Inn up until 1916 when it lost its licence. Subsequently, it was converted into a butcher's shop and later a private residence.	II
Boar's Head public house 53.57258°N 2.64054°W		17th century (probable)	The public house is stuccoed, and has a parapet and a stone-slate roof. There are two storeys and three bays, the first and third bays gabled, and the first bay projecting. The doorway has a round head and a blocked fanlight. On the ground floor are horizontally-sliding sash windows, and above the windows are casements. Inside is an inglenook and a bressumer.	II
Old Seven Stars Farmhouse; 53.60333°N 2.67381°W		17th century	The farmhouse was later extended. It has three bays; the first is in stone, the second is in stone on the left and brick on a stone plinth on the right, and the third is in brick on a stone plinth. The outer bays are gabled and have two storeys, the right bay projects, and the middle bay has one storey. The roof is in stone-slate, and the doorway in the middle bay has a flat head. The windows are a mixture of casements and sashes, some of the latter are horizontally-sliding. At the rear is a wing with a blocked mullioned window.	II
Giant's Hall Farmhouse; 53.56468°N 2.65549°W		c. 1675	The farmhouse is in stone on a plinth, with quoins and a reconstituted stone roof. There are two storeys with attics, and three bays, the first being a lower extension, and the third a gabled cross-wing. The windows are mullioned with hood moulds. Inside there are timber framed partitions and a bressumer.	II*
Chadwick Farmhouse; 53.59970°N 2.67481°W		Mid-18th century	A brick farmhouse on a stone plinth, with stone dressings, a sill band, and a slate roof. There are two storeys, two bays and a rear stone outshut. The doorway and windows have gauged brick flat arches; the doorway has a fanlight and the windows are sashes. In the outshut are horizontally-sliding sash windows.	II
Rectory Farmhouse; 53.58892°N 2.64565°W	—	Mid-18th century	The farmhouse, which was later extended, is in brick on a stone plinth, with a brick band and a slate roof. There are two storeys and three bays. The doorway and windows have gauged-brick cambered arches. The windows are casements, one with a wedge lintel.	II
56 Wigan Road; 53.58205°N 2.65814°W		Early 19th century	A stone house with quoins, and a slate pyramidal roof with ridge tiles. It has a single storey, a double-depth plan, and one bay. The doorway has an architrave with imposts, a keystone, and a fanlight. There is a three-light window with a stepped head and mullions.	II
St Wilfred's Church Club; 53.58755°N 2.66126°W		1829	Originally a Sunday school, it is in stone with quoins and a slate roof. There are two storeys and four irregular bays. On the front are windows with pointed heads and a datestone with inscriptions, on the left return are external steps leading to a doorway, and in the right return is a doorway with a pointed head.	II
Milepost on railway bridge 53.57243°N 2.63948°W		1837	The milepost is in cast iron, it is fluted, and consists of a rectangular plate with a segmental head and cresting. It is inscribed at the top with "LANGTREE", and lower with the distances in miles to Wigan, Chorley and Preston. In 2020, the milepost was stolen by thieves and possibly sold for scrap.	II
Milepost outside Bleach Works; 53.58535°N 2.63762°W		1837	The milepost is in cast iron, it is fluted, and consists of a rectangular plate with a segmental head and cresting. It is inscribed at the top with "LANGTREE", and lower with the distances in miles to Wigan and Chorley.	II
Milepost outside No. 247 Preston Road; 53.59303°N 2.67128°W		1837	The milepost is in cast iron, it is fluted, and consists of a rectangular plate with a segmental head and cresting. It is inscribed at the top with "LANGTREE", and lower with the distances in miles to Wigan and Preston.	II
Jubilee drinking fountain 53.58453°N 2.66010°W		1897	The drinking fountain was built to commemorate Queen Victoria's Diamond Jubilee. The lower part is in stone and has a chamfered plinth with canted angles, a frieze and a cornice. On the sides are ogee-headed panels, and on the front is a lion's mask feeding a bow-fronted trough. On the returns are circular marble basins, and on the top is a cap and a cast iron lamp standard.	II
Standish pillar war memorial 53.58461°N 2.66024°W		1920	The war memorial stands in the Jubilee Memorial Garden on a road junction. It consists of a square three-stage stone plinth on two steps, with a column in polished granite surmounted by an urn. The monument is about 2 metres (6 ft 7 in) tall. On the plinth are inscriptions and the names of those lost in the two World Wars.	II
War memorial, St Marie's Church; 53.58458°N 2.67070°W		c. 1920	The war memorial is in the churchyard of St Marie's Church. It is in stone, and consists of Celtic cross with a crucifix. The cross shaft stands on a square, splayed, pedestal and a plinth, and at the base of the shaft is a carved wreath. There are inscriptions on the front of the wheel-base and on the plinth, including the names of those lost in the two World Wars.	II
Gatehouse, St Wilfrid's Church; 53.58684°N 2.66152°W		1927	The gatehouse at the entrance to the churchyard is by Austin and Paley. It is in stone, and consists of a two-storey centre, a lean-to bay on the left, and an octagonal turret on the right. In the centre is a moulded Tudor arched entrance with decorative spandrels. Above it is a canted oriel window with a decorated frieze, a decorated cornice, and an embattled parapet. The turret has mullioned and transomed windows and an embattled parapet. In the lean-to is an entrance with an elliptical head.	II
