= Marbleizing =

Creation of imitation marble effects

Marbleizing (also spelt marbleising) or faux marbling is the preparation and finishing of a surface to imitate the appearance of polished marble. It is typically used in buildings where the cost or weight of genuine marble would be prohibitive. Faux marbling is a special case of faux painting used to create the distinctive and varied patterns of marble - the most imitated stone by far.

Faux painting by Andre' Martinez in the Colorado State Capitol 2005

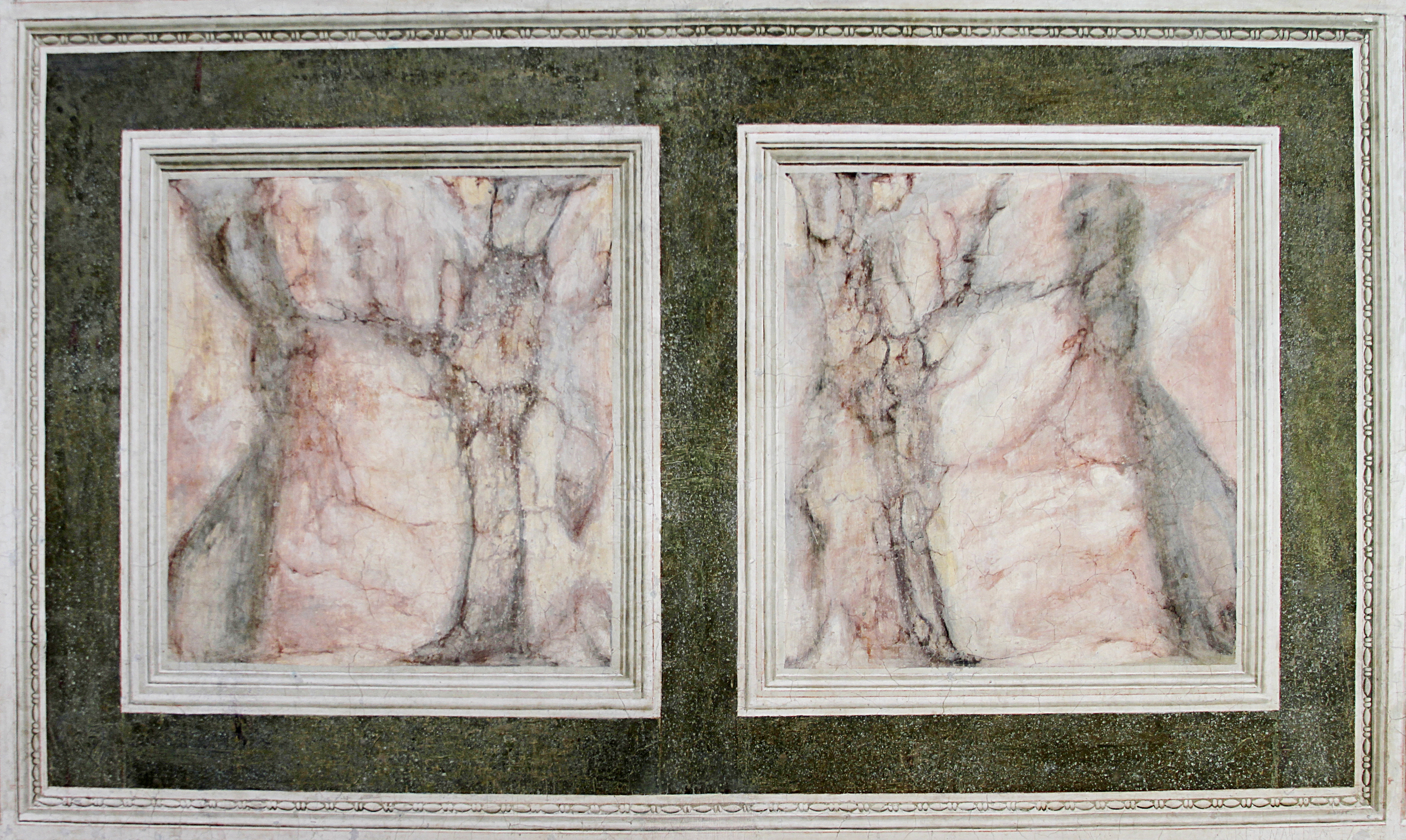
Giotto, Scrovegni Chapel.

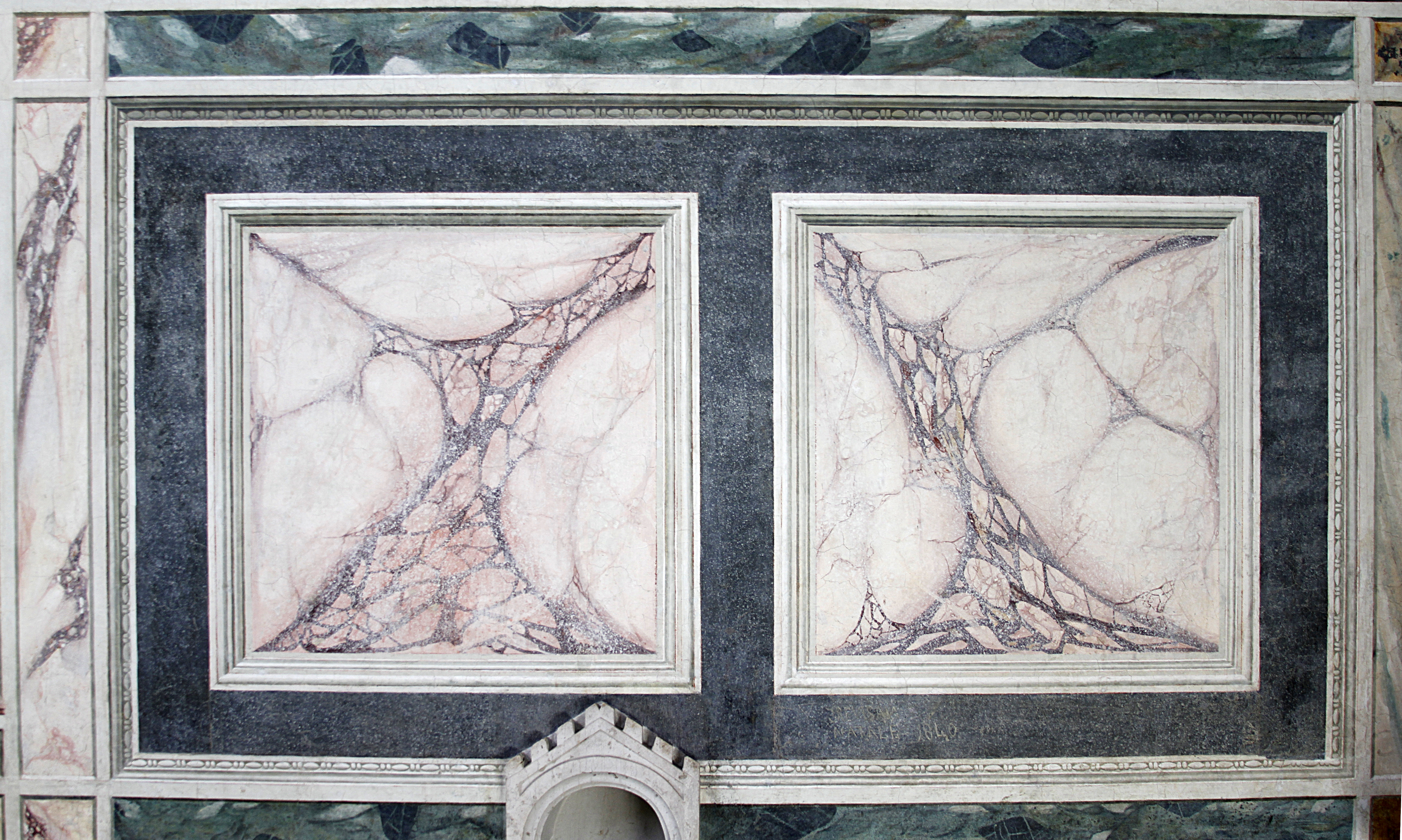
Giotto, Scrovegni Chapel.

== History ==
Faux stone painting was widely used in Pompeii, but it really took off in Europe during the Renaissance with two schools of faux painting developing. The Italian school was loose and artistic, the French school was formal and realistic. It typically took an apprentice 10 years or more to fully master the art.

The sophistication of the techniques are such that visitors are frequently unable to distinguish between false and real marble in many churches, palaces and public buildings in Europe. The techniques were perfected by the 17th century and have been used in all styles of construction well into the 20th century, including Baroque, Palladian, neoclassical and historical Revival styles as well as Art Nouveau and Art Deco buildings. Craftsmen who are able to replicate this work are still available, as evidenced, for example, by the extensive restorations of faux marble surfaces in important Eastern Europe buildings since 1990.

The art of marbling and graining reached its apogee in Britain between 1845 and 1870, and during this period the acknowledged master was Thomas Kershaw.

== Practitioners ==
=== Thomas Kershaw ===
Kershaw was born in Standish, Lancashire, England, in April 1819.

He achieved international fame, winning a number of prestigious awards at the major exhibitions of the age; The Great Exhibition, London, 1851 - a first prize medal; Exposition Universelle, Paris, 1855 - a first class medal; London Exhibition, 1862 - first prize.

Kershaw's work was often considered to be indiscernible from the original. He undertook work in many large houses, mansions and stately homes throughout England and Wales and once declined an offer from the Russian Ambassador to imitate marble on the interior of the Imperial Palace in St Petersburg. In 1858 he produced one of his important works in the Blue Room in Buckingham Palace where all the pillars were done in imitation marble.

=== William Holgate ===
In modern times, William Holgate (1931–2002) from Clitheroe, Lancashire, was possibly the finest grainer and marbler in the world since Thomas Kershaw held the title 150 years before. His achievements include the prestigious award known as the "Freedom of the City and Guilds of London" and was made “Freeman of the Worshipful Company of Painter Stainers of Trinity Lane, London," in 1995. He was also given the Lifetime Achievement Award at the 2001 Paris Salon.

== Techniques ==
Example of a faux painting in antique verde marble

Other techniques for producing faux marble include Scagliola, a costly process which involves the use of specially pigmented plasters, and terrazzo. For flooring, marble chips are imbedded in cement, then ground and polished to expose the marble aggregate.

Some professional faux finishers are very skilled and will use a variety of techniques to reproduce the colours, veining and luster of real marble or other building materials. However, many decorators will merely suggest the appearance of marble rather than accurately imitate a particular stone.

== See also ==
- Faux painting
- Paper marbling
