= Bradley Hall, Standish =

Listed building in Greater Manchester, England

Bradley Hall
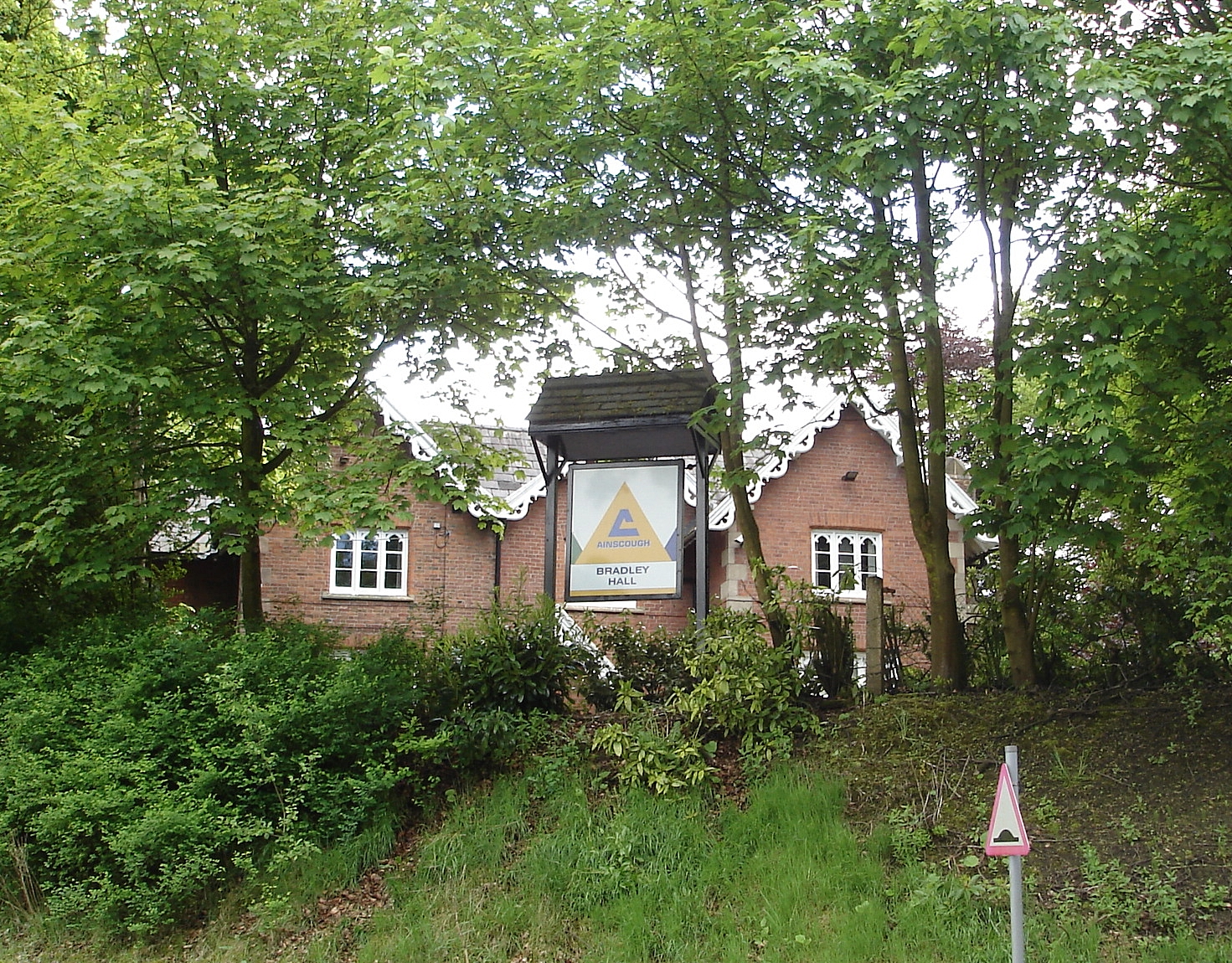
- Bradley Hall in 2016

- Location within Greater Manchester

General information
- Status: Converted to offices
- Location: Bradley Lane, Standish, Greater Manchester, England
- Coordinates: 53.5940°N 2.6504°W
- Year built: 16th or 17th century
- Renovated: Mid-19th century (encased)

Listed Building – Grade II*
- Official name: Former Bradley Hall public house
- Designated: 24 May 1982
- Reference no.: 1228439

Bradley Hall is a Grade II* listed building on Bradley Lane in Standish, a village within the Metropolitan Borough of Wigan, Greater Manchester, England. Historically part of Lancashire and originally a timber-framed house, it was encased in brick with stone dressings in the mid‑19th century and later operated as a public house. Listed in 1982 for its architectural and historic interest, it is now used as office accommodation.

== History ==
Bradley Hall dates from the 16th or 17th century and was originally constructed as a timber-framed house. In the mid-19th century, the building was encased in brick with stone dressings, a phase of Victorian alteration that incorporated elements of the earlier structure. The hall later served as a public house, known as the Bradley Hall.

On 24 May 1982, Bradley Hall was designated a Grade II* listed building for its architectural and historic significance.

Bradley Hall is currently used as office accommodation within the Bradley Hall Trading Estate. As of 2026, it serves as the head office of Ainscough Crane Hire.

== Architecture ==
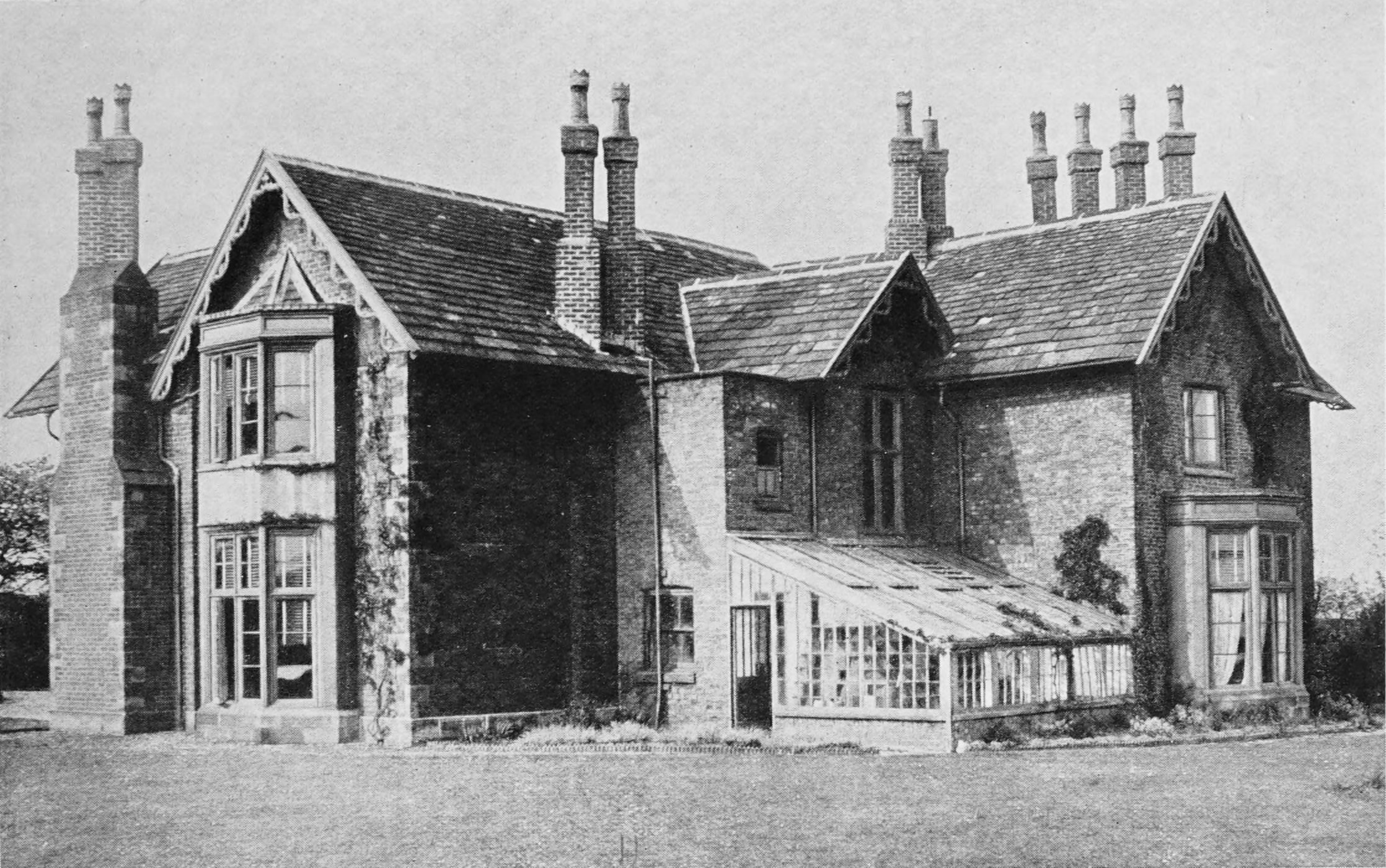
Bradley Hall, early 20th century

The building is a two-storey structure with three gabled bays, the third bay projecting forward. It stands on a stone plinth and features stone quoins and decorative bargeboards. The windows are mullioned, with those on the ground floor incorporating transoms, and all lights are cusped. The gabled porch includes an entrance with a four-centred arch and a half-glazed door.

Internally, substantial remains of the original timber-framed structure survive. These include ovolo-moulded beams and posts on both floors, as well as a ground-floor room with moulded beams. A fireplace bressummer is present alongside a later stone fireplace with a herringbone brick back. On the first floor, king post and strut trusses rest on wall posts, illustrating the building's historic construction methods.

== Location ==
The hall stands on elevated, wooded land within Bradley Hall Trading Estate, an industrial area in Standish. The estate contains light-industrial and office units, and businesses have occupied the site for several decades.

In recent years, part of the former trading estate to the west of the hall has been cleared following the demolition of industrial units, leaving the land vacant. This brownfield section is now subject to redevelopment plans, including approved proposals for the construction of 155 homes. The remainder of the trading estate continues to operate as an employment site.

== See also ==
- Grade II* listed buildings in Greater Manchester
- Listed buildings in Standish, Greater Manchester
