= The Crane Gang =

- Genre: Factual
- Directed by: Rob McCabe
- Narrated by: John Thomson
- Composer: Miguel d'Oliveira
- Country of origin: United Kingdom
- Original language: English
- No. of series: 1
- No. of episodes: 3 (list of episodes)

Production
- Executive producers: Samantha Anstiss; Maxine Watson; Matthew Gordon; Jamie Isaacs
- Producer: Emma Love
- Running time: 60 minutes
- Production company: Avalon Group

Original release
- Network: BBC Two; BBC Two HD
- Release: 22 September – 6 October 2013

The Crane Gang is a British documentary television series that first broadcast on BBC Two on 22 September 2013. The final episode aired on 6 October 2013.

== Episode list ==
No.	Title	Directed by	Original release date	UK viewers (millions)
1	"Episode 1"	Rob McCabe	22 September 2013	1.24
2	"Episode 2"	Rob McCabe	29 September 2013	0.925 (overnight)
3	"Episode 3"	Rob McCabe	6 October 2013	0.992 (overnight)

== Reception ==
=== Ratings ===
The first episode attracted 1.24 million viewers on BBC Two. It was watched by 4.5% of television viewers during its broadcast. Overnight figures show that the second episode was watched by 925,000 people, with an audience share of 3.7%. The final episode received 992,000 viewers and a 4.0% share of the audience.

=== Critical reception ===
Time Out gave the series two stars out of five and noticed a move towards documenting working lives recently (Ice Road Truckers, The London Markets and The Call Centre have been broadcast recently). Jane Rackman of Radio Times called it "terrific viewing for fans of shows like Monster Moves – and there are as many characters as on Ice Road Truckers - while the sight of a German construction fair bristling with gigantic cranes is simply astounding." The Daily Telegraph named it in an article about terrible television shows and said: "The hi-viz crane jockeys of Manchester’s Ainscough Crane Hire are no doubt very good at their jobs, and if you ever want a wind turbine or a Barbara Hepworth moving from A to B, they’d definitely be the people to call. But are their day-to-day lives truly deserving of their own TV showcase? Only if you’re Alan Partridge."
