= Standish Community High School =

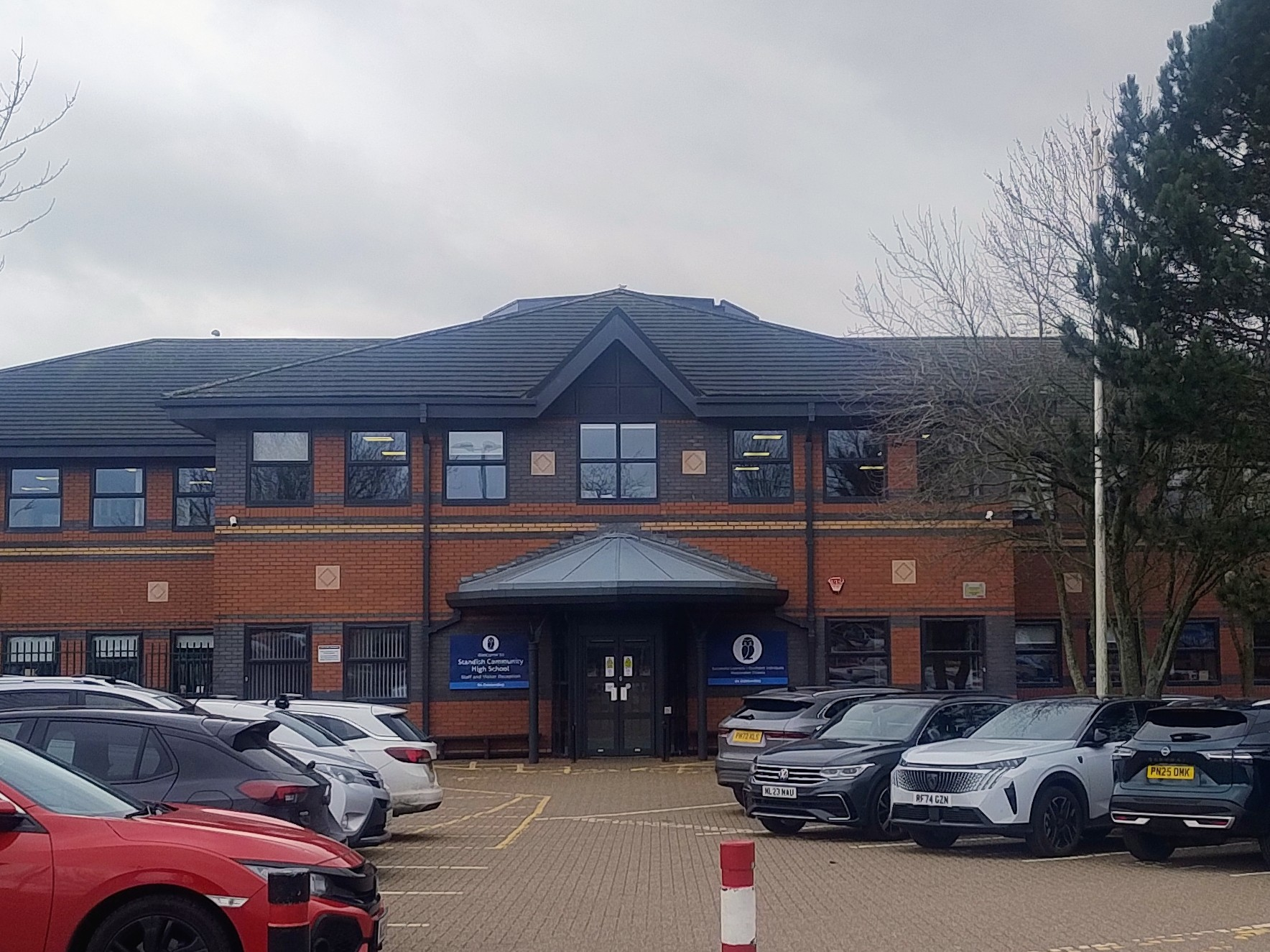
- Entrance to Standish High

Location
- Kenyon Road; Standish, Wigan; Greater Manchester, WN6 0NX; England; 53°35′28″N 2°40′27″W

Information
- Type: Academy
- Motto: Be Outstanding
- Established: 1978; 48 years ago
- Local authority: Wigan Council
- Trust: Mosaic Academy Trust
- Department for Education URN: 143812 Tables
- Ofsted: Reports
- Headteacher: Lindsey Barker
- Staff: 147
- Gender: Coeducational
- Age: 11 to 16
- Enrolment: 1280 (2019–20)
- Capacity: 1250
- Website: Official website

Standish Community High School – known locally as Standish High – is a coeducational secondary school located in Standish in the Metropolitan Borough of Wigan, Greater Manchester, England.

The school has approximately 1,250 students aged 11–16 in Key Stages 3 & 4 and has specialisms in Languages, Maths and Computing. The current headteacher is Mrs Lindsey Barker, who took over the position from Andrew Pollard in 2018.

It teaches the following subjects to GCSE level: English, Maths, Science and Triple Science, Art, Photography, Music, Drama, Media, MFL (including French and Spanish), Technology, Physical Education, Religious Education, History, Geography, Computer Science and ICT.

== History ==
The school was founded in 1978. In 1985, it faced the prospect of closure due to low student enrolment, although numbers later recovered. It began a major building and remodelling programme in 1989, and in 1992 opened up new facilities for science, art, and design technology. Standish Community High School has been a Language College since 1996. It has a replica continental high street in the Languages department, complete with shops, stalls, and a bank, which can be used for teaching and learning or booked out by other schools and colleges. By the turn of the millennium it was oversubscribed and had been described as "very effective".

Formerly a community school administered by Wigan Metropolitan Borough Council, Standish Community High School converted to academy status in December 2017. The school is now sponsored by the Mosaic Learning Trust, a multi-academy trust operating in partnership with Southlands High School and Golborne Community Primary School after plans were approved by the Department for Education.

The school is known in the region for its consistently good grades, achieving 79% in grades 9–4 in Maths and English in 2024. The school is also very well known in the Wigan Borough due to outstanding Ofsted reports which describe the school as "a good school", with some "outstanding" features such as safeguarding.

== Sport ==
Standish Community High School has many successful sports teams such as: football, rugby, badminton, table tennis, netball and basketball.

In 2022, the Year 8 rugby league team earned Team of the Year at the Believe Sports Awards in Wigan, this was after an unbeaten season where they also won the National School Champions on as well as winning the North West Schoolboys Trophy and the Wigan Schools Cup. The Year 10 team also won the National Schools Championship in 2024, having also won the treble of Wigan and North West championships.

In the 2024/25 academic year, the school was awarded the School Games Gold Mark, awarded in honour of excellent participation rates and high-quality output within competitive activities. Standish ranks as 105th nationally in the Top Sports Schools of 2024.

== Headteachers ==
Mrs Lindsey Barker (2018–)

Mr Andrew Pollard (2014–2018)

Mrs Lynne Fox (2010–2014)

Mr Hugh Crossan (2005–2010)

Mr Geoff Ashton (1984–2005)

Mr Martin Buttler (1978–1984)
