= Thomas Kershaw =

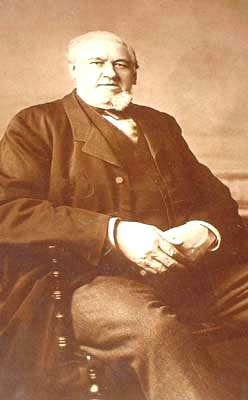
Thomas Kershaw in c. 1880s

Thomas Kershaw (1819–1898) was a leading British pioneer of marbleising, the creation of imitation marble finishes.

He was born in Standish, Lancashire. From the age of 12, he served as an apprentice in Bolton to John Platt, a painter and decorator. During his nine-year apprenticeship, he bought graining tools with money earned from painting pictures and developed his skills in the art of wood graining. After completing his apprenticeship, he moved first to Manchester, then to York, and finally to London in 1845. There he was employed by William Cubitt and Company, becoming their leading wood grainer.

In the mid-1840s, Kershaw left Cubitts to be independent and exhibited his imitation marble panels at the Great Exhibition of 1851, which won him a prize. At the Paris Exposition Universelle of 1855, he won a gold medal but felt obliged to carry out public demonstrations of his craft in the exhibition hall after accusations that he was using some type of fraudulent transfer technique. On his return, he bought a house on Baker Street and set up his own specialist decorating company.

The Journal de Manuell de Painteurers published on Kershaw in September 1855: "We regret that our inferiority to the Englishman is incontestable, and have to acknowledge that his panels must be regarded as masterpieces".

Kershaw was given several lucrative contracts, including one from the royal family to marbleise the columns at Buckingham Palace and Osborne House, but turned down a request from the Russian Ambassador to marbleise the interior of the Imperial Palace in St Petersburg. In 1862 he won another gold medal at the London Exhibition and was elected a liveryman in the Painter-Stainers Company for thirty-eight years. In 1860 he was granted the Freedom of the City of London.

He died a wealthy man in 1898, leaving £158,267 to his beneficiaries, which is around equivalent to £14,000,000 in 2021. He married Mary Atkinson in 1845 in Wigan, and they had four daughters.

== Work ==
- Emperor's Room, Buckingham Palace (1858)
- Baron de Rothchild's mansion
- Great Western Hotel, Paddington, London
- Dorchester House, Park Lane, London (demolished, 1929)
- Manley Hall, Manchester (demolished, 1905)

Examples of his work are on show in Bolton Museum and the Victoria and Albert Museum.
