= St Wilfrid's Church, Standish =

Coordinates: 53.5872°N 2.6614°W

Church of St Wilfrid, Standish
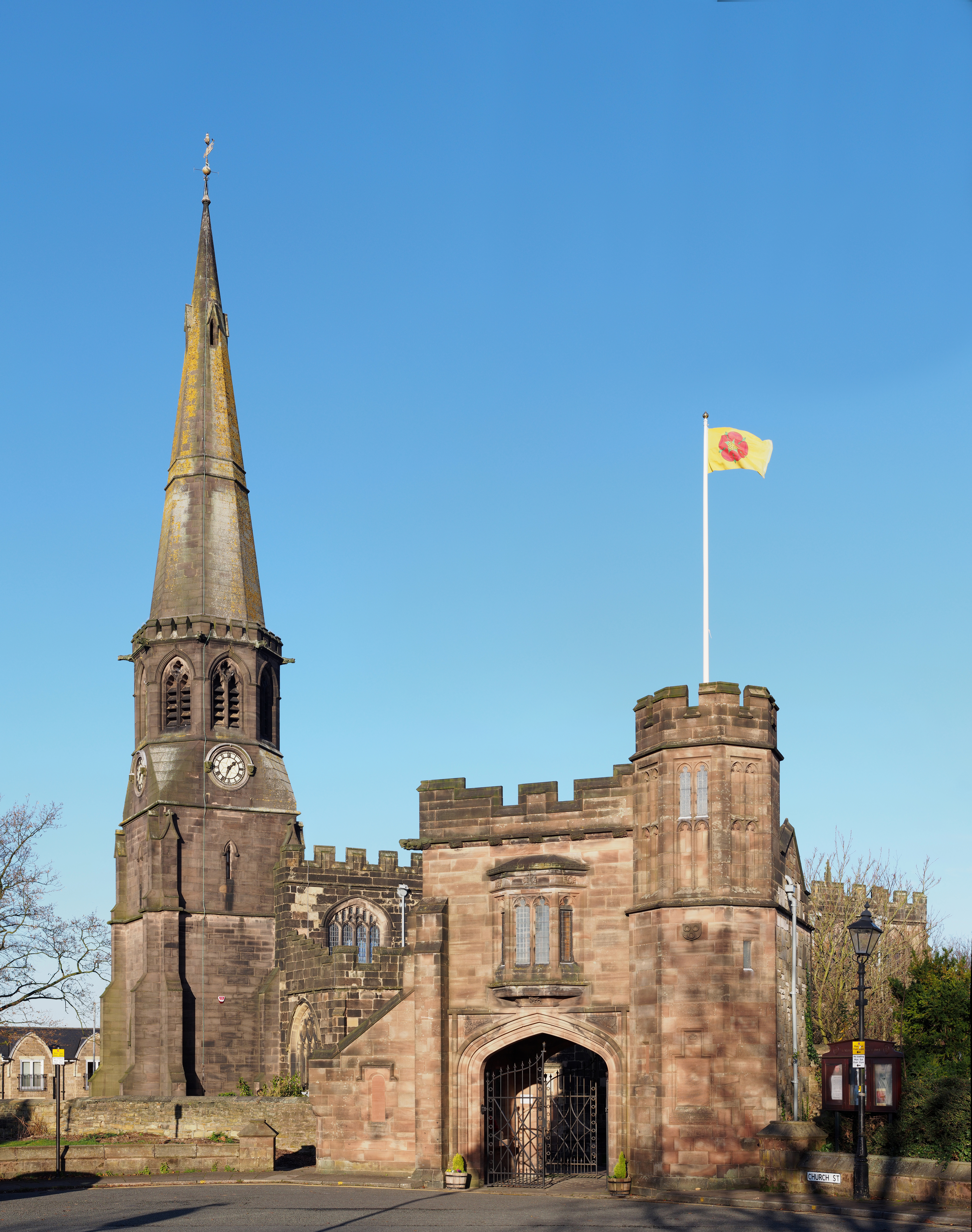
- Church of St Wilfrid, Standish

- Location in Greater Manchester
- OS grid reference: SD 563,103
- Location: Market Place, Standish, Wigan, Greater Manchester
- Country: England
- Denomination: Anglican
- Website: St Wilfrid, Standish

History
- Status: Parish church

Architecture
- Functional status: Active
- Heritage designation: Grade I
- Designated: 9 August 1966
- Architect: Lawrence Shipway (?)
- Architectural type: Church
- Style: Gothic and Renaissance

Administration
- Province: York
- Diocese: Blackburn
- Archdeaconry: Blackburn
- Deanery: Chorley
- Parish: Standish

Clergy
- Rector: Andrew Holliday

The Church of St Wilfrid is in Market Place, Standish, Wigan, Greater Manchester, England. It is an active Anglican parish church in the Diocese of Blackburn. It is recorded in the National Heritage List for England as a designated Grade I listed building. The authors of the Buildings of England series describe it as "one of the most interesting churches in Lancashire".

== History ==
The church is first mentioned in 1205 but the vast extent of the ancient parish with its eleven townships (Adlington, Anderton, Charnock Richard, Coppull, Duxbury, Heath Charnock, Langtree, Shevington, Standish, Welch Whittle and Worthington) points to a very early foundation.

The Pilkington family of Lancashire have a long-standing connection to the church and mention is made in 1322 when Robert, heir of the Pilkington estates and his brother Adam in dispute with John De Dichfield and his brothers was agreed to be settled by the decision of Henry Le Walys, the Chaplain of Standish. The Rector of Standish was Roger Standish in 1477 and was in that year the last surviving trustee of the estates of Alexander Pilkington in Rivington and Mellor. He released the estates to the beneficiary being Roger Pilkington, who was Alexanders grandson on him attaining the age of majority. Roger Pilkington settled at Rivington where he made immediate improvements to Rivington Hall.

Of the three chantries inside the Church, the Chantry of the Blessed Virgin Mary was the earliest and was created in 1301, others were added later including the Altar of Our Lady, Chantry at the Altar of St. Nicholas and the Chantry of the Holy Cross otherwise known as the Rood Altar.

The chantry at the altar of St Nicholas founded 1478 in the north aisle recorded formerly by a brass plate with an inscription in Latin to the effect that Robert Pylkington had been custodian and chaplain of this chantry and gave to the chantry a yearly revenue of six marks. He died on 6 May 1498. James Nevore was chantry priest at the date of the Commissioners' Report, and the chantry was endowed with land in Rivington, Whittle, Adlington, and Heath Charnock. The lands held at Rivington were purchased from the crown in 1583 by Thurston Anderton and included Higher Knowle farm, Lower Knowle farm and Grut farm, once located opposite the entrance of the current Rivington and Blackrod High School. The possession by the Crown was in consequence of the Abolition of Chantries Act 1547. An earlier record of 1574 recovering rents for the same properties to the benefit of the school suggests freehold and leasehold. It is likely the grant of the land dated to the time of the Pilkington endowment in 1478.

The present church is believed to have been rebuilt between 1582 and 1584 and designed by Lawrence Shipway. It is in a blended Gothic and Renaissance style.

During the 20th century, the Lancaster architects Austin and Paley carried out work on the church. In 1913–14 they added vestries at the east end of the church, and in 1926 they built a gatehouse at the entrance to the churchyard. The gatehouse is listed separately from the church at Grade II. The architects also supervised minor additions and repairs to the church in 1932 and 1939.

In 2025, a major restoration of the 130-foot Victorian era spire was completed, completed at the cost of £500,000, with around half the money raised by locals. The restoration addressed cracks in the Victorian stonework caused by corroded ironwork and repaired the internal wooden framework, which had deteriorated due to water damage. The church’s clock and weather vane were also refurbished and reinstalled. However, in the same year, an infestation of deathwatch beetles was discovered, threatening the timber roof. As a result, the church was placed on the Heritage at Risk Register by Historic England.

== Architecture ==
=== Exterior ===
The tower is 19th century Gothic, of grey-black ashlar. The prominent spire has an octagonal bell-stage. The remainder of the church is of yellow-black gritstone. The nave and chancel are Elizabethan, from 1582 to 1584. Of the nave, Simon Jenkins, in England's Thousand Best Churches, writes: "The nave arches seem undecided between Gothic and classical. They have tentative columns of a Tuscan order, while the arches above are Gothic, a most strange 'transitional' form."

=== Interior ===
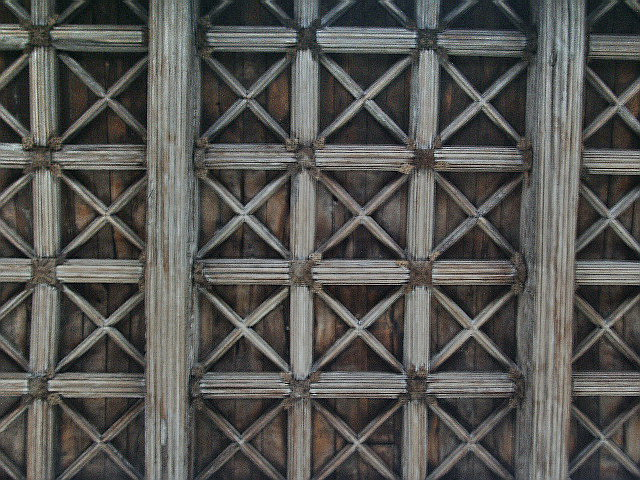
The Tudor ceiling

Jenkins describes the church as having "... the finest roof in Lancashire, worthy of Somerset's best. This is a Tudor work of panels and cross-braces covering nave, aisles and, most elaborate, the chancel. The vicar has studied the bosses and claims that no two are the same". The pew ends in the Standish family chapel display the family crest of an owl with a rat.

== Monuments ==
The churchyard, which is divided into old and new sections, contains the war graves of four service personnel of the First World War, and nine of the Second World War; most of the graves are in the new section.

== See also ==
- Grade I listed churches in Greater Manchester
- Listed buildings in Standish, Greater Manchester
- List of ecclesiastical works by Austin and Paley (1895–1914)
- List of ecclesiastical works by Austin and Paley (1916–44)
