= T. Alan Hatton =

Researcher

- Born: Durban, South Africa
- Education: University of Natal; University of Wisconsin–Madison
- Known for: Purification technology
- Scientific career
- Workplaces: Massachusetts Institute of Technology

T. Alan Hatton is the Ralph Landau Professor and the Director of the David H. Koch School of Chemical Engineering Practice at Massachusetts Institute of Technology. As part of the MIT Energy Initiative, he co-directs the Center for Carbon Capture, Utilization and Storage. His work focuses on the development of purification technologies of various kinds for use with air, water, and other substances.

== Early life and education ==
Trevor Alan Hatton was born in Durban, South Africa. He earned his B.Sc. Eng. (1972) and M.Sc. Eng. (1976) degrees at the University of Natal, Durban. He then worked for the Council for Scientific and Industrial Research in Pretoria for three years. Hatton earned his Ph.D. from the University of Wisconsin–Madison, in 1981, working with Edwin N. Lightfoot.

== Career ==
Hatton joined the Massachusetts Institute of Technology (MIT) in 1982. For several years he and his wife Marianne were faculty residents, living at MacGregor House until 1986.

In 1995, Ralph Landau established a new chair at MIT: the Ralph Landau Professorship of Chemical Engineering Practice, to be held by the Director of the David H. Koch School of Chemical Engineering Practice. T. Alan Hatton became the first Ralph Landau Professor of the Practice School in 1996. At the Practice School, students complete placements at industrial projects with international host companies, as well as taking on-campus academic courses. Hatton has been the program director of the Practice School for over 28 years.

Beginning in 2015, the MIT Energy Initiative has established eight low-carbon energy centers focusing on technical advancements in areas critical for climate change. Hatton co-directs the Center for Carbon Capture, Utilization and Storage.

Hatton holds an honorary professorship at the University of Melbourne and is an adjunct professor at Curtin University in Perth, Australia.

He has served as a co-editor of Colloids and Surfaces, and is on the international advisory board of the Chinese Journal of Chemical Engineering. In 1990, he chaired the Gordon Research Conference on Separation and Purification. In 1999, he co-chaired the 73rd Colloid and Surface Science Symposium, held at MIT, with Paul E. Labinis.

== Research ==
Hatton has published widely on colloidal phenomena and their applications in chemical processing. His research interests include responsive surfactants and gels obtained by colloidal self-assembly, stimuli-responsive materials, chemically reactive fibers and fabrics, metal-organic frameworks for separations and catalysis, and synthesis and functionalization of magnetic nanoparticles and clusters.

Much of his work focuses on the development of purification technologies of various kinds. In the 1980s, he studied the effects of metal ions, clays, and minerals on sorption capacities. In the 1990s, Hatton worked to develop solvents for chemical synthesis, separation and cleaning that were less volatile and less water-soluble. This decreased the potential for undesirable air emissions or aqueous discharge.

Hatton has done considerable work on the use of magnetically sensitive nanoparticles for separation of liquids. Nanoparticles can be designed with a distinctive protein signature that will attract and attach a desired target protein. The nanoparticles can then be added to a suspension, where they will attach the target molecules. By subjecting the liquid to a magnetic field, the nanoparticles with their attached targets can be removed from the suspension. Finally the nanoparticles and proteins can be separated, recovering the nanoparticles for reuse. Hatton has used this type of technique for the separation of oil from water. He hopes it may be used eventually for the cleaning up of oil spills.

As of 2012, Hatton worked on electrochemically mediated methods of carbon capture and conversion which could be used to reduce emissions from power plants and industry and decrease greenhouse gases. The researchers are studying magnesium oxide-based materials, coating particles of MgO with alkali metal nitrates. The resulting materials can capture more than ten times as much carbon dioxide (CO_{2}) as other materials being investigated, at lower temperatures.

As of 2015, T. Alan Hatton and Aly Eltayeb received funding to develop a commercial prototype for carbon capture and storage from the smokestacks of industrial and power plants that burn fossil fuels. First, flue gases are passed through a liquid containing amines, which attract carbon dioxide. Then, building on the work of Michael Stern, the prototype passes the resulting solution through an electrochemical cell containing two electrically charged copper plates. This causes the amines to release the carbon dioxide, which can be sequestered or reused. The approach would remove carbon from the atmosphere, while using less electricity than current amine scrubber technology.

As of 2016, Yogesh Surendranath and T. Alan Hatton received a Seed Fund Grant from the MIT Energy Initiative to investigate the possible cycling of carbon dioxide (CO_{2}) emissions into chemical fuel.

With Xiao Su and others, Hatton has developed new methods of removing unwanted substances such as chemical waste, pesticides, and pharmaceuticals from water supplies. Both positive and negative electrodes or plates can be coated with Faradaic materials, which are chemically "functionalized" to react with specific molecules. As water flows between the plates, electricity is applied causing the active groups on the plates to combine with desired molecules. This process can work even with very small trace concentrations of target particles, present at parts-per-million. For their work on water purification, researchers won the 2016 Water Innovation Prize. By better understanding fundamental mechanisms involved in electrosorption, they are attempting to design more effective novel electrode materials.

== Awards ==
- 2026, NAE Bernard M. Gordon Prize for Innovation in Engineering and Technology Education
- 2016, Water Innovation Prize, MIT
- 1985, Presidential Young Investigator Award, NSF
- 1983, Everett Moore Baker Award for Excellence in Undergraduate Teaching, MIT
