= Hatten är din =

2000 internet meme

Hatten är din (Swedish for "The hat is yours") is an Internet meme from 2000. It is a Flash animation featuring the music of Lebanese musician Azar Habib; the name of the song playing is "Miin Ma Kenti". The animation prominently features a hat, Swedish text, and an assortment of bizarre imagery.

== Origin ==
In 1981, Habib recorded "Miin Ma Kenti" (Whoever you are), also known as "Habbaytek"/"Habbeetik" (I Loved You, or I Fell In Love With You) in Arabic for his Ya Malaki album; the tape eventually made its way to Sweden. Nineteen years later, Swedes Patrik Nyberg, Johan Gröndahl and Pet Bagge noticed that the lyrics sounded like Swedish. With this in mind, they published an mp3 file and a text file with the "misheard" lyrics on their website. Shortly after this, another Swede, Martin Holmström, decided to make a flash video of the song, which he published on his site. It has been seen by millions of people around the world.

== Details ==
The Swedish "subtitles" are not a translation of the Arabic, but rather a homophonic translation of the lyrics into Swedish, resulting in outlandish non sequiturs such as Limma skinkbit, cooligt (glue piece of ham, cool-ish) and Man kan knarka och hamna i TV (You can do drugs and end up on TV). From the contents of these lyrics the deadpan site presented a Swedish drinking game involving the passing around of hats, which was sometimes taken at face value by viewers.

The accompanying images of the animation are ostensibly Middle Eastern men in hats; one of those hats floating among a party of people, who appear to be dressed in traditional Turkish or Middle Eastern clothing; and visualizations of the Swedish lyrics such as "cool guy with soda in hand" and "borrow the LP 'Hatten är din' ".

== Reception ==
The song became famous in Scandinavia and, according to Nyberg, was often played at drinking parties. Copies were made and sold without the creators' permission. The Metro newspaper of Stockholm even sent a journalist to get an interview with Azar Habib. Habib was apparently surprised by this mutilation of his song and the craze that followed, but liked the idea.

In the English-speaking world, the animation was also known as "Hatt-baby".

== See also ==
- Animutation
- Mondegreen
- Soramimi
