= John Hatton (cricketer) =

English cricketer

Personal information
- Full name: John Hatton
- Born: 25 February 1858; West Dean, Gloucestershire, England
- Died: 25 April 1915 (aged 57); Gloucester, Gloucestershire, England
- Batting: Unknown
- Bowling: Wicket-keeper

Domestic team information
- Years: Team
- 1884: Gloucestershire

Career statistics
Competition	First-class
Matches	3
Runs scored	28
Batting average	5.60
100s/50s	–/–
Top score	11*
Balls bowled	–
Wickets	–
Bowling average	–
5 wickets in innings	–
10 wickets in match	–
Best bowling	–
Catches/stumpings	1/–
- Source: Cricinfo, 28 January 2012

John Hatton (25 February 1858 – 15 April 1915) was an English cricketer. Hatton's batting style is unknown, though it is known he fielded as a wicket-keeper. He was born at West Dean, Gloucestershire.

Hatton made his first-class debut for Gloucestershire against Yorkshire in 1884. He made two further first-class appearances for Gloucestershire in that season, against Sussex and Yorkshire. In his three first-class appearances for Gloucestershire, he scored a total of 28 runs, which came at an average of 5.60, with a high score of 11 not out.

He died at Gloucester, Gloucestershire on 15 April 1915.
