= Standish, Greater Manchester =

Village in Wigan, England

Coordinates: 53°35′10″N 2°39′50″W

Standish
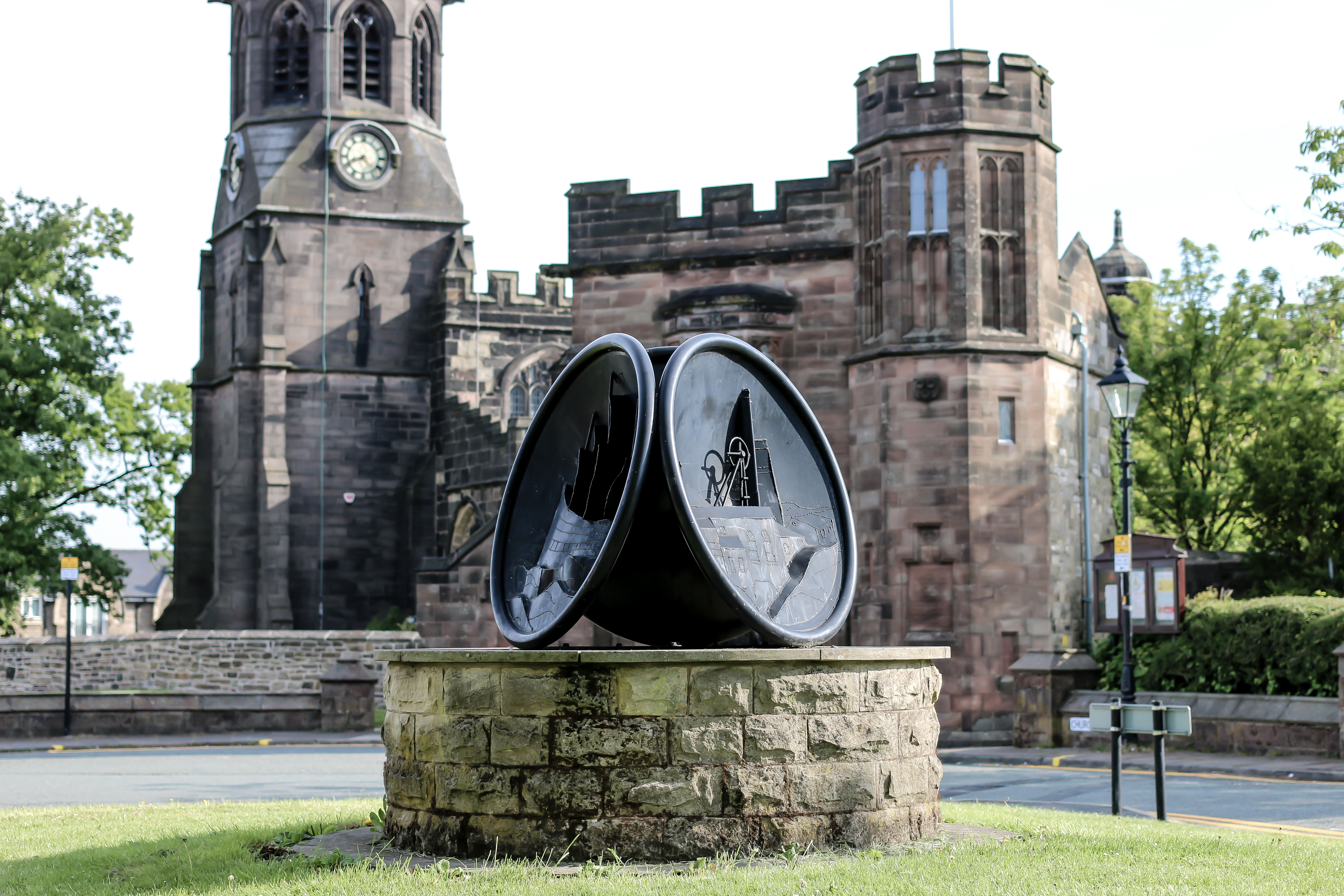
- St Wilfrid's Church and the Standing Plates, commemorating coal mining, the Mayflower, and the Owl and the Rat (not visible)

- Location within Greater Manchester
- Area: 5.1 sq mi (13 km^{2})
- Population: 13,278
  - Density: 2,604/sq mi (1,005/km^{2})
- OS grid reference: SD560102
  - London: 179 mi (288 km)
- Metropolitan borough: Wigan
- Metropolitan county: Greater Manchester
- Region: North West
- Country: England
- Sovereign state: United Kingdom
- Post town: WIGAN
- Postcode district: WN1 WN6
- Dialling code: 01257
- Police: Greater Manchester
- Fire: Greater Manchester
- Ambulance: North West
- UK Parliament: Wigan

Standish is a village in the Metropolitan Borough of Wigan, Greater Manchester, England. Within the boundaries of the historic county of Lancashire, it is on the A49 road between Chorley and Wigan, near Junction 27 of the M6 motorway. The population of the town was 13,278 in the 2011 census.

Formed around a crossroads, the town has grown as urban expansion between Manchester and Liverpool extends outwards. St Wilfrid's Church is a Grade I listed parish church.

== History ==
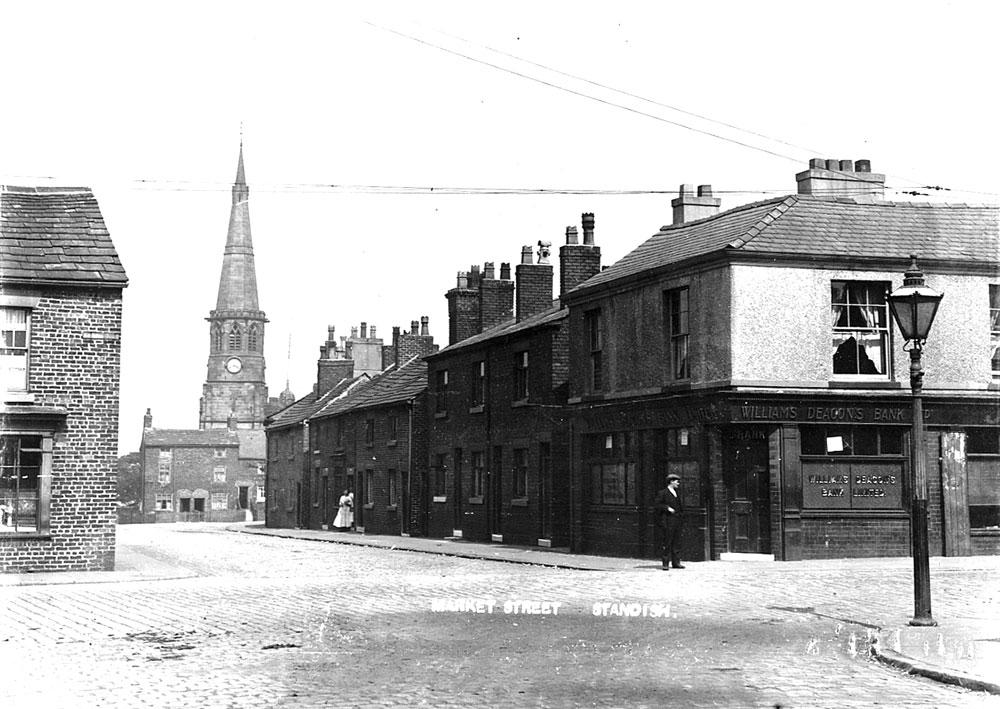
The crossroads in Standish c. 1920s, with the church and "Spite Row" in the background

The name Standish is derived from the Old English stan, meaning stone, and edisc, a park or enclosure. It has been variously recorded as Stanedis in 1206, Stanediss in 1219, Standissh, Stanedich and Stanedissh in 1292 and Standisch in 1330. The adjoining village of Langtree was recorded as Langetre in 1206 and Longetre in 1330.

Two Roman hoards have been found in Standish. A copper vessel containing 200 silver coins was found near the highway in about 1675, and the Boar's Head Hoard was found in the village in 1926, consisting of 137 denarii. A Roman road passed through the township.

Standish and Langtree were part of the Penwortham barony in the 12th century, and between 1150 and 1164, Richard Bussel, Lord of Penwortham gave them to his brother-in-law Richard Spileman. In 1212, Thurstan Banastre held them, and later they were held by William de Ferrers, Earl of Derby, and then by 'the lords of Leylandshire'. The tenants adopted the local surnames, Standish and Langtree.

From the 13th century, the Standish family were Lords of the Manor of Standish and owned the Standish Hall and estates. The male line ended in 1755 with the death of Ralph Standish, and the estate was passed down through female lines until it was broken up in 1920. Standish Hall, whose oldest part dated from 1574, was demolished in stages during the 20th century. However, several of its wood-panelled interiors survive, most of which were transported to the US.

The Standish family were the main coal owners in the area, with their estate being mined since the 14th century. Coal mining in the area increased during the Industrial Revolution. During 1865–66, the Standish collieries were merged into the Wigan Coal and Iron Company. By 1896, Wigan Coal & Iron owned the Broomfield, Giant's Hall, Gidlow, John, Langtree, Robin Hill, Swire and Taylor Pits. The largest of these was the Langtree Pit with over 540 employees.

In 1900 the two 20 ft shafts of Wigan Coal's Victoria Colliery were sunk. This would continue to operate until its closure by the National Coal Board in 1958. It is now a housing estate, although its reclamation site is used as open space. Mining in the village reached its peak around 1914, with 11 active mines in Standish and Shevington. The last operating mine in Standish was Robin Hill drift mine, which opened in 1953 and closed in 1963.

Traditionally, most of the housing in Standish was terraced; however, in the 1930s, the village expanded mainly with semi-detached houses and bungalows. The M6 motorway was constructed through the western side of Standish during the 1960s. Its arrival contributed to the area gradually shifting away from its historic roots in farming and mining, to a "commuter village". Later development, between the 1960s and 1990s, focused on larger estates of detached homes, and substantial residential development has continued into the 21st century. Standish Leisure Centre, funded through contributions from housing developers, officially opened in February 2020.

== Geography ==
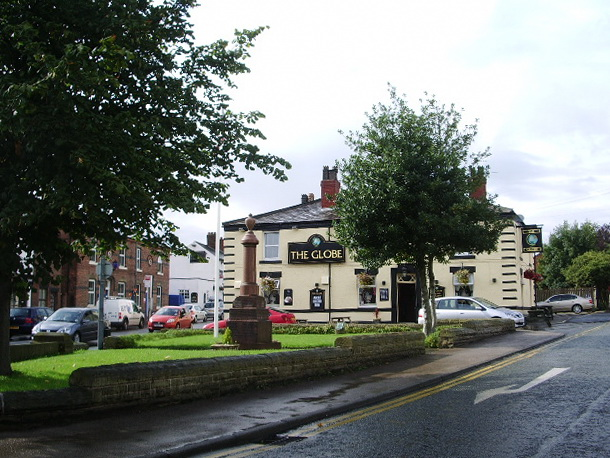
Standish Pillar War Memorial and The Globe pub

Standish is 3 1/4 miles (5.2 km) north-by-northwest of Wigan, 19 miles north-west of Manchester, and 18 miles north-east of Liverpool. The A49 trunk road passes through the centre of the town, on its way from Wigan to Chorley. Standish is served by Junction 27 of the M6 motorway, which is to the west of the town. The West Coast Main Line is on the eastern side of the town, around a mile from the centre. The River Douglas and Bradley Brook form the boundary on the eastern side of Standish. Mill Brook, which flows into the Douglas, forms the western boundary. Standish is situated on a ridge of high land which rises to 370 feet and runs north to south across the township, near the river the land is between 120 and 160 feet.

In the village, the area of Standish lies to the south (covering 1,696 acres), and the area of Langtree to the north (covering 1,568 acres) – historically some considered them to be separate townships. Standish-with-Langtree is a total of 3,264 acres (5.1 sq mi). Locally, the village of Shevington is 1 1/2 miles (2.4 km) to the west, with the area of Shevington Moor to the north-west (near Langtree), and Standish Lower Ground, a distinct and separate community, is 1 3/4 miles (2.8 km) to the south-west.

Standish has soil and subsoil of clay and the underlying rocks are the coal measures of the Lancashire Coalfield.

== Demography ==
Standish has a population of 13,278 people, based on the 2011 census, this represents 4.2% of the population of Wigan Borough. There is a higher than average number of residents over the age of 65, representing 19.9% of the population. It is an affluent community with seven out of the nine areas appearing within the top 30% most affluent in England. 80% of residents own their homes or have a mortgage; only 10% of households live in social housing.

== Governance ==
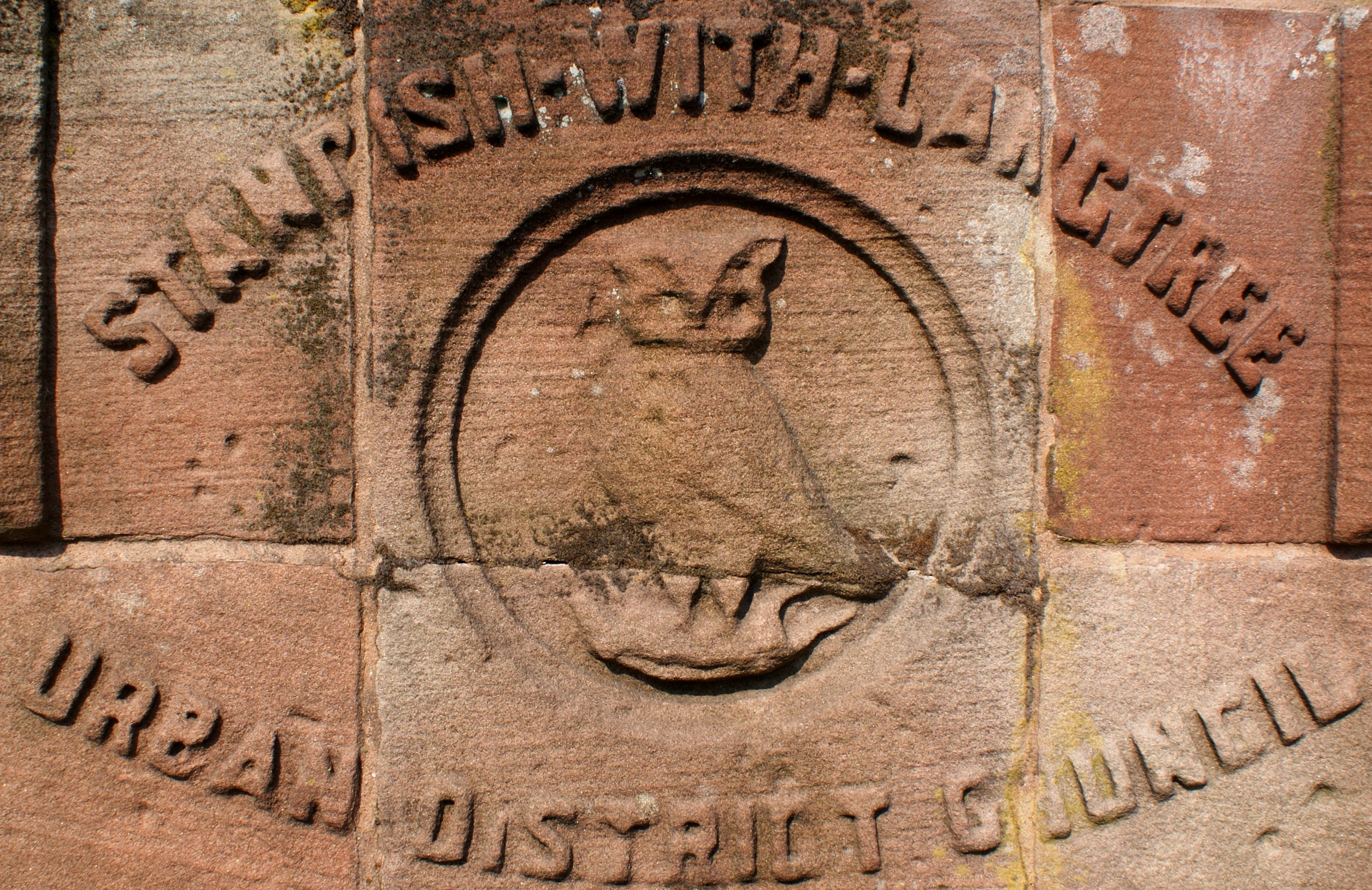
For much of its history, Standish formed a local government district under the name Standish-with-Langtree.

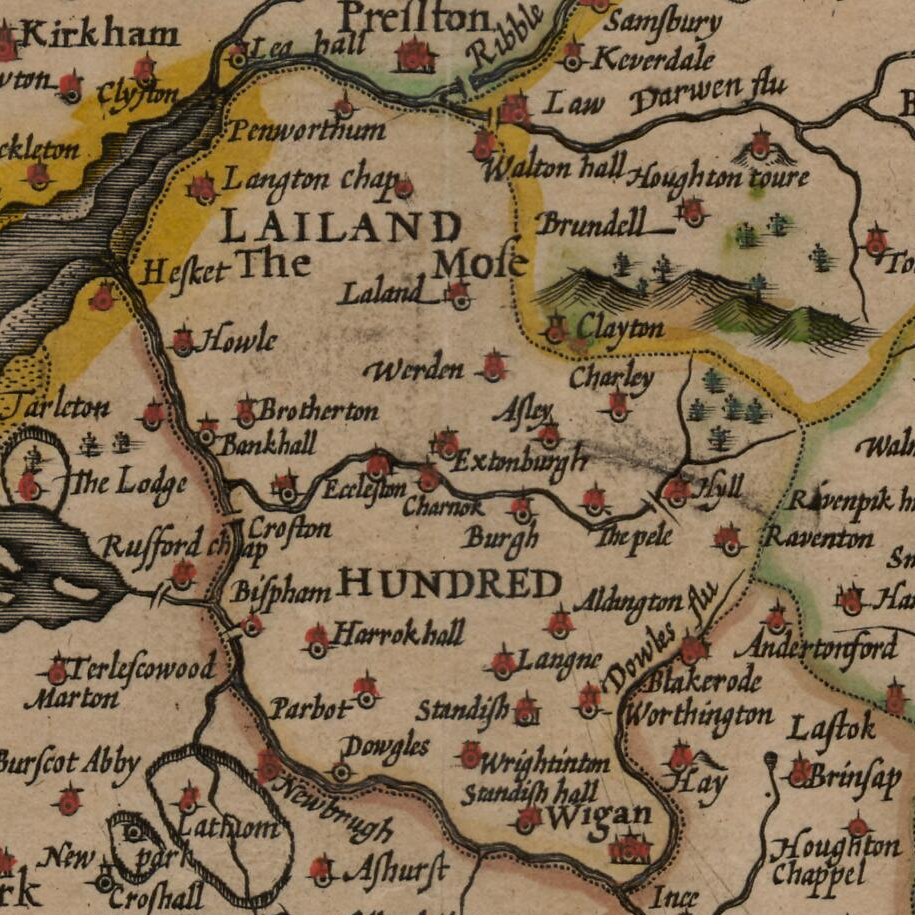
Standish and Langtree (Langne) were part of the Leyland Hundred; John Speed's 1610 map of Lancashire.

Lying within the historic county boundaries of Lancashire since the early 12th century, Standish emerged as a township in the Middle Ages but by the mid-19th century was united with neighbouring Langtree, as Standish-with-Langtree. The township was in the larger Standish ecclesiastical parish.

Following the Poor Law Amendment Act 1834, Standish-with-Langtree formed part of the Wigan Poor Law Union, an inter-parish unit established to administer the Poor Law which made use of premises on Frog Lane, Wigan and Hindley. Standish-with-Langtree became a local board of health established in 1872; Standish-with-Langtree Local Board of Health was a regulatory body responsible for standards of hygiene and sanitation in the township. Following the Local Government Act 1894, the area of the local board became an urban district within the administrative county of Lancashire.

The Urban District Council had a offices in the village, built in 1893, known as the Town Hall (now occupied by the Medical Practice). It housed a council chamber, a library, courtrooms, and a mortuary. It was demolished in 1989. Before the Urban District Council offices were built, public meetings and court proceedings were held at the Court House, located behind the former Eagle and Child pub.

Under the Local Government Act 1972, the Standish-with-Langtree Urban District was abolished, and Standish has, since 1 April 1974, formed an unparished area of the Metropolitan Borough of Wigan, a local government district of the metropolitan county of Greater Manchester. For electoral purposes, the village is within the Standish With Langtree Ward.

The residents' group Standish Voice, was formed in July 2014. In May 2015, it was designated as the Neighbourhood Forum for Standish, with the aim of creating a Neighbourhood Plan for the village. Following a Neighbourhood Referendum on 18 July 2019, Standish Neighbourhood Plan 2015–2030 was adopted into the development plan for Wigan borough (with 94.5% voting in favour). The legally-binding document covers the use and development of land; and guides future development, regeneration and conservation of the area.

The former Urban District Council and Standish Voice use the Owl and the Rat as their emblem. It is an ancient heraldic symbol of the Standish family. Up until the 18th century, the rat was upright rather than upturned; this could have been changed as "a plee for forgivness" by Ralph Standish after his pardon for his part in the Jacobite rising of 1715.

== Landmarks ==
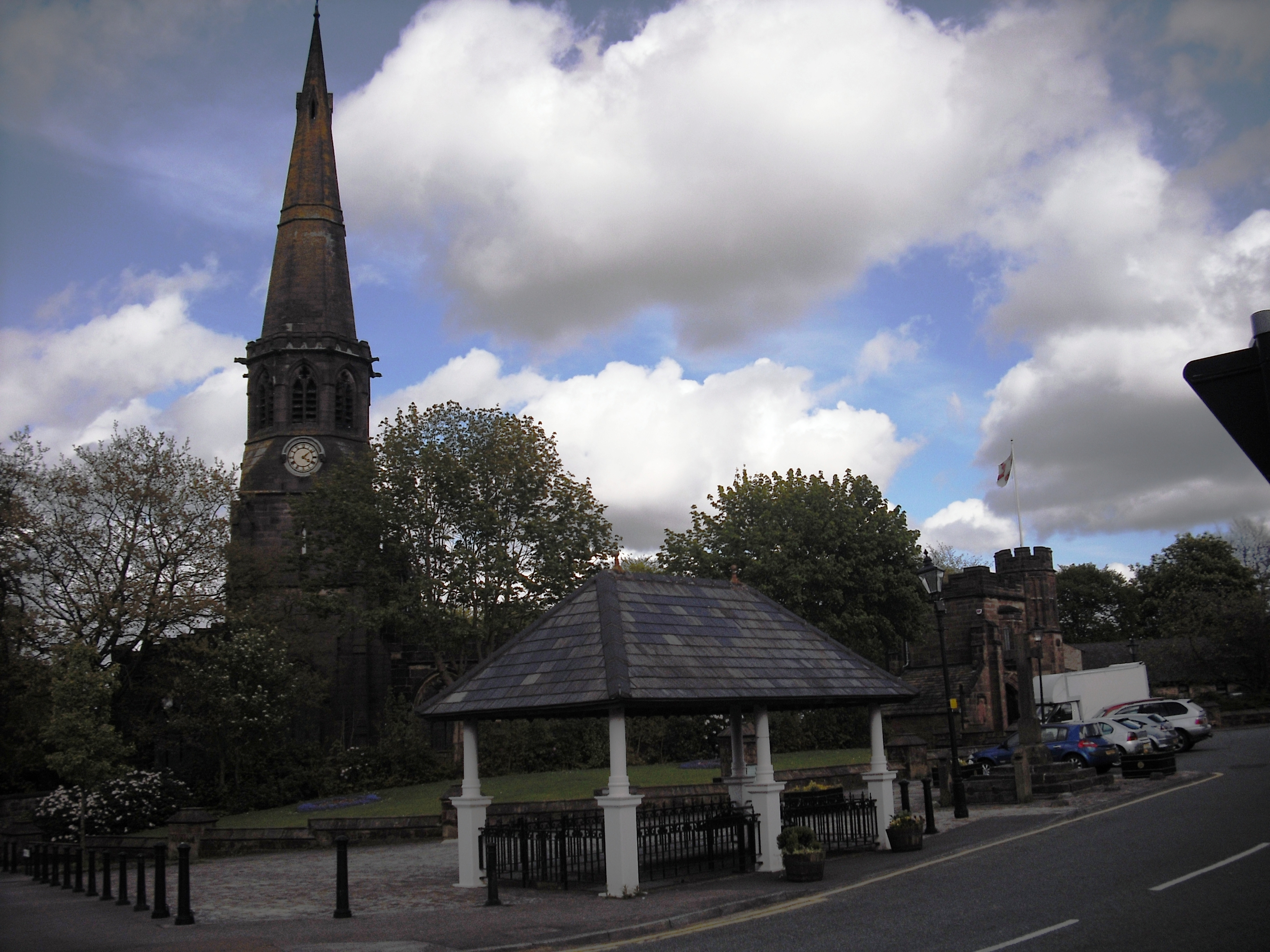
The Parish Church of St Wilfrid is the only Grade I listed building in the Metropolitan Borough of Wigan

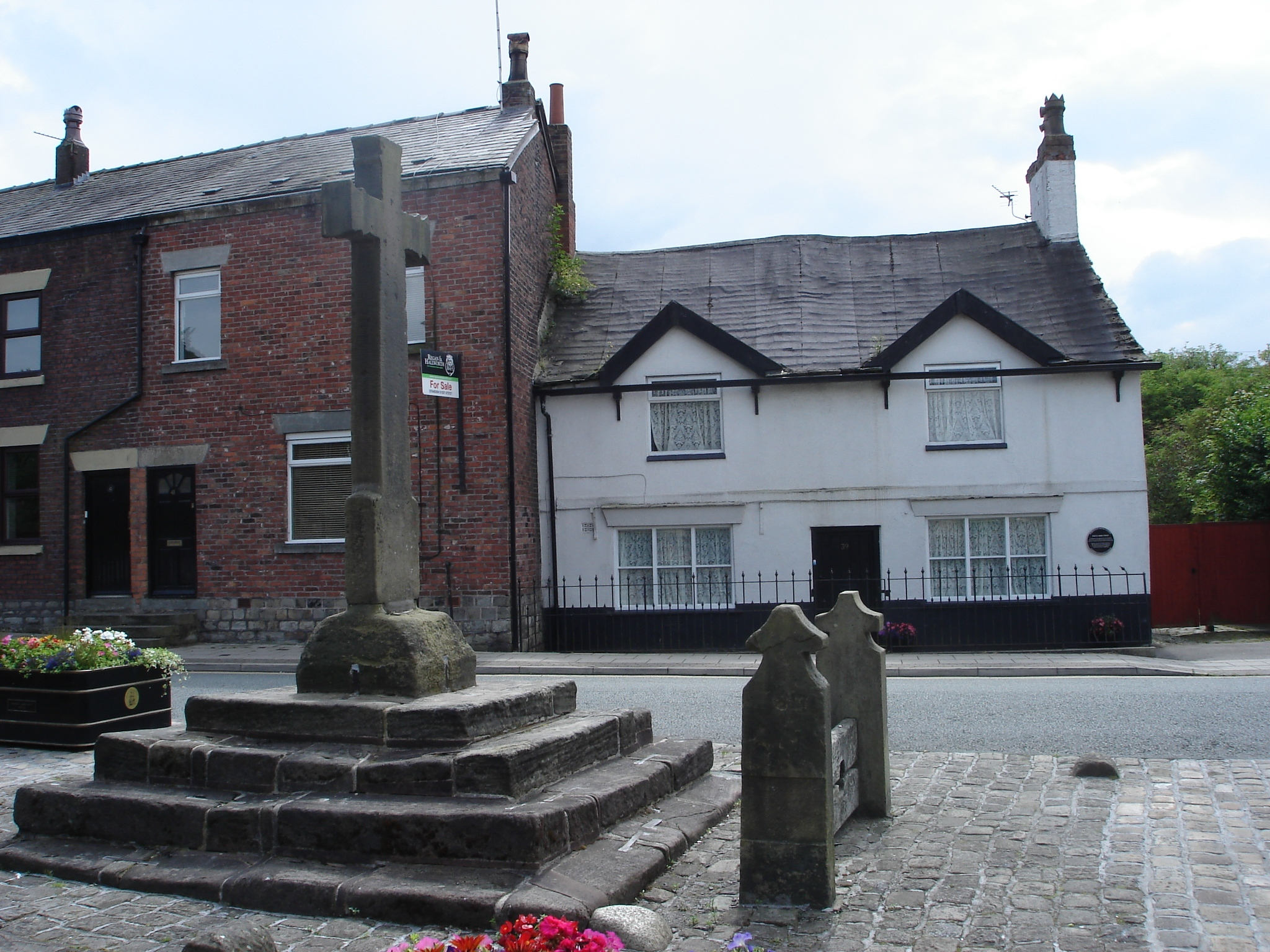
Cross, stocks and the former Eagle and Child pub, Market Place

There are 22 Listed buildings in Standish, including one with a Grade I listing and two at Grade II*.

St Wilfrid's Parish Church is the only building with a Grade I listing in the Metropolitan Borough of Wigan. In the Market Place in front of the church is a late medieval cross, stone stocks and a 14th-century well.

The two Grade II* buildings in the village are Bradley Hall and Giant's Hall Farmhouse. Standish has the 22-acre Ashfield Park, which contains a mixture of woodland, open green space, and recreational facilities. Part of Ashfield is designated locally as a historic park and garden.

The village has three Grade II listed war memorials; the Peace Gate at St Wilfrid's Church, a memorial cross at the St Marie's Catholic Church, and Standish Pillar War Memorial in the Victoria Jubilee Memorial Garden (near the Globe pub). The Pillar War Memorial, unveiled in 1920, was dedicated to the men of Standish lost in the Great War. It was originally erected without names inscribed, but these were added in 1923; after WWII an additional block of granite was inserted below the Great War names and inscribed with the names of those lost in WW2.

In the south of the village is Gidlow Cemetery, which was founded in 1948.

== Transport ==
Standish is well-connected by bus services. The Bee Network 632 runs every 20 minutes along the Wigan to Chorley route. Additional services include the hourly Wigan to Preston 110 bus operated by Holmeswood Coaches, the hourly 311 bus from Chorley to Ormskirk via Skelmersdale operated by Preston Bus, and the hourly 640 and 641 Standish Circular busses both operated by Bee Network. The hourly 631 service to Wigan was launched in 2025, the second new Bee Network service.

The village was formerly served by two railway stations: Standish railway station to the north and Boar's Head railway station to the south. Both were on the West Coast Main Line and closed in 1949. Standish was also historically served by trams, run by Wigan Corporation Tramways, which ceased operation in 1931.

Standish has a number of footpaths and cycling routes, such as the Standish Mineral Line. Locally known as 'The Line', it underwent a significant upgrade in 2018 as part of the Standish Cycleway project. The Line follows the route of a disused railway, running from the village centre to the former Robin Hill Colliery near Shevington Moor.

== Education ==
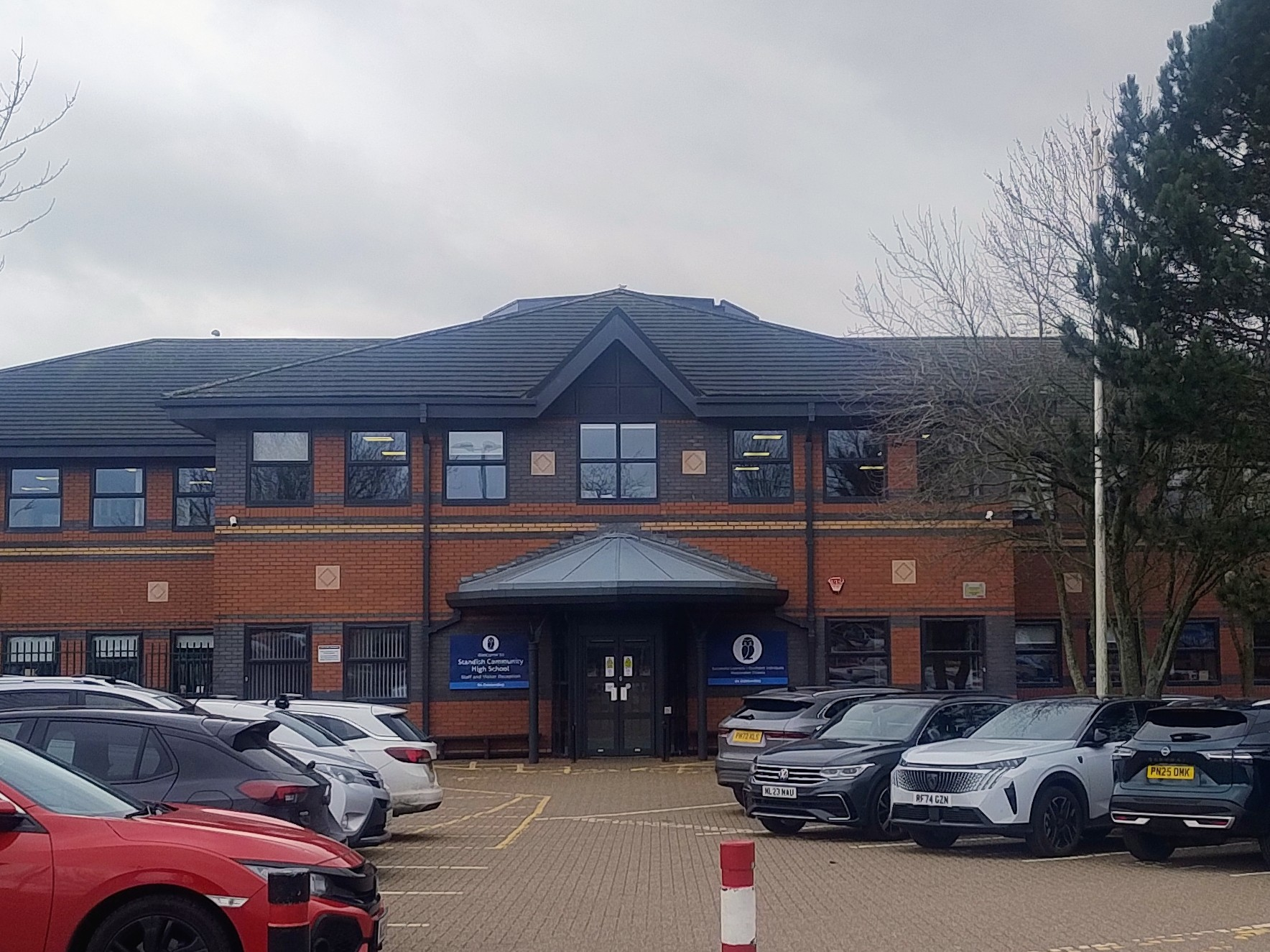
Standish High School

Standish has one secondary school, Standish Community High School, which has approximately 1,250 students aged 11–16. Standish also has three primary schools: St. Wilfrid's Church of England Primary Academy, St Marie's Catholic Primary School, and Woodfold Primary School.

Standish previously had a grammar school, founded in 1604. It later became a junior school for boys up to age 11, which closed in 1964 and was eventually demolished. Standish has a library in the village centre, which was opened in 1965.

== Notable people ==
- Henry Standish (c. 1475–1535), Franciscan priest, who became Bishop of St. Asaph.
- William Leigh (1550–1639), a preacher and author, rector of St Wilfrid's Church, Standish.
- Ralph Brideoake (c. 1612–1678), clergyman, who became Bishop of Chichester.
- Henry Finch (1633–1704), Presbyterian minister ejected from Church of England; born in Standish.
- Edward Dicconson (1670–1752), Roman Catholic bishop, the Vicar Apostolic of the Northern District of England, 1740 to 1752.
- Thomas Worthington (1671−1754), a Dominican friar and writer with local roots.
- Charles Walmesley (1722–1797), Roman Catholic Bishop, the Apostolic Vicariate of the Western District (England and Wales).
- Leonard Calderbank (1809–1864), a Roman Catholic priest and canon of Clifton.
- Nathaniel Eckersley (1815–1892), mill owner, Mayor of Wigan and MP for Wigan; born at Standish Hall
- Thomas Kershaw (1819–1898), pioneer of marbleising, the creation of imitation marble finishes.
- Thorley Smith, (1873–1940), the first candidate to be a Women's suffrage M.P., stood in 1906
- William Billington (1875–1952), an English executioner, on the Home Office list from 1902 to 1905
- Jack Barton (dates unknown), rugby player, played 213 games for Wigan Warriors between 1901 and 1910
- Sadie Speight, Lady Martin (1906–1992), an architect, designer and writer; a leading figure in Modern architecture
- Brian Finch (1936–2007), scriptwriter, he wrote 150 scripts for Coronation Street between 1970 and 1989
- Richard Skelton (born ca 1970), musician, used to live locally
- Ashley Slanina-Davies (born 1989), actress, played Amy Barnes in the soap opera Hollyoaks (2005–2014)

== See also ==
- Listed buildings in Standish, Greater Manchester
- Standish family
