= Frank Hatton =

Frank Hatton may refer to:

- Frank Hatton (American politician) (1846–1894), United States Postmaster-General 1884–1885
- Frank Hatton (British politician) (1921–1978), Labour Party Member of Parliament 1973–1978
- Frank Hatton (explorer) (1861–1883), British mineralogist and explorer
