= Mark Hatton (cricketer) =

Australian cricketer (born 1974)

Personal information
- Full name: Mark Aaron Hatton
- Born: 24 January 1974 (age 52); Waverley, New South Wales, Australia
- Batting: Right-handed
- Bowling: Slow left-arm orthodox

Domestic team information
- Years: Team
- 1998/99: Australian Capital Territory
- 1994/95–1996/97: Tasmania

Career statistics
Competition	FC	LA
Matches	14	7
Runs scored	186	–
Batting average	16.90	–
100s/50s	–/–	–/–
Top score	39*	–
Balls bowled	2,202	274
Wickets	28	11
Bowling average	50.82	18.00
5 wickets in innings	1	–
10 wickets in match	–	–
Best bowling	5/113	4/11
Catches/stumpings	3/–	3/–
- Source: Cricinfo, 2 January 2011

Mark Aaron Hatton (born 24 January 1974) was an Australian cricketer who played for the Tasmania and the Canberra Comets. He was a left-arm orthodox bowler, and the brother of Northern Territory cricketer, Brad Hatton.

== See also ==
- List of Tasmanian representative cricketers
