= Tom Hatton (actor) =

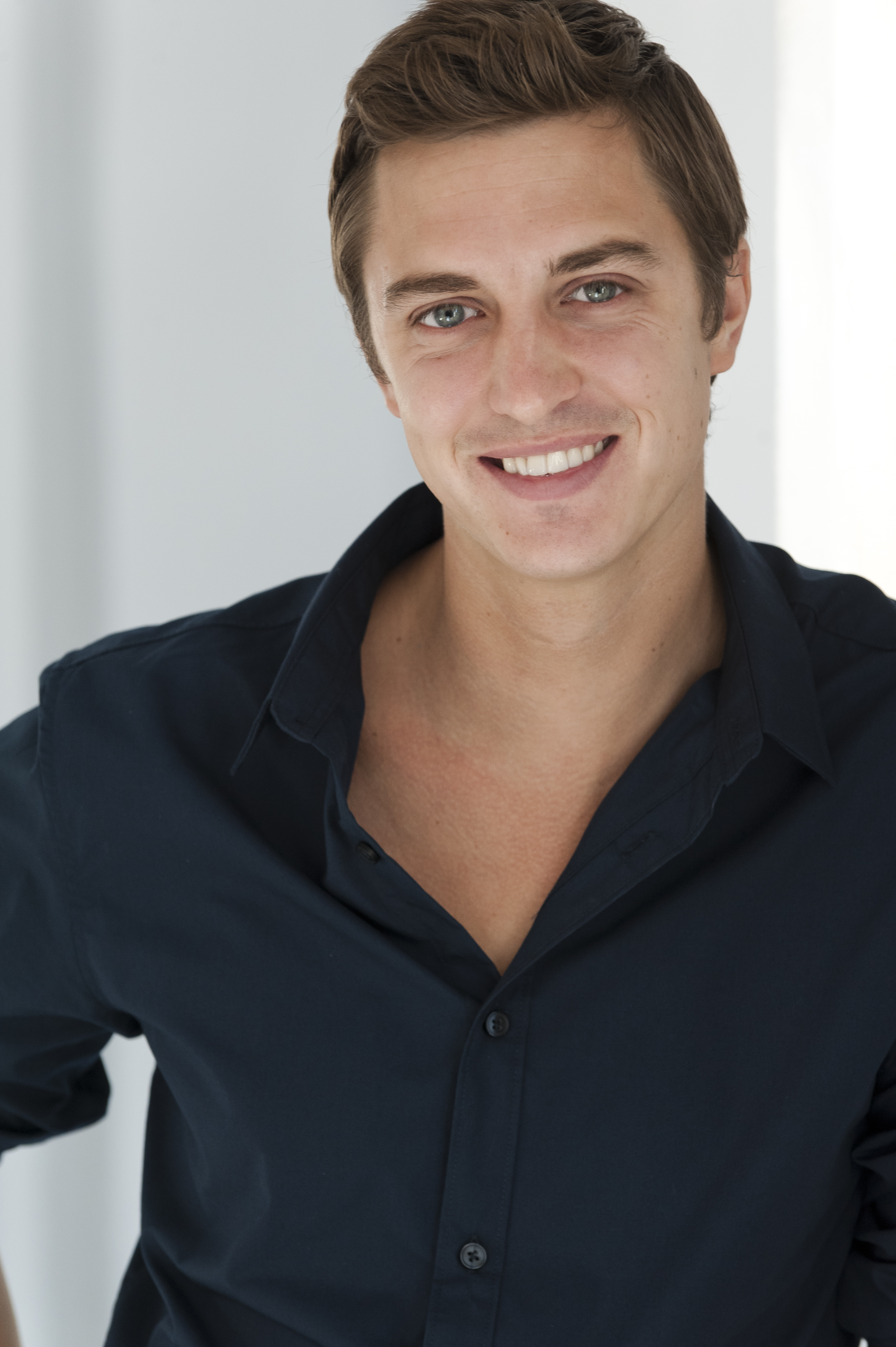
- Tom Hatton, New York City 2014
- Occupations: Host, Actor, Luxury Real Estate Agent
- Known for: Buzz 60, In the Qube

Tom Hatton is an English host, actor and luxury property agent in New York City. He is also the founder of Born Kickers Soccer in New York City

== Education ==
He trained in theater at The Old Vic theatre in London and theater and film at the Lee Strasberg Theatre Institute in New York.

== Career ==
He hosted Buzz 60, an award-winning global online daily news series.

In 2010, Hatton hosted Sony Pictures International television show In the Qube for the Animax channel.

As an entertainment host he has worked with the news show Sky TV and with YRB Magazine, having interviewed Oscar-winning actor Cuba Gooding Jr., hip-hop musician Chuck D and music producer Bryan-Michael Cox. In 2014. he was the Live Announcer for the VH1 You Oughta Know Live Concert, featuring Nicole Richie and Alicia Keys.

His US television roles include appearances on Law & Order: Special Victims Unit. Hatton provided the voice of the British Prince in the video game Grand Theft Auto IV: The Ballad of Gay Tony.

In 2014, he appeared in major commercials for Head & Shoulders, Febreze and Budweiser for the 2014 FIFA World Cup.

== Filmography ==
=== Television ===
- In the Qube (16 episodes, 2010) as Host
- BBC Annual Event 2012 as Host
- A Question of Sport (1 episode, 2005) as Mystery Guest Poker player
- Date Night (1 episode, 2007) as Himself
- Law & Order: Special Victims Unit (1 episode, 2008) as Frat Boy #4
- Life on Mars (1 episode, 2008) as Hippie #2

=== Video games ===
- Grand Theft Auto IV: The Ballad of Gay Tony (2009) as British Prince (voice)
