= Edward Anthony Hatton =

English Dominican apologist

Edward Anthony Hatton (1701 – 23 October 1783 at Stourton Lodge, near Leeds, Yorkshire - according to some authorities, 1781) was an English Dominican apologist.

== Life ==
He was probably the son of Edward Hatton, yeoman, of Great Crosby, Lancashire, who registered his estate as a Catholic non-juror in 1717, and whose family appears in the recusant rolls.

He received his education in the Dominican college at Bornhem, near Antwerp, where he was professed, 25 May 1722, taking the name in religion of Antoninus. Having filled the duties of teacher for several years, he was ordained priest and on 7 July 1730, he left college for the mission work in his own country. He first officiated as chaplain, in turn, to several gentleman in Yorkshire, and in the year 1749 he went to assist Thomas Worthington, O.P, at Middleton Lodge, near Leeds. After the latter's death, which occurred on 25 February 1753 (or 1754), Hatton was entrusted with the care of the mission.

Shortly afterwards he was compelled to remove the mission to Stourton Lodge, where ultimately he succeeded in having a new chapel erected (1776), a few miles distant from the former site. Twice was Hatton appointed to the office of provincial of his order in England: on 21 May 1754-until the year 1758; his second term of office lasted from 7 May 1770, till 1774. In 1776 he began the mission at Hunslet, near Leeds, but did not live long to see its work.

== Works ==
Hatton's writings include:

- Moral and Controversial Lectures upon the Christian Doctrines and Christian Practice (By E.H.), unknown place and date of publication
- Memoirs of the Reformation of England; in two parts. The whole collected chiefly from Acts of Parliament and Protestant historians, published (London, 1826; 2nd ed., 1841) under the pseudonym of Constantius Archaeophilus
- Miscellaneous Sermons upon some of the most important Christian Duties and Gospel Truths, 7 vols., MS.
