= Hatten (name) =

Hatten may refer to the following people

Given name

- Hatten Baratli (born 1991), Tunisian footballer
- Hatten Yoder (1921–2003), American geophysicist and experimental petrologist

Surname

- Hayden Hatten (born 2000), American football player
- Hogan Hatten (born 2000), American football player
- Joe Hatten (1916–1988), American Major League Baseball pitcher
- Kåre Hatten (1908–1983), Norwegian cross-country skier
- Marcus Hatten (born 1980), American basketball player
- Shay Hatten, American screenwriter
- Tom Hatten (1927–2019), American radio, film and television personality
- William H. Hatten (1856–1937), American politician from Wisconsin

== See also ==
- Hatton (surname)
