= Thomas Worthington (Dominican) =

English Dominican friar and writer

Thomas Worthington (1671−1754), was a Dominican friar and writer. He received his education in the college of the English Jesuits at St. Omer. In 1691, he entered the Dominican Order at the convent of Bornhem in Flanders, and in the following year he made his solemn confession as a member of the order. He was ordained priest at Rome in 1695, and went afterwards to the college of St. Thomas Aquinas at Louvain, where he became successively professor of philosophy, theology, and sacred scripture. He graduated B.D. in 1704, was elected prior of Bornhem in 1705, and re-elected in 1708, and was instituted prior provincial of England. For nine years he laboured on the English mission, sometimes in London, but generally in Yorkshire and Lancashire. On his return to Flanders, he was again installed prior of Bornhem, 25 January 1717−18. He was created D.D. in 1718, was elected prior of Bornhem for the fifth time in 1725, and was again instituted provincial on 4 January 1725−6. Subsequently he became chaplain at Middleton Hall, the residence of Ralph Brandling, in the parish of Rothwell, near Leeds. He died there on 25 February 1754 (N.S.)

== Works ==
His works are:

1. ‘Prolegomena ad Sacram Scripturam et Historia Sacra Scholastica Mundi sub lege Naturæ,’ Louvain, 1702, 4to.
2. ‘Historia Sacra Scholastica Mundi, sub lege Mosaicâ, ad Templi ædificationem,’ Louvain, 1704, 4to
3. ‘Historia Sacra Scholastica Mundi, sub lege Mosaicâ à Templi ædificatione ad Nativitatem Christ,’ Louvain, 1705, 4to.
4. ‘An Introduction to the Catholic Faith. By an English Dominican,’ London, 1709, 8vo, pp. 152. The authorship has been erroneously ascribed by Quétif and Echard, in their ‘Scriptores Ordinis Prædicatorum,’ to Father Ambrose Burgis.
5. ‘Annales Fratrum Prædicatorum Provinciæ Anglicanæ Restauratæ,’ 1710. This manuscript, preserved in the archives of the province, comprises a history of the convent of Bornhem from its foundation to the year 1675. It is a Latin abridgment of the ‘Annals’ compiled in Flemish by Hyacinth Coomans, a lay brother, who died in 1701. The Flemish original is lost.
6. ‘History of the Convent of Bornhem, the College of Louvain, and the Monastery of English Sisters at Brussels,’ printed in Bernard de Jonghe's ‘Belgium Dominicanum,’ Brussels, 1719, 4to.
7. ‘Obituary Rolls of Bornhem,’ consisting of notices of the religious of the English Dominican province from the foundation of the convent in 1658 down to 1719.
8. A Latin ‘Memoir of Bishop Williams,’ 1714, 8vo. The whole contents of this manuscript have been published in ‘A Consecrated Life’ by the Rev. Raymund Palmer, O.P., which appeared in ‘Merry England’ for November and December 1887.
9. ‘Brevis Provinciæ Anglicanæ Ratio,’ 4to. Manuscript preserved in the archives of the province; there is also a transcript in the archives of the master-general of the Dominican order at Rome.

== Personal ==
Worthington was the fourth son of Thomas Worthington of Blainsco in the parish of Standish, near Wigan, Lancashire, by his wife Jane, eldest daughter of John Plompton of Plompton, Yorkshire, was born on 23 November 1671
