= Christopher Hatton (died 1619) =

16th-century English politician and patron

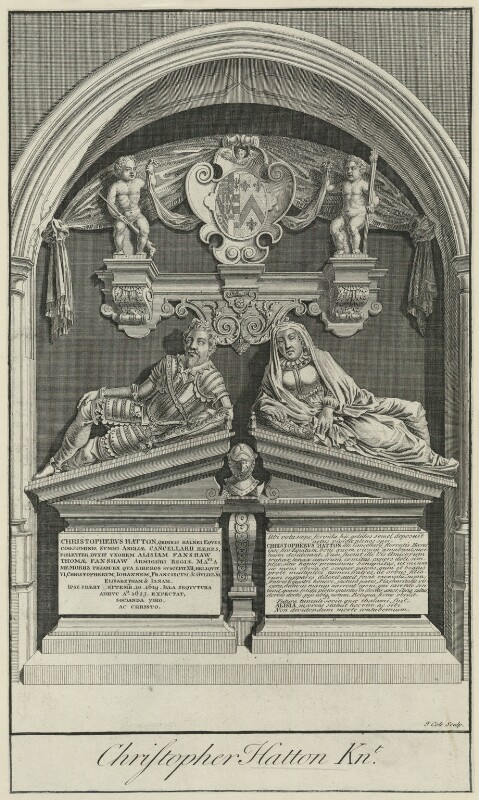
Mid 18th century line engraving by James Cole of a monument to Sir Christopher Hatton and Alice Fanshawe by an unknown sculptor

Sir Christopher Hatton KB (5 March 1581 – 10 September 1619) was an English politician who sat in the House of Commons between 1601 and 1614. He was a noted patron of the arts, supporting composers such as Tobias Hume and Orlando Gibbons.

== Early life ==
Hatton was the eldest son of John Hatton of Longstanton, Cambridgeshire and his wife, Jane Shute, daughter of Robert Shute. His father's first cousin was Sir Christopher Hatton (1540-1591), Queen Elizabeth I's favourite. Sir Christopher Hatton was also his godfather and namesake, and following the death of the elder Sir Christopher's nephew and heir (Sir William "Newport" Hatton), he succeeded to his estates in 1597. He was made a royal ward in 1599. He was educated at Cambridge by 1599.

His older brother was Sir Thomas Hatton, 1st Baronet, ancestors of the Hatton Baronets of Longstanton.

== Career ==
In 1601, Hatton was elected Member of Parliament for Buckingham.

Hatton married Alice Fanshawe, daughter of Thomas Fanshawe of Ware Park, Hertfordshire on 13 March 1602.

Hatton received the favour of James I. He was knighted with the Order of the Bath in 1603. In 1606 he was elected MP for Bedford replacing Humphrey Winch who became a judge. In 1614 Hatton was elected MP for Huntingdon.

In 1616 Hatton's brother-in-law Henry Fanshawe died. The post of remembrancer of the exchequer, which effectively belonged to the Fanshawe family, became vacant. Hatton succeeded his brother-in-law on a temporary basis (the remembrancership was held in trust for Fanshawe's son Thomas), which lasted for the rest of his life. Hatton also became joint steward of the manor of Barking in 1616.

Hatton died intestate aged 38 in 1619 and was buried in Westminster Abbey. He had at least one son and daughter and was succeeded by his son Christopher Hatton, 1st Baron Hatton who became Baron Hatton of Kirby.

== Patronage of the arts ==
Hatton was a patron of the composer Tobias Hume, who dedicated his Poeticall Musicke to him. He was also a patron and friend of Orlando Gibbons who dedicated his First Set of Madrigals and Motets, which in included one of the most famous English madrigals: The Silver Swan. Gibbons stated in his dedication that:

"[The songs] were most of them composed in your owne [sic] house, and doe therefore properly belong unto you, as Lord of the Soile; the language they speake you provided them, I onely furnished them with Tongues to utter the same name".

This quote has been interpreted in suggesting that Hatton was responsible for some of the texts in the set, but there is no decisive evidence to support this. It is also unlikely that Gibbons was a resident of Hatton's household, though it is possible that their friendship led to Hatton setting a room aside for him to compose. Gibbons' children, Christopher and Alice, were likely the namesakes of Hatton and his wife respectively.

Parliament of England
Preceded by Sir Edward Carey; Francis Fortescue	Member of Parliament for Buckingham; 1601; With: Robert Newdigate II	Succeeded by Sir Thomas Denton; Sir Edward Tyrrell
Preceded by Humphrey Winch; Thomas Hawes	Member of Parliament for Bedford; 1606–1611; With: Thomas Hawes	Succeeded by Alexander St John; John Leigh
Preceded by Henry Cromwell alias Williams; Thomas Harley	Member of Parliament for Huntingdon; 1614; With: Miles Fleetwood	Succeeded by Sir Henry St John; Miles Sandys
