= Sir Thomas Hatton, 2nd Baronet =

English politician

Sir Thomas Hatton, 2nd Baronet (1637- 1682) was an English politician who sat in the House of Commons from 1674 to 1679.

Hatton was the son of Sir Thomas Hatton, 1st Baronet of Longstanton, Cambridgeshire and his wife Mary Allington, daughter of Sir Giles Alington, of Horseheath, Cambridgeshire, and his wife Lady Dorothy Cecil, daughter of Thomas Cecil, 1st Earl of Exeter. He succeeded to the baronetcy on the death of his father on 23 September 1658. He was Sheriff of Cambridgeshire and Huntingdonshire from 1662 to 1663.

== Career ==
His loyalty to the Crown does not seem to have been much trusted. He was one of the first to welcome back Charles II, and even before the Restoration made a special visit to the Netherlands to assure the King of his support, but is said to have returned "empty-handed". Samuel Pepys notes the visit in the great Diary.

Little more is heard of Hatton until 1674, when he was elected Member of Parliament for Cambridgeshire in the Cavalier Parliament. He entered Parliament at a time of acute political conflict, when a formal Opposition was emerging, arguably for the first time. Hatton, with his dubious reputation for loyalty to the Crown, achieved little distinction as an MP: he was described as being "equally vile" in the eyes of the Court and the Opposition.

Hatton died in 1682 and was buried at Long Stanton on 19 April 1682.

== Family ==
Hatton married before 1660, Bridget Goring, daughter of Sir William Goring, 1st Baronet of Burton and his wife Bridget Fraunceys, daughter of Sir Edward Fraunceys. They had two sons, Christopher and Thomas, each of whom briefly succeeded to the title. Both died young and the title reverted to their uncle, Sir Christopher Hatton, 5th Baronet.

They also had four daughters: Mary, Elizabeth, Rebecca and Dorothy.

- Mary, the eldest, married John Pocklington of Huntingdonshire, Baron of the Court of Exchequer (Ireland). Their descendants, the Pocklington-Domvile family, settled in Ireland and were substantial landowners in County Dublin.
- Dorothy married Tyrrell Dalton junior (1669-1732) of Fulbourn, Cambridgeshire. He was the son of the elder Tyrrell Dalton (1640-1682), whose memorial tablet can still be seen in St. Vigor's Church, Fulbourn. The Latin inscription on the tablet mourns the premature death of "a learned and religious man, a gentle father, a benign husband, a just man and the best of friends".

Baronetage of England
Preceded by Thomas Hatton	Baronet (of Long Stanton); 1658–1682	Succeeded by Christopher Hatton
