= Robert Hatton =

Robert Hatton may refer to:

- Robert H. Hatton (1826–1862), American lawyer, politician and Confederate officer during the American Civil War
- Robert Hatton (Royalist) (died 1653), English landowner and politician
