= Robert Shute (died 1621) =

English lawyer and politician

Robert Shute (c. 1576 - 10 February 1621) was an English lawyer and politician who sat in the House of Commons between 1620 and 1621.

Shute was the son of Robert Shute, Justice of the Queen's Bench and his wife Thomasine Burgoyne, daughter of Christopher Burgoyne, of Longstanton, Cambridgeshire. He matriculated from Christ's College, Cambridge in 1599 and was admitted at Gray's Inn on 21 November 1600. He was awarded BA at Cambridge in 1602 and MA in 1605.

He was clerk of the Court of Common Pleas in 1616 and became Recorder of London in 1621. In 1620, he was elected Member of Parliament for St Albans. He sat for St Albans until his death in February 1621.

Parliament of England
Preceded by Thomas Perient; Henry Finch	Member of Parliament for St Albans; 1620–1621; With: Sir Thomas Richardson	Succeeded by Sir Thomas Richardson; Henry Meautys
