= Richard Moody =

Richard Moody may refer to:

- Richard Moody (d. 1612), Wiltshire landowner, ancestor of the Moody baronets
- Richard Clement Moody (1813–1887), Royal Engineer, first governor of the Falkland Islands, and founder of British Columbia
- Richard Stanley Hawks Moody (1854–1930), of the Buffs (Royal East Kent Regiment) and the Royal Irish Fusiliers
- Richard Moody, son of Clement Moody (1891–1960) and Fleet Air Arm officer and Quaker peace activist
