= Robert Hare =

Robert Hare may refer to:

- Robert Hare (antiquary) (died 1611), MP for Dunwich
- Robert Hare (chemist) (1781–1858), American chemist who developed the gas blowpipe and the Deflagrator
- Robert D. Hare (born 1934), Canadian criminal psychologist
