= St. Peter's Episcopal Church (Neligh, Nebraska) =

Historic church in Nebraska, United States

- U.S. National Register of Historic Places
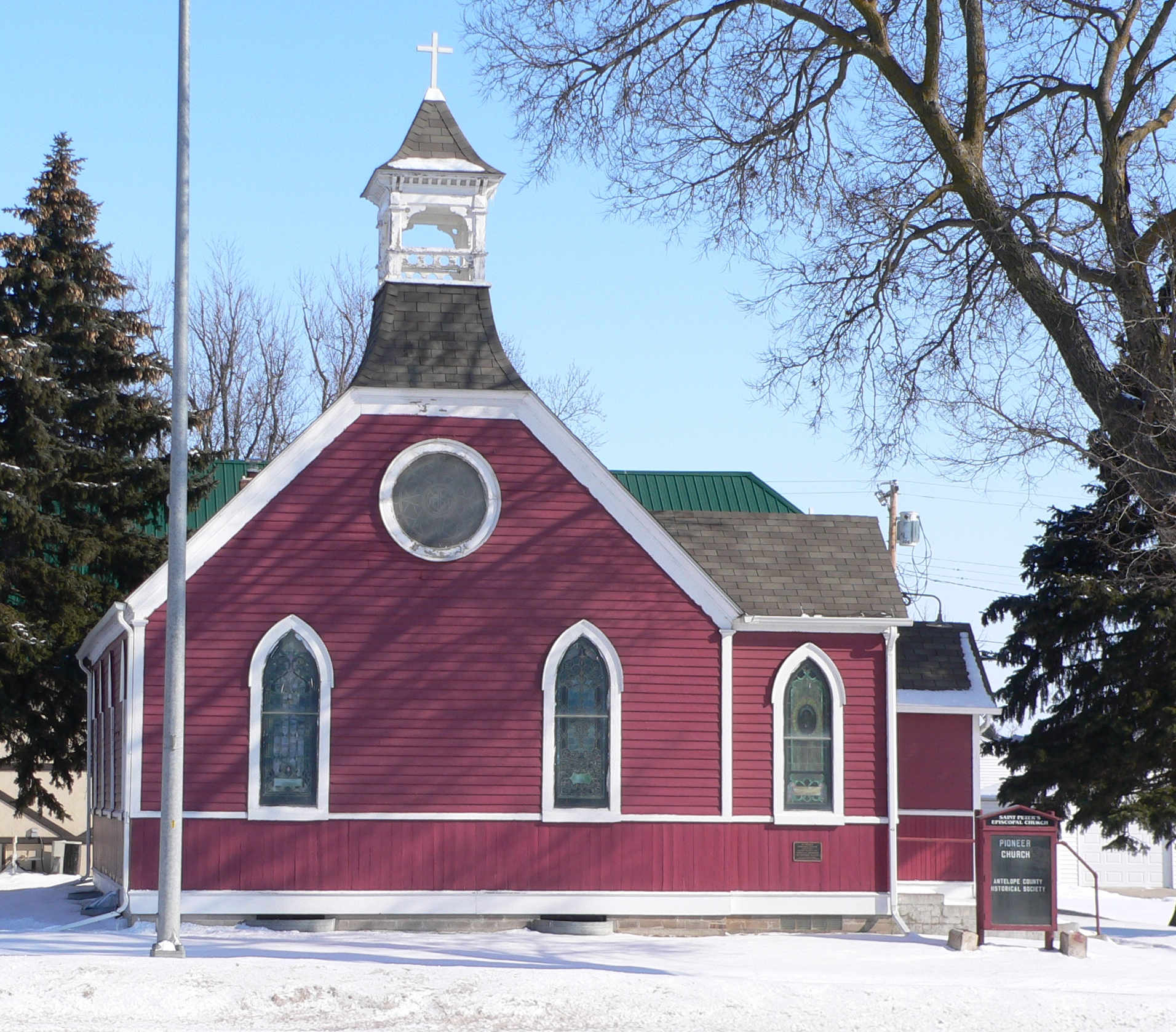

- Location within Nebraska Location within the United States
- Location: 411 L St., Neligh, Nebraska
- Coordinates: 42.1294°N 98.0283°W
- Area: less than one acre
- Built: 1887
- Architectural style: Gothic Revival
- NRHP reference No.: 80002439
- Added to NRHP: December 3, 1980

St. Peter's Episcopal Church, now a museum, is a former church at 411 L Street in Neligh, Nebraska. It was built in 1887 and was added to the National Register in 1980. It house a congregation of the Episcopal Diocese of Nebraska.

== History ==
An Episcopalian congregation was organized in Neligh in 1881. Land was purchased for a church in 1887 on the corner of what was then Cottonwood and Main Streets. The building was completed in late 1887 and consecrated in March 1888. The church was added to the National Register of Historic Places in December 1980.

The building is now the Pioneer Church, part of the Antelope County Museum complex.

== Architecture ==
The church is a one-story frame structure with vertical tongue and groove siding below the window sills and horizontal clapboard siding above. The roof sections are gabled, all windows have pointed arches.

The church design was influenced by the Church of St. James the Less in Philadelphia (1846). The St. James church was the first in the U.S. to be built from designs and under the direct supervision of London, England's Cambridge Camden Society. St. Peters makes allowances for its role as a small town church by using frame construction rather than the buttressed stone construction of its archetype. Other differences are a bell fixture rather than frontal tower and spire, and clipped gables on the end sections of the nave and chancel. St. Peters is a well-preserved 19th century American Gothic Revival building.
