= Moody baronets =

Extinct baronetcy in the Baronetage of England

The Moody baronetcy, of Garsdon in the County of Wiltshire, was a title in the Baronetage of England. It was created on 11 March 1622 for Sir Henry Moody, later Member of Parliament for Malmesbury, who was the son of Richard Moody (died 1612), of Whitechurch-cum-Melbourne, Wiltshire, and of Westfields, Lea, Wiltshire, and the grandson of royal footman Edmund Moody who had been granted a coat-of-arms and the status of gentleman for saving the life of Henry VIII during a hunt.

G. E. Cokayne incorrectly states that Sir Henry Moody, 2nd Baronet, emigrated to the US with his mother Deborah, Lady Moody in 1636. In reality, the 2nd baronet was a signatory of the Scottish National Covenant, for which his estate was sequestrated but later discharged on 23 November 1646, and fought in the cavalry of the Scottish Engagers party at the Battle of Mauchline Muir on 12 June 1648, under the command of John Middleton, 1st Earl of Middleton, in which he was severely wounded.

In 1649, subsequent to the defeat of the royalist cause in the English Civil War, the 2nd baronet sold the estate of Garsdon to Sir Lawrence Washington, and, only in 1650, emigrated to Massachusetts, to which his mother, Deborah, Lady Moody, had emigrated in 1636. He died in the United States of America in September 1661 whilst indebted to various creditors.

G. E. Cokayne also incorrectly states that her son the 2nd baronet died without issue. In reality the 2nd baronet had at least one son, Captain John Moody (died 1673), who emigrated to St Michael, Barbados, where he has a memorial at St. Michael's Cathedral Church, in the cross-walk that runs from the south to the north porch. However, none of the 2nd baronet's sons claimed the baronetcy, which became extinct on the 2nd baronet's death.

== Moody baronets, of Garsdon (1622) ==
- Sir Henry Moody, 1st Baronet (c. 1582–1629)
- Sir Henry Moody, 2nd Baronet (c. 1607 – c. 1661)
