= Robert Hatton (Royalist) =

Sir Robert Hatton (died 10 January 1653) was an English landowner and politician who sat in the House of Commons at various times between 1621 and 1642. He supported the Royalist cause in the English Civil War.

Hatton was the second son of John Hatton of Longstanton, Cambridgeshire and his wife Joan Shute, daughter of Robert Shute (a baron of the Exchequer). He was admitted at Gray's Inn as of Clynton, Cambridgeshire on 2 February 1602. Sir Thomas Hatton, 1st Baronet was his brother. He inherited the estates of Oakington, Cambridgeshire from his mother and probably lived there from about 1610. He was knighted at Whitehall on 12 March 1617. He also possessed the property of Oswalds in Bishopsbourne.

He served for many years as steward to the Archbishop of Canterbury. In 1621, Hatton was elected Member of Parliament for Sandwich, but his election was declared void as the mayor had effectively disenfranchised part of the electorate. He was elected as MP for Sandwich in 1624 and 1625.

In 1641 Hatton was elected MP for Castle Rising in a by-election for the Long Parliament. He opposed the impeachment and attainder of Thomas Wentworth, 1st Earl of Strafford, the strongest of the King's ministers, for which act he was censured by the Commons. On the outbreak of the Civil War, he supported the King and was disabled from sitting in parliament on 7 September 1642 for executing a Commission of Array. He was appointed a Chamberlain of the Exchequer in 1644 but fled overseas after 1646 to escape his creditors. His estate at Oakington was under sequestration for ten years, and apparently not compounded for. On 1 July 1651 parliament directed for his estates to be sold.

Hatton died in 1653. He married Mary, daughter of Sir Robert Leigh of Chingford, Essex and had six children, four of whom died young. His only surviving son Robert died without issue in 1658. Hatton's only daughter Elizabeth married Sir Anthony Aucher, 1st Baronet who recovered Hatton's estates.

Parliament of England
Preceded by Sir Thomas Smith; Sir Samuel Peyton, 1st Baronet	Member of Parliament for Sandwich; 1621; With: Sir Edwin Sandys	Succeeded by Sir Edwin Sandys; John Burroughes
Preceded by Sir Edwin Sandys; John Burroughes	Member of Parliament for Sandwich; 1624–1626; With: Francis Drake (1624); Sir Henry Wotton (1625)	Succeeded by Sir John Suckling; Peter Peake
Preceded by Sir John Holland	Member of Parliament for Castle Rising; 1641–1642; With: Sir John Holland	Succeeded by Sir John Holland; John Spelman
