= Anthony Taylor (Medal of Honor) =

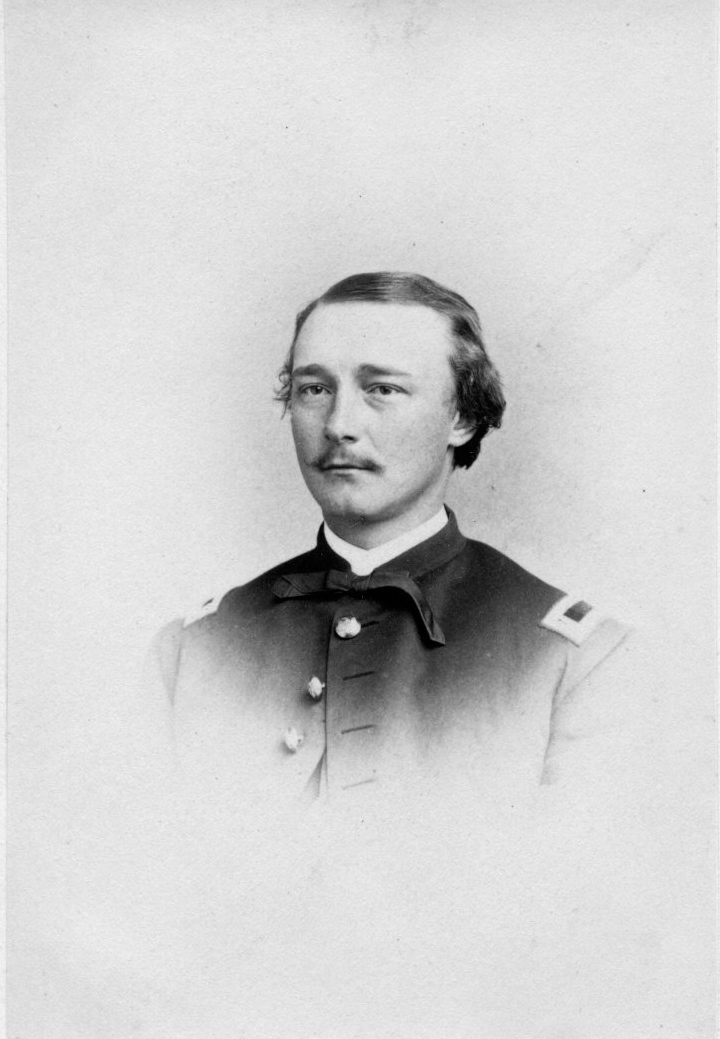
- Born: October 11, 1837; Burlington, New Jersey
- Died: May 21, 1894 (aged 56); Philadelphia, Pennsylvania
- Burial place: Church of St. James the Less, Philadelphia
- Military career
- Allegiance: United States of America; Union
- Branch: United States Army; Union Army
- Service years: 1861 – 1865
- Rank: First Lieutenant
- Units: Company A, 15th Pennsylvania Cavalry
- Conflicts: American Civil War
- Awards: Medal of Honor

Anthony Taylor (October 11, 1837 – May 21, 1894) was a Medal of Honor Recipient in the American Civil War.

== Biography ==
Anthony Taylor was born in Burlington County, New Jersey, on October 11, 1837, the son of Dr. Robert Taylor and Elizabeth Ash Jones. He was educated at the Episcopal Academy in Philadelphia.

Taylor entered service at Philadelphia, Pennsylvania, in Company A, 15th Pennsylvania Cavalry as a Private on August 22, 1861. He was promoted from Private to Sergeant, October 20, 1862; to 1st Sergeant, March 1, 1863; to 1st Lt., May 8, 1863. Shortly after enlisting, Taylor was in the Battle of Antietam. He then followed his regiment West to join the Army of the Cumberland at Nashville, where he participated in the Battle of Stones River. After being commissioned First Lieutenant in 1863 he was in command of Company A. He served on the battlefield at Chickamauga where he was in charge of the couriers at the headquarters of General William Rosecrans. As a First Lieutenant, Taylor was awarded the Medal of Honor for his bravery at the Battle of Chickamauga, Georgia, on September 20, 1863. Date of issue: December 4, 1893.

Taylor later took part in the Siege of Knoxville, Sevierville, Dandridge and the battle of Mossy Creek. On March 13, 1865, he was detailed acting Aide-de-Camp on the staff of Brevet Brigadier General William J. Palmer. He participated in the long campaign and cavalry raid from Knoxville, through North Carolina and Virginia, and south through North and South Carolina, Georgia and Alabama. Anthony Taylor carried the dispatch from General Palmer that led to the capture of Jefferson Davis, President of the Confederacy. He was signed as Commissioned Captain on June 1, 1865, Taylor was mustered out along with the regiment on June 21, 1865.

After leaving the Army, Taylor became actively involved in the coal business, working under the name of "Anthony Taylor and Company." He was also a member of the Military Order of the Loyal Legion of the United States. Taylor married Caroline Fletcher Johnson, daughter of Lawrence and Mary Winder Johnson, in Philadelphia on February 1, 1871. They were the parents of two children: Mary Lawrence Taylor, born January 5, 1872, and Elizabeth Emslie Taylor, born September 23, 1893. Anthony Taylor died in Philadelphia on May 21, 1894. His wife died on December 19, 1919, in Devon, Pennsylvania. Both are interred in the churchyard of the Church of St. James the Less in Philadelphia.

== Medal of Honor citation ==

Rank and Organization:

First Lieutenant, Company A, 15th Pennsylvania Cavalry. Place and date: At Chickamauga, Ga., September 20, 1863. Entered service at: Philadelphia, Pa. Born: October 11, 1837, Burlington, N.J. Date of issue: December 4, 1893.

Citation:

Held out to the last with a small force against the advance of superior numbers of the enemy.

== See also ==
- List of Medal of Honor recipients
- List of American Civil War Medal of Honor recipients: T–Z
