= Sir Henry Moody, 2nd Baronet =

English cavalier

- Born: c. 1607; Garsdon, Wiltshire, England
- Died: September 1661; United States of America
- Education: Magdalen Hall, Oxford; Gray's Inn
- Occupations: Landowner; cavalier; ambassador
- Children: Captain John Moody (d. 1673)
- Parents: Sir Henry Moody, 1st Baronet (father); Deborah, Lady Moody (mother)
- Relatives: Edmund Moody, royal footman who had been granted a coat-of-arms for saving the life of Henry VIII on a hunt (great-grandfather)

Sir Henry Moody, 2nd Baronet (c. 1607 – September 1661) was an English cavalier and emigrant to North America.

== Ancestry ==
Sir Henry was the eldest son of Wiltshire landowner Sir Henry Moody, 1st Baronet. He was the grandson of Richard Moody (d. 1612), of Whitechurch-cum-Melbourne, Wiltshire, and of Westfields, Lea, Wiltshire, and the great-grandson of royal footman Edmund Moody who had been granted a coat-of-arms for saving the life of Henry VIII on a hunt.

His mother was Deborah, Lady Moody, who was the daughter of Walter Dunch of Avebury, Wiltshire, and his wife Deborah Pilkington, who was the daughter of James Pilkington, Bishop of Durham. He had one sister and one illegitimate sibling whose mother was a woman called Margaret Harvard.

His mother was a Nonconformist and Anabaptist. After his father's death in 1629, she emigrated to Massachusetts in 1636. In 1643, she was granted land in the southwestern part of the Dutch settlement in western Long Island, where she founded Gravesend, Brooklyn between December 1654 and May 1659.

== Career ==
He matriculated at Magdalen Hall, Oxford, in 1621, was admitted to Gray's Inn in 1632, and received the degree of DCL in 1642.

=== English and Scottish Civil War ===
G. E. Cokayne incorrectly states that the 2nd baronet emigrated to North America with his mother Deborah in 1636. In reality, the 2nd baronet was a signatory of the Scottish National Covenant, for which his estate was sequestrated but later discharged on 23 November 1646, and he fought in the cavalry of the Scottish Engagers party at the Battle of Mauchline Muir on 12 June 1648, under the command of John Middleton, 1st Earl of Middleton, in which he was severely wounded.

In 1649, subsequent to the defeat of the royalist cause in the English Civil War, the 2nd baronet sold the Wiltshire estate of Garsdon to Sir Lawrence Washington. His relation Henry Moody, a London merchant who was listed as a member of the landed gentry in 1673, married Hannah Washington, who was the daughter of the merchant Robert Washington (b. 1616, Adwick le Street, Yorkshire, d. 1674, Rotterdam) of Austhorpe Hall, Leeds, who descended from Sir John Washington (d. 1331) (who was the brother of Sir Robert Washington (d. 1324) who was the progenitor of the branch of the Washington family that resided at Sulgrave Manor from whom the founder of the United States was descended).

G. E. Cokayne also incorrectly states that the 2nd baronet died without issue. In reality the 2nd baronet had at least one son, Captain John Moody (d. 1673), who emigrated to St Michael, Barbados, where he has a memorial at St. Michael's Cathedral Church, in the cross-walk that runs from the south to the north porch. None of the 2nd baronet's sons claimed the baronetcy, which became extinct on the 2nd baronet's death.

=== Emigration to America ===
Only in 1650 did the 2nd baronet emigrate to Massachusetts, to which his mother, Deborah, Lady Moody, had emigrated in 1636. He moved to New Amsterdam in 1661 and later to Virginia.

The 2nd baronet served in Massachusetts on two embassies: one to Manhattan for which he was paid in tobacco, of which he received 11,000 pounds, and one to Virginia, on which he died, in September 1661, at the house of Colonel Morritson, whilst indebted to various creditors.
