= Church of St. James the Less (Philadelphia) =

Historic church in Pennsylvania, United States

- St. James-the-Less Episcopal Church
- U.S. National Register of Historic Places
- U.S. National Historic Landmark
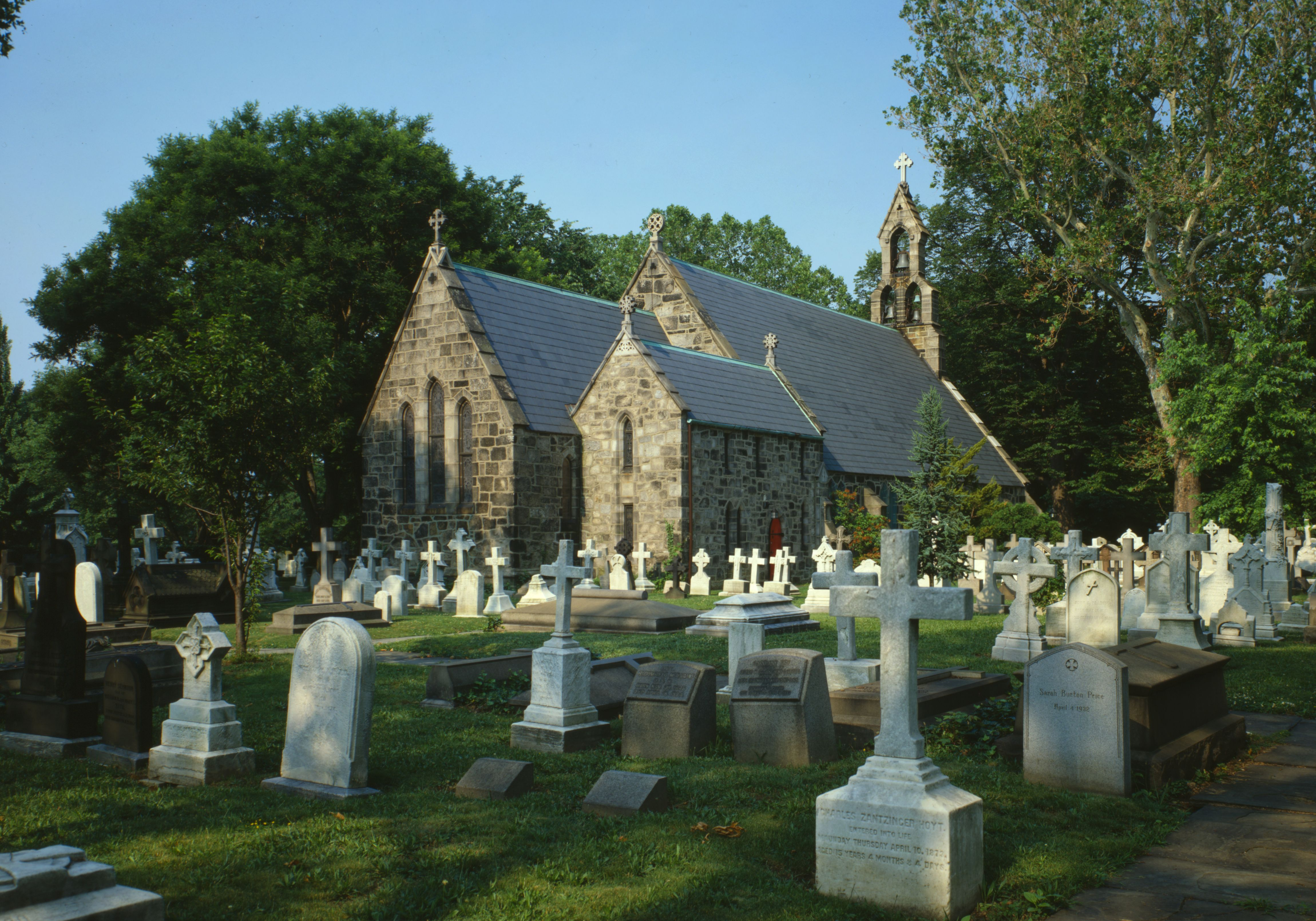
- Location: Hunting Park Ave. at Clearfield St. Philadelphia, Pennsylvania
- Coordinates: 40°0′14″N 75°10′59″W
- Built: 1846
- Architect: George Gordon Place, John E. Carver
- Architectural style: Gothic Revival
- NRHP reference No.: 74001801

Significant dates
- Added to NRHP: November 20, 1974
- Designated NHL: February 4, 1985

The Church of St. James the Less is a historic Episcopal church in Philadelphia, Pennsylvania, United States, that was architecturally influential. As St. James-the-Less Episcopal Church, it was designated a National Historic Landmark for its Gothic Revival architecture, which influenced a generation of subsequent churches.

== History ==
Philanthropist and merchant Robert Ralston wanted to found a church near his land on Ridge Road, but died shortly before this church's founding. His friend Samuel Jarvis had helped found the General Theological Seminary in New York and knew about the Cambridge Camden Society. On May 22, 1846, the congregation was admitted to the Episcopal Diocese of Pennsylvania and on September 26th, took the corporate name of "Rector, Church Wardens and Vestrymen of St. James the Less." The new congregation acquired land from nearby Laurel Hill Cemetery to build a church that could serve not only the wealthy families with mansions overlooking the Schuylkill River or on Hunting Park Avenue, but also the working-class people of the nearby industrial neighborhood, now known as Allegheny West.

The parish was traditionally Tractarian or High Church in churchmanship orientation. It chose to not install gas lighting when the opportunity was presented in 1869, but did allow oil lamps to replace the original candles circa 1885. Further modernization occurred in the early 20th century, including not only the tower and chimes, which were dedicated in 1910, but also electric lighting and central heat around 1913.

Documents exist concerning its Anglo-Catholic practices in the early 20th century.

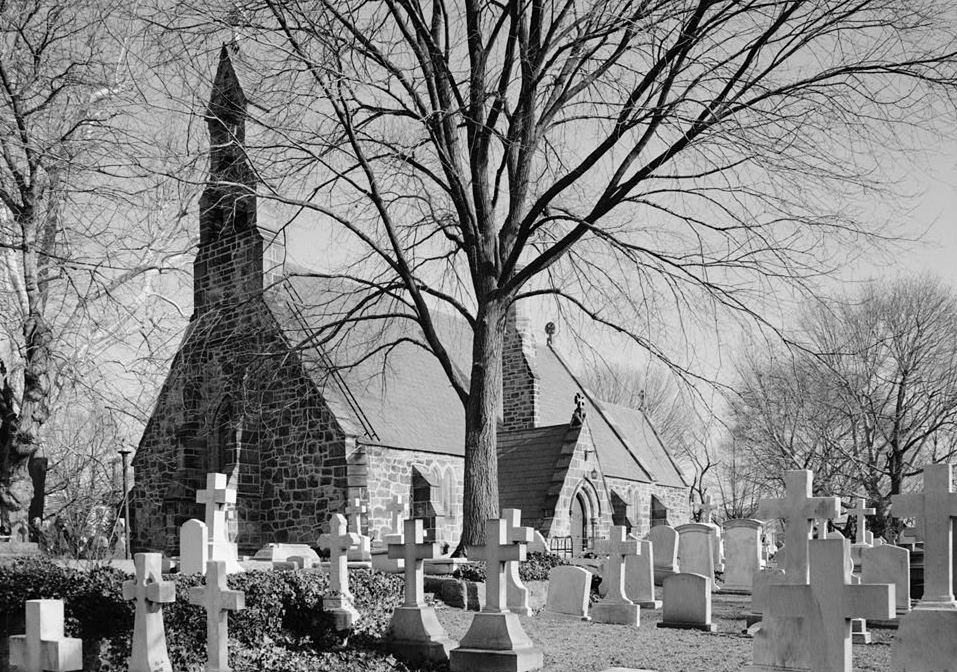
HABS Front view of the church in 1972

== Architecture ==
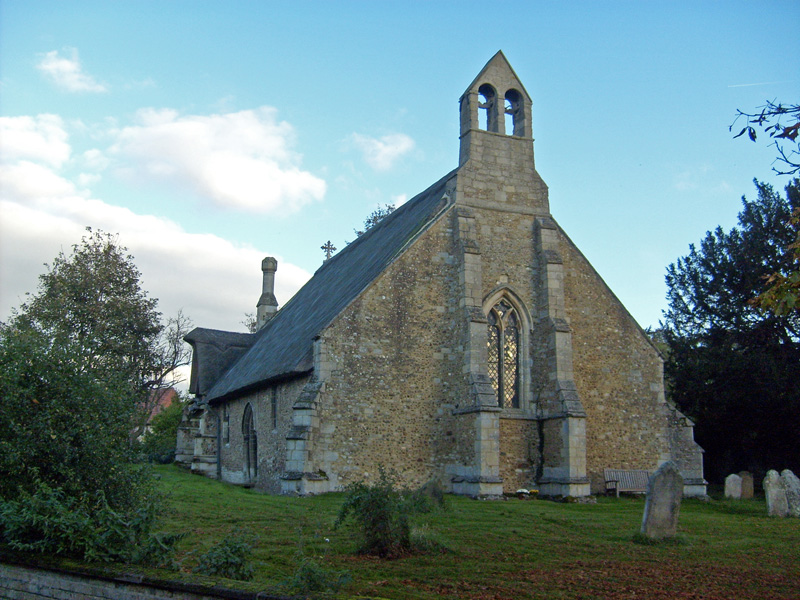
St. Michael's Church, now disused, Longstanton, Cambridgeshire, England, the model for St. James-the-Less

The Gothic architecture was nearly accidental. The congregation applied to the Cambridge Camden Society, which in 1841 and 1844 had published a widely circulated pamphlet on modern church design, for a set of approved plans. Originally an organization formed by Cambridge University students interested in gothic architecture, the group advocated combining the piety of gothic architecture with church reform associated with the Oxford Movement. It was inadvertently sent measured drawings prepared by English architect George Gordon Place for St. Michael's Church in Longstanton, Cambridgeshire, built circa 1230, which were then followed in every detail under the supervision of architect John E. Carver.

The building was added to the list of National Register of Historic Places in 1974 and designated a National Historic Landmark in 1985. The National Park Service called it "the first example of the pure English Parish church style in America, and one of the best examples of a 19th-century American Gothic church for its coherence and authenticity of design. Its influence on the major architects of the Gothic Revival in the United States was profound." Later American churches, also on the National Register of Historic Places, influenced by St. James' design include All Saints Memorial Church (Navesink, New Jersey) designed by Richard Upjohn first President of the American Institute of Architects, and St. Peter's Episcopal Church Neligh, Nebraska.

The setting on the edge of a hill, north of Mount Vernon Cemetery and east of Laurel Hill Cemetery, is no longer rural. West Hunting Park Avenue, a major artery, is just beyond the churchyard's south wall and industrial buildings lie directly to the west.

The Wanamaker Memorial Bell Tower and mausoleum (1908), designed by John T. Windrim, houses a set of J.C. Deagan, Inc. tower chimes and a chime of bells by the McShane foundry. A parish hall, which later housed the parish school, was built on the opposite side of West Clearfield Street.

== Current parish(es) ==
The congregation of St. James the Less began withholding diocesan payments in protest over the ordination of women. After the bishop refused to renew the preaching license of assistant the Rev. Arthur Willis in 1999, the congregation attempted to form a nonprofit corporation and transfer the church property into it.

In 2001, the diocese initiated litigation to seize its property and two years later the Philadelphia County Court of Common Pleas ruled that the attempted merger was ultra vires and invalid. The departing congregation lost two subsequent appeals, first to Commonwealth Court and then to the Supreme Court of Pennsylvania. After the Supreme Court's decision, the Diocese assumed control of the St. James property.

In 2008, the diocese's Standing Committee voted to allow St. Mark's Church in Philadelphia to adopt the Church of St. James the Less as a mission. Weekly celebration of Mass resumed on Sundays at 5:00 pm. The departing congregation largely entered the Roman Catholic Church under the provision of the Personal Ordinariate of the Chair of St. Peter established by Pope Benedict.

== School ==
During the controversy, the parish school closed circa 2006. As part of its mandate, Saint Mark's Church began a fundraising effort to open a new parish school to serve this local community. In 2009 and 2010, the St. Mark's congregation (together with St. Francis Episcopal Church in Potomac, Maryland) sponsored Vacation Bible School at the historic church school. The following fall, a successful after-school program began, staff were hired, and renovations began. In September 2011, Saint James School, covering grades five to eight, opened. It is part of the NativityMiguel Network of Schools and the National Association of Episcopal Schools.

== Notable interments ==
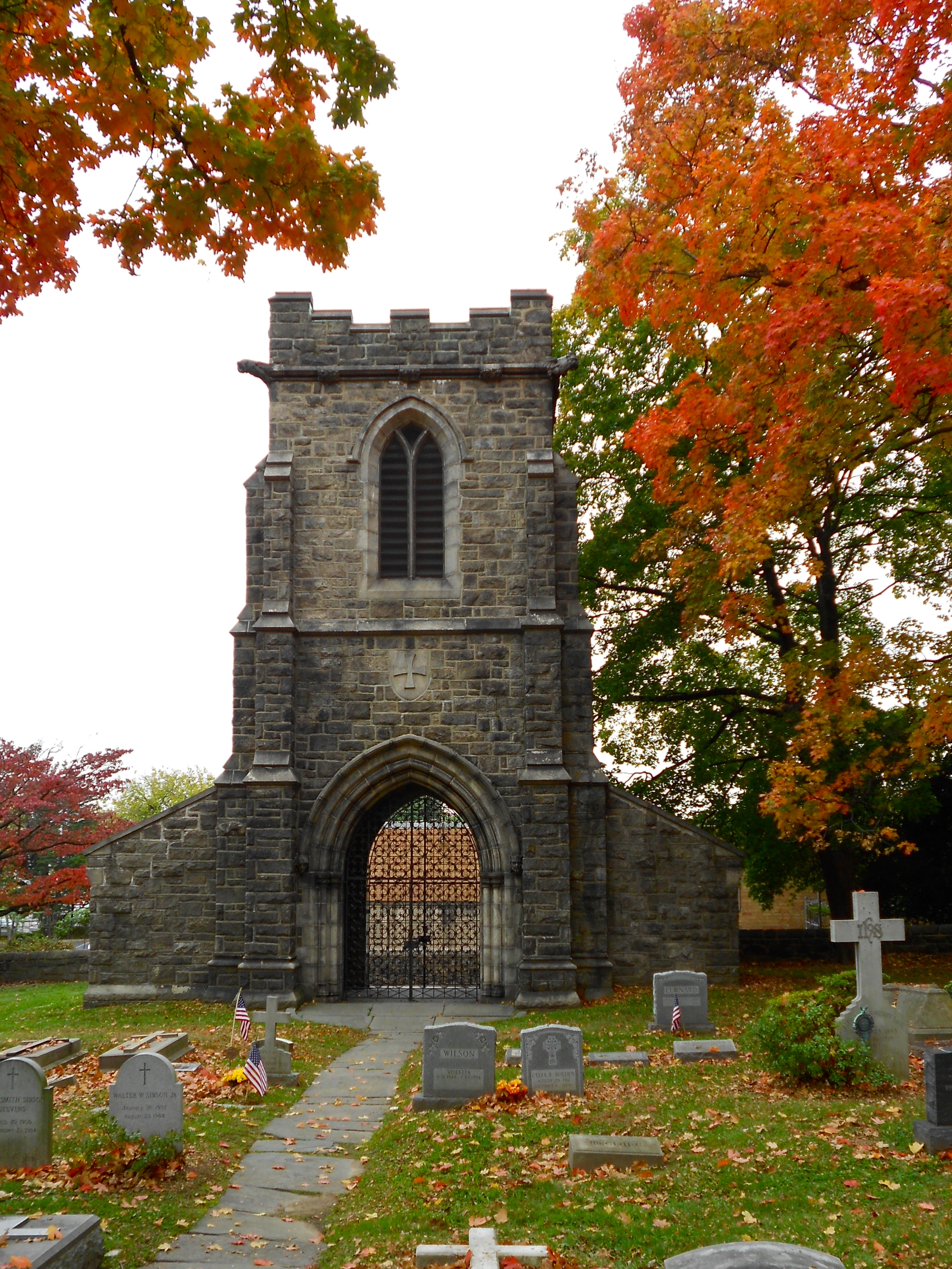
Wanamaker Memorial Bell Tower and Mausoleum (1908), John T. Windrim, architect.

The surrounding churchyard is the final resting place of several notable people. The cemetery is open to the public when the school is in session, generally weekdays from 7am–6pm, and on the weekends during school events.

- Chapman Biddle (January 22, 1822 – December 9, 1880), Civil War Union Army officer.
- Horace Binney (January 4, 1780 – August 12, 1875), US Congressman.
- F. Carroll Brewster (May 15, 1825 – December 30, 1898), prominent Philadelphia lawyer, judge, and State Attorney General
- Mark Wilkes Collet (June 2, 1826 – May 3, 1863), Civil War Union Army officer and physician.
- Constance Dallas (April 28, 1902 – January 13, 1983), first woman elected to Philadelphia City Council.
- William Chauncey Emhardt, ecumenist and author
- James Barnet Fry (February 22, 1827 – July 11, 1894), Civil War Union brigadier general.
- John R. Goldsborough (July 2, 1809 – June 22, 1877), Civil War Union naval officer and later United States Navy commodore
- Faustina Hasse Hodges (7 August 1822 – 4 February 1895), English-American organist and composer
- Henry K. Hoff (d. December 25, 1878), United States Navy Rear-Admiral.
- Emlen Trenchard Littell, American church architect
- Robert Morris, Jr. (d. August 13, 1863), Civil War Union Army officer.
- The Rt. Rev. Henry Ustick Onderdonk, second bishop of the Episcopal Diocese of Pennsylvania
- John Grubb Parke (September 22, 1827 – December 16, 1900), Civil War Union Major General.
- William Stevens Perry (January 22, 1832 – May 13, 1898), historian, author, president of Hobart College, and second bishop of the Episcopal Diocese of Iowa.
- Walter Elmer Schofield (September 10, 1867 – March 1, 1944), American Impressionist painter.
- Anthony Taylor (October 11, 1837 – May 21, 1894), Civil War Medal of Honor Recipient.
- Martin Russell Thayer (1819–1906), US Congressman for Pennsylvania, 1863 to 1867. State Court Judge in 1867.
- Benjamin Chew Tilghman (October 26, 1821 – July 3, 1901), Civil War Union Brevet Brigadier General, inventor of sandblasting.
- Stephen Decatur Trenchard (July 11, 1818 – November 15, 1883), United States Navy Rear-Admiral.
- John Wanamaker (July 11, 1838 – December 12, 1922), businessman, founder of chain of Wanamaker's Department Stores of Philadelphia and New York, founder of Bethany Presbyterian Church and a prominent Christian layman, and Postmaster General of the United States.
- (Lewis) Rodman Wanamaker (13 February 1863 – 9 March 1928), son of John Wanamaker, philanthropist, artistic benefactor and patron of the Wanamaker Organ.
- William Halsey Wood (April 24, 1855 – March 13, 1897), architect, one of four finalists in the competition for the design of the Cathedral of St. John the Divine.

== See also ==
- List of National Historic Landmarks in Philadelphia
- National Register of Historic Places listings in North Philadelphia

== Gallery ==
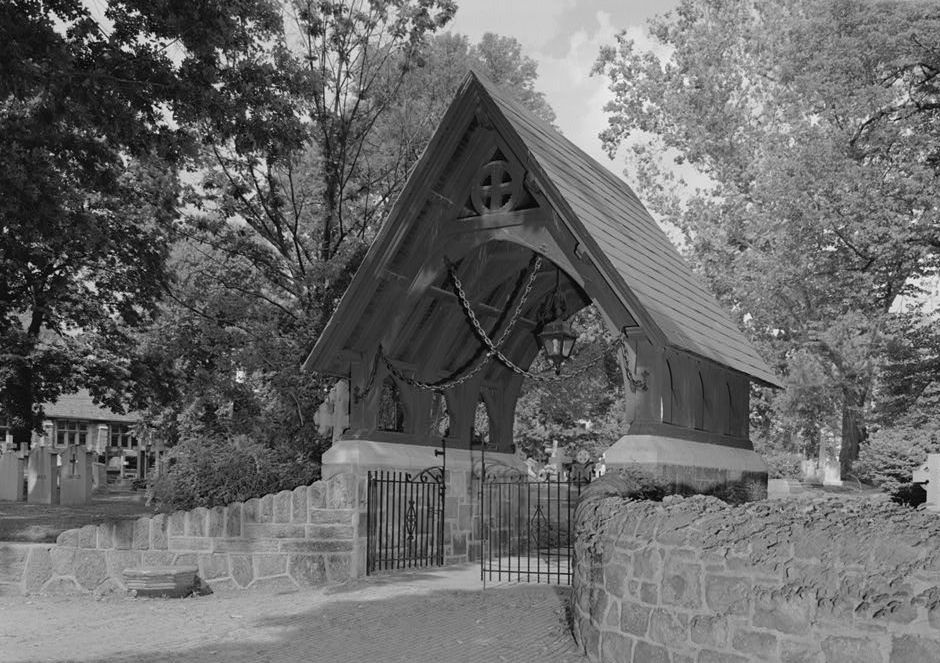
Lychgate at St. James the Less

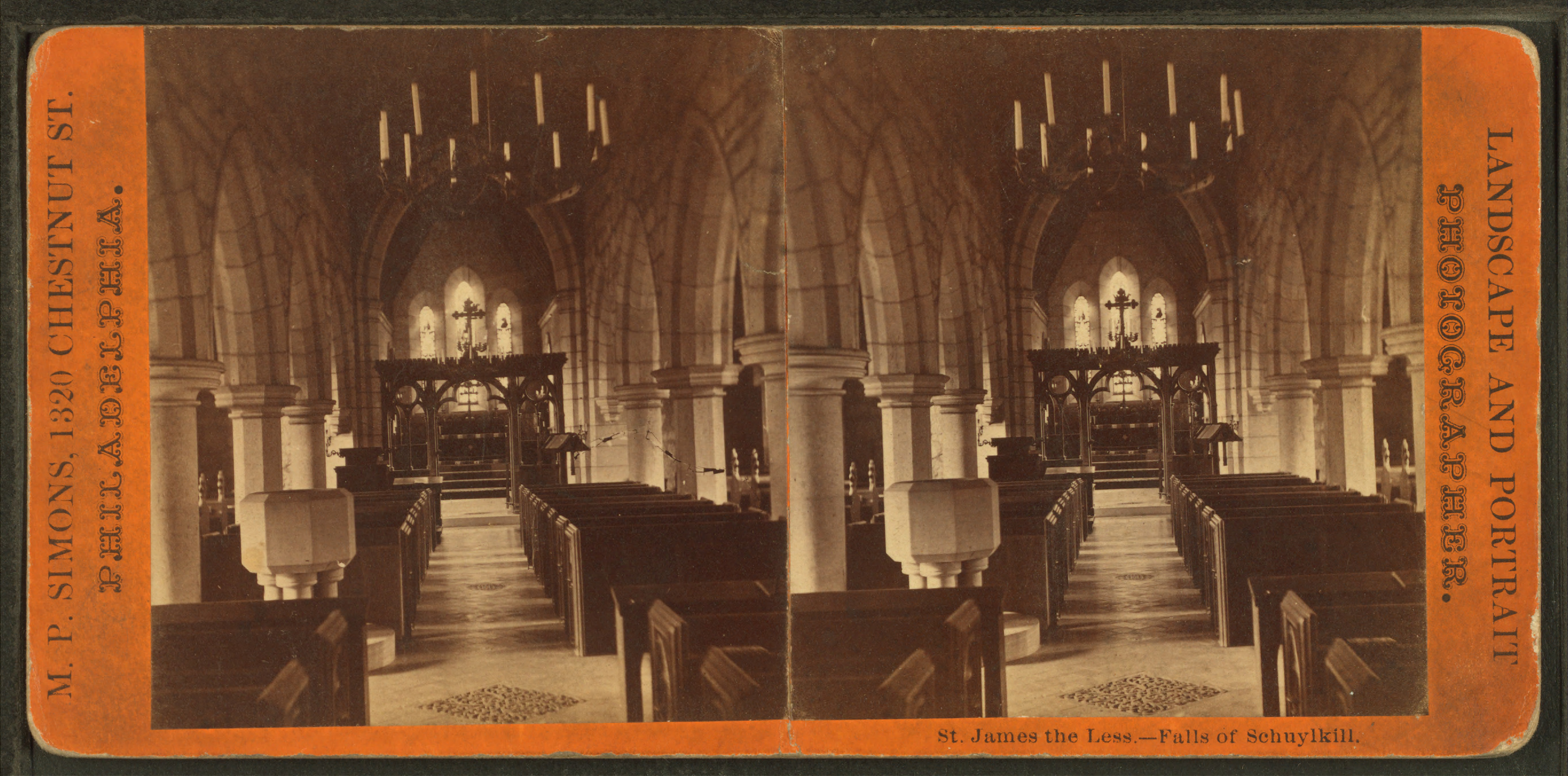
Church interior, circa 1870s-90s

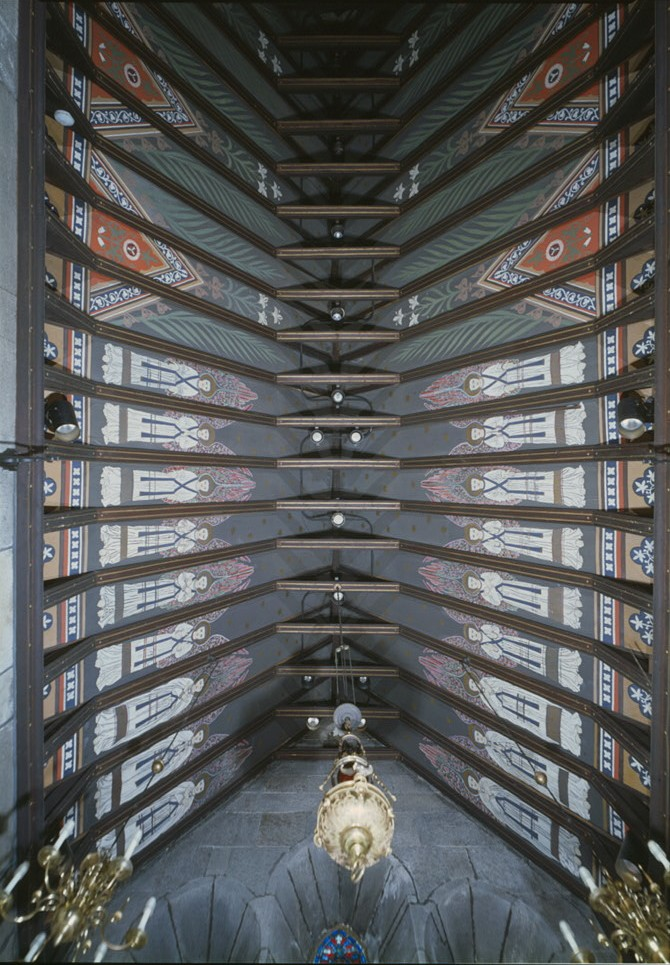
Painted ceiling of the chancel
