= Sir Thomas Hatton, 1st Baronet =

English politician

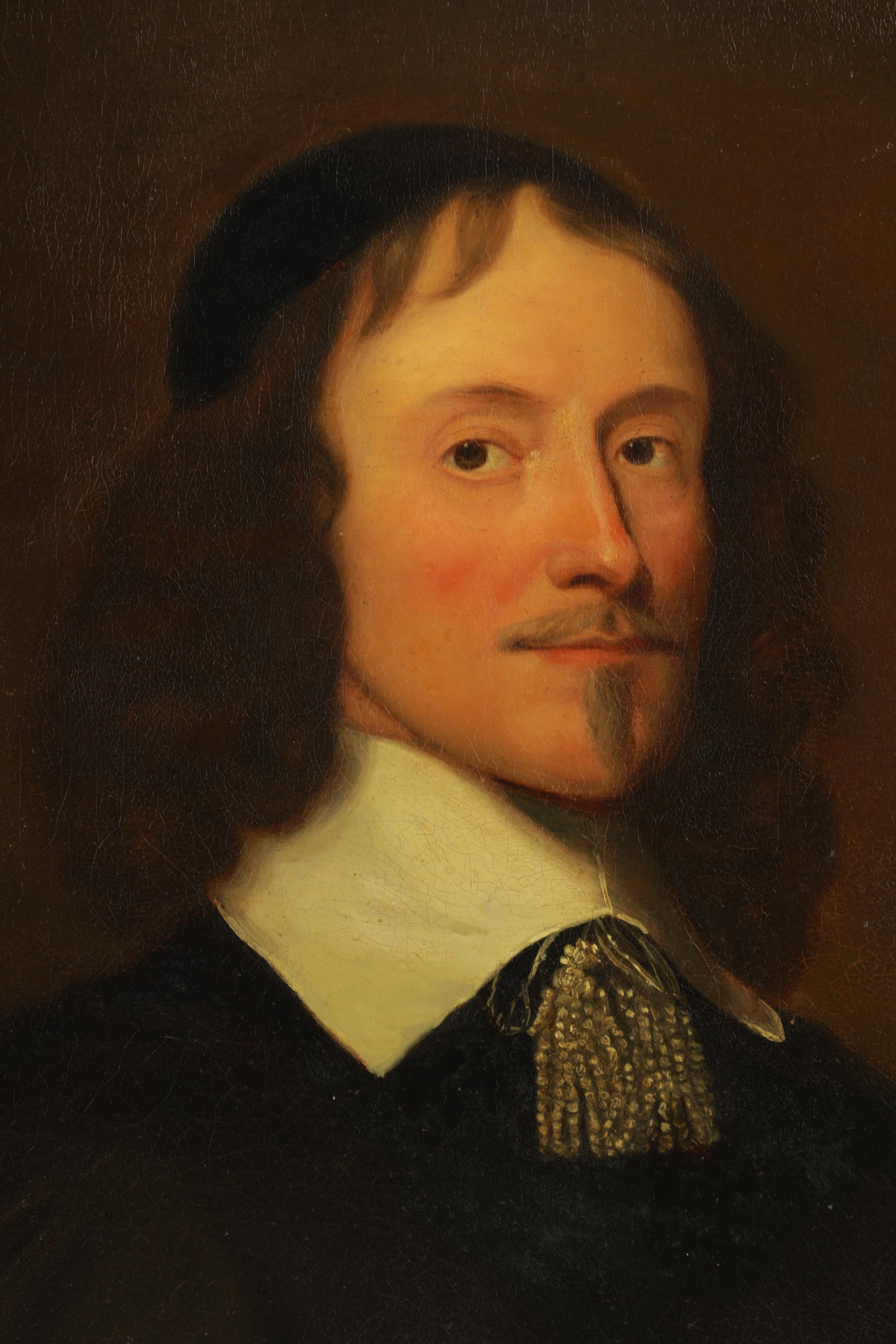
Sir Thomas Hatton c.1641

Sir Thomas Hatton, 1st Baronet (c.1583 – 23 September 1658) was an English politician who sat in the House of Commons of England variously between 1621 and 1640.

Hatton was the son of John Hatton of Longstanton, Cambridgeshire and his wife Jane Shute, daughter of Robert Shute, Baron of the Exchequer, and justice of the Court of Common Pleas. His father's first cousin was Sir Christopher Hatton (1540-1591), Queen Elizabeth I's favourite. Sir Robert Hatton, the politician and landowner, was his brother. His other younger brother was Christopher Hatton, namesake and next heir of Sir Christopher Hatton of Kirby.

Hatton was elected Member of Parliament for Corfe Castle from 1621 to 1622 and for Malmesbury from 1624 to 1625. In 1628 Hatton was elected MP for Stamford until 1629 when King Charles decided to rule without parliament. In April 1640, he was re-elected for Stamford in the Short Parliament He was created a baronet, of Longstanton, Cambridgeshire, by King Charles I on 5 July 1641.

Hatton died at the age of 75.

Hatton married Mary Alington, daughter of Sir Giles Alington (1572-1638) of Horseheath, Cambridgeshire and Lady Dorothy Cecil, daughter of Thomas Cecil, 1st Earl of Exeter. His sons, Thomas (2nd Baronet) and Christopher (5th Baronet), succeeded successively to the baronetcy. His daughter, Mary Elizabeth Hatton, married Sir William Boteler of Kinton, Bedfordshire.

Parliament of England
Preceded by Sir Thomas Tracie; John Dackombe	Member of Parliament for Corfe Castle; 1621–1622; With: Sir Thomas Hammond	Succeeded by Sir Francis Nethersole; Sir Peter Osborne
Preceded by Sir Henry Poole; Sir Edward Wardour	Member of Parliament for Malmesbury; 1624–1625; With: Sir Edward Wardour	Succeeded by Sir Henry Moody, Bt; Sir Edward Wardour
Preceded by Montagu Bertie; Brian Palmes	Member of Parliament for Stamford; 1628–1629; With: Sir Edward Bashe	Parliament suspended until 1640
Parliament suspended since 1629	Member of Parliament for Stamford; 1640; With: Thomas Hatcher	Succeeded by Geoffrey Palmer; Thomas Hatcher
Baronetage of England
New creation	Baronet (of Long Stanton); 1641–1658	Succeeded by Thomas Hatton
