= Pell Office =

Historic department of the British government

The Pell Office was a department of the Exchequer in which the receipts and payments were entered upon two rolls of parchment, the one called the introitta, which was the record of monies received, and the other the exitus, or the record of monies issued. A statement of all moneys issued was entered by the Clerk of the Pells on the issue roll. In 1552 the unreliable "Declarations of the State of the Treasury" were replaced by declarations made by the Clerk of the Pells,

== Etymology ==
Up to the reign of King James I entries recording Treasury transactions were made upon rolls, or pells, from the Latin pellis meaning "skin, hide, pelt". From the reign of James I Treasury records have been entered in books.

== Location ==
The Pell Office was situated on the eastern side of Westminster Hall until the beginning of the 19th century. Some early Treasury records were kept in the nearby Chapter House of Westminster Abbey. The office was damp and was liable to destruction by fire due to the many wooden partitions within it and the many hearths used for heating. In 1820 the records were reported to be dry and well-aired, but were piled up on the floor of a room too small to contain them properly. In 1822 they were transferred to attic storage in Somerset House and were "heaped in some places up to the ceiling and in an exceedingly dirty state". In 1840 the records were taken to the Comptroller of the Exchequer's Office in Whitehall Yard, where they were thoroughly cleaned and re-bundled. They were then placed on racks in Rolls House in 1841 where they were catalogued and labelled. They were then transferred to the new Public Record Office in Chancery Lane, from where they have more recently been moved to the National Archives site at Kew.

== Clerks of the Pells ==
This is a list of the Clerks of the Pells in the English Exchequer. Similar offices existed in Scotland and Ireland.

- 1516–1549: John Uvedale
- 1555–1560: Edmund Cockerell
- 1560–1570: Robert Hare
- 1570–?1611: Chidiock Wardour (died 1611)
- 1603-1611: Edward Wardour (jointly)
- 1611–1637: Edward Wardour
- 1637–1643: Edward Wardour (jointly) (died 1646)
- 1646–: William Wardour
- Commonwealth
- 1660–?1698: William Wardour (restored) (died 1699)
- 1698–1721: Henry Pelham (died 1754)
- 1721–1739: Robert Walpole, Viscount Walpole
- 1739–?1784: Hon. Sir Edward Walpole (died 1784)
- 1784–1802: Isaac Barré (blind 1784, died 1802)
- 1802–1823: Hon. Henry Addington jnr (died insane 1823)
- 1823–1825: Edward Roberts
- 1825–1834: Henry Ellis
- 1834 Post abolished
