= Sir Henry Moody, 1st Baronet =

English politician

- Born: c. 1582; Garsdon, Wiltshire, England
- Died: 23 April 1629; Garsdon, Wiltshire, England
- Occupations: Landowner; politician
- Spouse: Deborah Dunch
- Children: Sir Henry Moody, 2nd Baronet

Sir Henry Moody, 1st Baronet (c. 1582 – 23 April 1629) was an English landowner in Wiltshire who sat as an MP in the House of Commons between 1625 and 1629.

== Ancestry ==
Sir Henry was the eldest son of Richard Moody (d. 1612), of Whitechurch-cum-Melbourne, Wiltshire, and of Westfields, Lea, Wiltshire, and the grandson of royal footman Edmund Moody who had been granted a coat-of-arms for saving the life of Henry VIII on a hunt.

Sir Henry's mother was Christiana Barwick, who was the daughter of John Barwick, of Wilcot, Wiltshire. Sir Henry's ancestry was recorded back to the 15th century, during which the Moody family had moved from Worcestershire to Malmesbury, Wiltshire, where they leased property and pastureland from Malmesbury Abbey.

The Moody family came to prominence amongst the landed gentry of Wiltshire by to their acquisition, by royal grant, of several of the Abbey's estates, including Garsdon manor, subsequent to the Dissolution of the Monasteries. By 1544 the Moody family had acquired the Whitchurch and Cleverton manors, both near Malmesbury, and extensive acreage elsewhere.

== Career ==
He was knighted at Whitehall on 18 March 1606. From 1618 to 1619, he was Sheriff of Wiltshire. He was created baronet on 11 March 1622.

In 1625, he was elected Member of Parliament for Malmesbury. He was re-elected in 1626 and in 1628, after which he sat until 1629 when King Charles began to rule without parliament for eleven years.

Moody died at Garsdon, on 23 April 1629, about a month after the dissolution of Parliament, at the age of about 46.

== Marriage ==
Moody married, on 20 January 1606, Deborah Dunch, who was the daughter of Walter Dunch of Avebury, Wiltshire, and his wife Deborah Pilkington, who was the daughter of James Pilkington, Bishop of Durham. Moody and his wife had one son, also Henry, who inherited the baronetcy, and who became a cavalier during the English Civil War, and one daughter. Moody also had one illegitimate child with a woman called Margaret Harvard.

His wife was a Nonconformist and Anabaptist. After Moody's death in 1629, she emigrated to Massachusetts in 1636. In 1643, she was granted land in the southwestern part of the Dutch settlement in western Long Island, where she founded Gravesend, Brooklyn between December 1654 and May 1659.

=== Descent ===
G. E. Cokayne incorrectly states that his heir the 2nd baronet died without issue. In reality the 2nd baronet had at least one son, Captain John Moody (d. 1673), who emigrated to St Michael, Barbados, where he has a memorial at St. Michael's Cathedral Church, in the cross-walk that runs from the south to the north porch. However, none of the 2nd baronet's sons claimed the baronetcy, which became extinct on the 2nd baronet's death.

Parliament of England
Preceded by Sir Edward Wardour; Thomas Hatton	Member of Parliament for Malmesbury; 1625–1629; With: Sir Edward Wardour 1625; Sir William Croft 1626–1629	Parliament suspended until 1640
Baronetage of England
New creation	Baronet (of Garsdon); 1622–1629	Succeeded by Henry Moody
