= Edward Wardour =

English office holder and politician

Sir Edward Wardour (died 14 March 1645/6) was an English officeholder and politician who sat in the House of Commons between 1621 and 1625.

Wardour was a native a Malmesbury and held the office of Clerk of the Pells. He was knighted by the King at Whitehall on 20 July 1618. In 1621, he was elected Member of Parliament for Malmesbury. He was re-elected MP for Malmesbury in 1624 and 1625.

Wardour died in 1646 and was buried at All Saints Church, Oxford.

Wardour married Jane Bowdler, who died on 20 January 1652 and was buried by him.

Parliament of England
| Preceded by Sir Roger Dallyson; Sir Neville Poole | Member of Parliament for Malmesbury; 1621–1625; With: Sir Henry Poole 1621–1622; Thomas Hatton 1624; Sir Henry Moody, 1st Baronet 1625 | Succeeded by Sir Henry Moody, 1st Baronet; Sir William Crofts |
