= Lea, Wiltshire =

Village in Wiltshire, England

Coordinates: 51.578°N 2.061°W

Lea
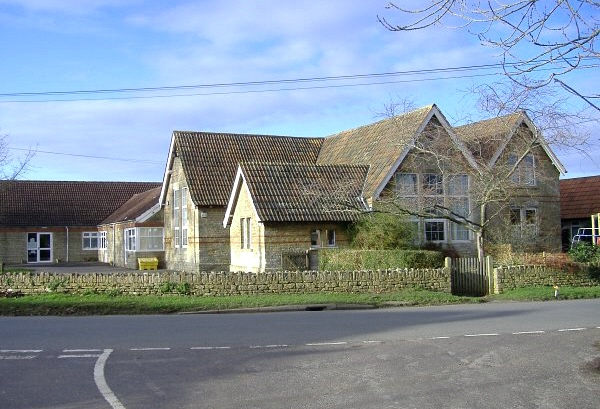
- Lea & Garsdon Primary School

- Location within Wiltshire
- Population: 812 (in 2011)
- OS grid reference: ST958866
- Civil parish: Lea and Cleverton
- Unitary authority: Wiltshire
- Ceremonial county: Wiltshire
- Region: South West
- Country: England
- Sovereign state: United Kingdom
- Post town: Malmesbury
- Postcode district: SN16
- Dialling code: 01666
- Police: Wiltshire
- Fire: Dorset and Wiltshire
- Ambulance: South Western
- UK Parliament: South Cotswolds
- Website: Parish Council

Lea is a village in Wiltshire, England, lying approximately 1.5 miles (2.4 km) east of Malmesbury. It is part of the civil parish of Lea and Cleverton which includes the village of Garsdon and the hamlet of Cleverton. Garsdon was a separate parish until 1934.

The Charlton Stream forms the western boundary of the parish, and joins the River Avon near Cowbridge in the southwest of the parish. The Woodbridge Brook flows east–west across the parish to join the Charlton Stream northwest of Lea village. The southern boundary of the parish follows approximately the B4042 Swindon–Malmesbury road.

== History ==
An early resident of Lea, in 1340, was Ralph of Combe and his name survives in the name applied to the south west corner of the village of Lea, which is Combe Green (Ordnance Survey spelling), sometimes misspelt as Coombe Green.

A school was built at Lea in 1873, replacing an earlier one-room school. Children of all ages attended until 1954 when older pupils transferred to Malmesbury School; in 1976 the school buildings were extended.

The population of the parish peaked at 494 at the 1871 census, declined to 337 in 1931 and then increased as new housing was built, almost all in Lea village.

When Sidney Herbert was created Baron Herbert of Lea in 1861, his new title referred to this village.

=== Garsdon ===
The Domesday Book of 1068 recorded a settlement of 17 households at Gardone, and land held by Malmesbury Abbey. The abbey retained the land until the Dissolution of the Monasteries, after which it was granted to Richard Moody (d. 1612) after whose death it was inherited by his eldest son Sir Henry Moody, 1st Baronet.

In 1649, subsequent to the defeat of the royalist cause in the English Civil War, Sir Henry Moody, 2nd Baronet, sold the estate of Garsdon to Sir Lawrence Washington (1622–1662), and in 1650 he emigrated to Massachusetts, to which his mother Lady Deborah Moody had emigrated in 1636. Lawrence Washington was elected MP for Malmesbury in 1661.

Garsdon church has Washington family graves and a memorial. The branch of the family that descend from Lawrence Washington (1602–1652) are ancestors of George Washington, the founder and first President of the United States.

The manor passed by marriage to Sir Robert Shirley, later Earl Ferrers, in 1671; his grandson sold it to Paul Methuen in 1758, and in turn his grandson sold it in 1843 to Thomas Howard, Earl of Suffolk and Berkshire, who also owned the nearby Charlton estate. The Howards sold the manor and farm in the 1930s.

The manor house is from the 14th century, with additions in the 17th century and later, and is Grade II* listed.

In the late 17th century the main Oxford-Bristol road ran east–west through Garsdon parish, following the ridge in the east of the parish.

The boundary between Lea and Garsdon parishes followed roughly the course of the Woodbridge Brook. Population of the parish peaked at 234 in 1831 and then declined, reaching 119 in 1931. Garsdon was added to Lea parish in 1934.

== Religious sites ==
=== Anglican ===
An early chapel at Lea had been annexed to Garsdon rectory by the mid 16th century. In the earlier 20th century, Garsdon and Lea and Cleverton were considered a united benefice; in 1987 the rectory of Garsdon with Lea and Cleverton was united with Charlton vicarage. Today the churches at Lea and Garsdon are part of the Woodbridge Group of six rural churches.

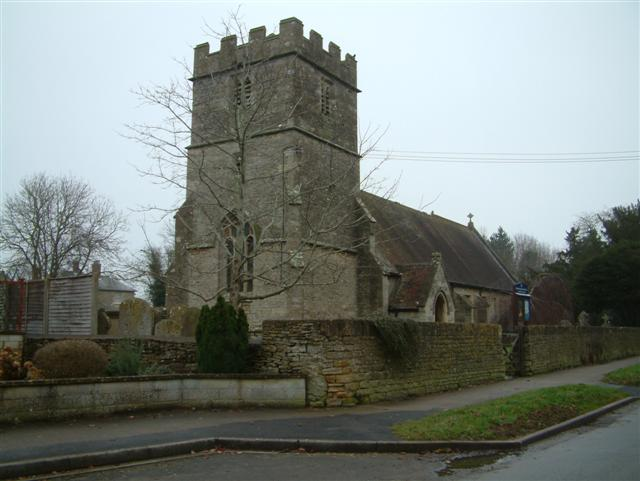
St Giles', Lea

The church of St Giles, Lea, has a 15th-century west tower; the rest was rebuilt and enlarged during restoration in 1878.

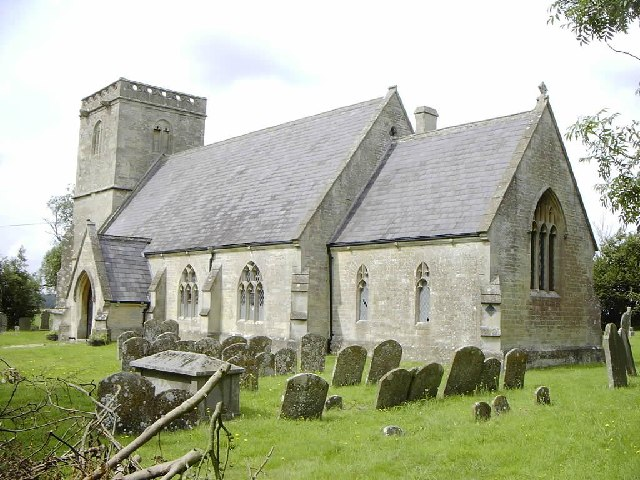
All Saints', Garsdon

There was a church at Garsdon in 1265. The tower of All Saints' church is from the 15th and 16th centuries; the rest was rebuilt and enlarged in 1856.

=== Others ===
Calvinistic Methodists built Zion chapel in Lea village c.1808, which was rebuilt in 1861. It was later used by Congregationalists and then Baptists, who continue to use it in 2018.

Primitive Methodists built Jubilee Chapel at Garsdon Heath, northeast of Garsdon village, in 1860. The building remained in use until the late 20th century or early 21st, but by 2012 had become a private house.

Primitive Methodists also built a chapel at Cleverton in 1874, replacing an earlier chapel. The building was still in use in 2018.

== Facilities ==
Lea & Garsdon CE Primary School serves Lea, Cleverton, Garsdon and Charlton. The village has a public house, the Rose and Crown, and a village hall. Other facilities in the village include a tennis court, a table tennis table, a former telephone box converted to a library and a children's play area.

Lea had a cricket team between 2002 and 2009: the "Lea Lackadasicals". They played around ten friendly matches a year, normally on a Sunday afternoon.

== Local government ==
Lea and Cleverton is a civil parish with an elected parish council, which styles itself as Lea, Garsdon and Cleverton Parish Council. It is in the area of Wiltshire Council, a unitary authority, which is responsible for most local government functions.
