= St Michael's Church, Longstanton =

Coordinates: 52.2730°N 0.0548°E

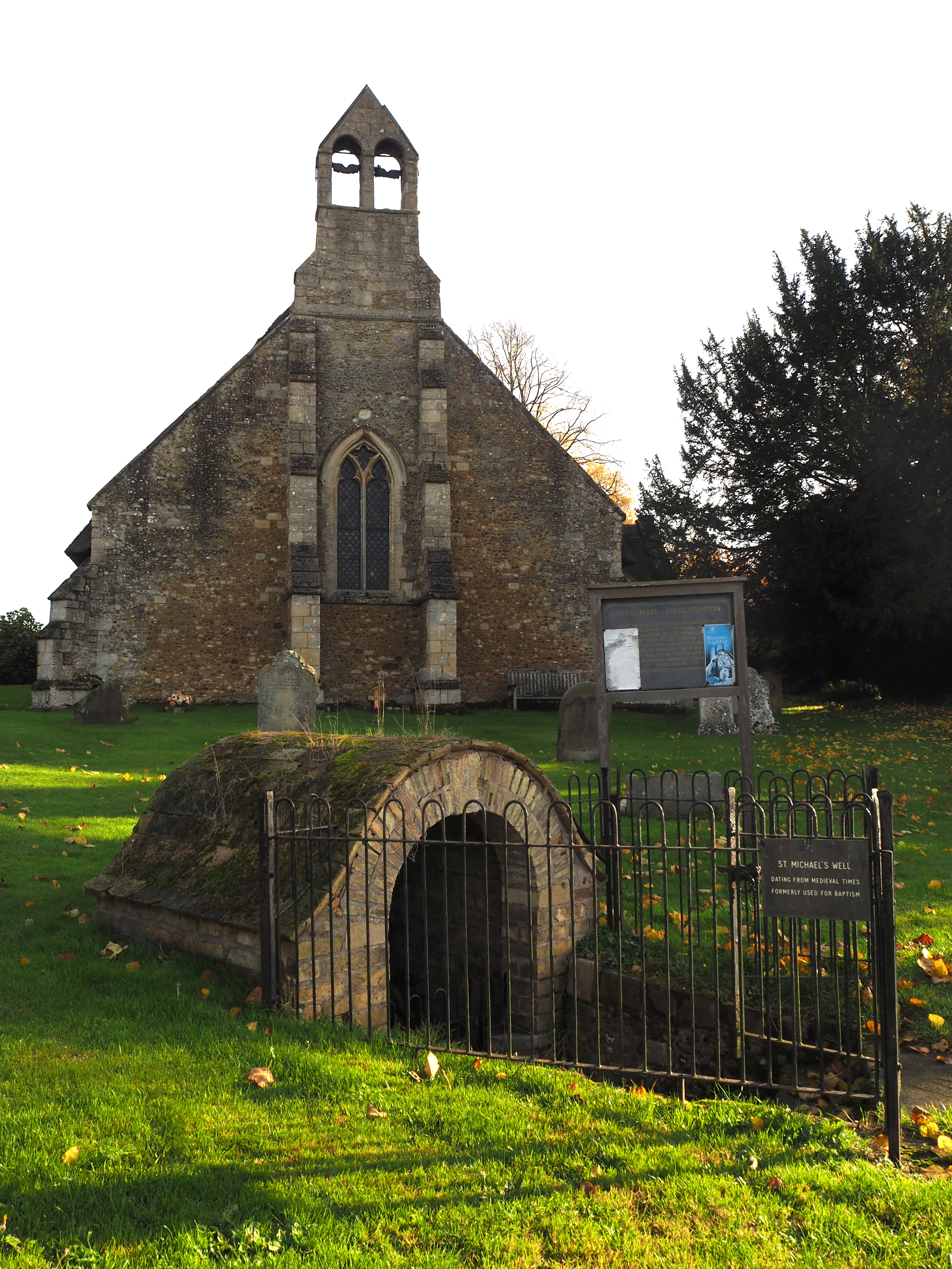
- West end of St Michael's Church, Longstanton, with the holy well in the foreground

- Location in Cambridgeshire
- OS grid reference: TL 403 658
- Location: Longstanton, Cambridgeshire
- Country: England
- Denomination: Anglican
- Website: Churches Conservation Trust

Architecture
- Functional status: Redundant
- Heritage designation: Grade II*
- Designated: 31 August 1962
- Architectural type: Church
- Style: Gothic

Specifications
- Materials: Fieldstones with Barnack limestone dressings Roofs thatched and tiled

St Michael's Church is a redundant Anglican church in the village of Longstanton, Cambridgeshire, England. It is recorded in the National Heritage List for England as a designated Grade II* listed building, and is under the care of the Churches Conservation Trust. The church stands at the south end of the village. The design of St Michael's was used for that of the Church of St. James the Less in Philadelphia, Pennsylvania, as well as St. Thomas Church in New Windsor, New York, both in 1846. It has been influential in the design of other churches in the American Gothic Revival style.

== History ==
Most of the church dates from the early 13th century. The west wall was rebuilt in the 15th century when two large buttresses and a west window were added. The south porch was built in the earlier part of the same century. In the 19th century the chancel was being used as a schoolroom and was screened from the nave by a curtain. The chancel was demolished in 1883 and rebuilt the following year at a cost of £600 (equivalent to £64,000 in 2025). Its details were copied with care from the 13th-century design. In 1889 the nave was restored at a cost of £350 (equivalent to £39,000 in 2025). The parish of St Michael's was united with that of All Saints in 1958. The two bells in the bellcote were stolen in 1969. St Michael's church was declared redundant in 1973 and vested in the Redundant Churches Fund (the forerunners of the Churches Conservation Trust) in 1975. The thatched roof was restored by the Trust in 2000.

== Architecture ==
=== Exterior ===
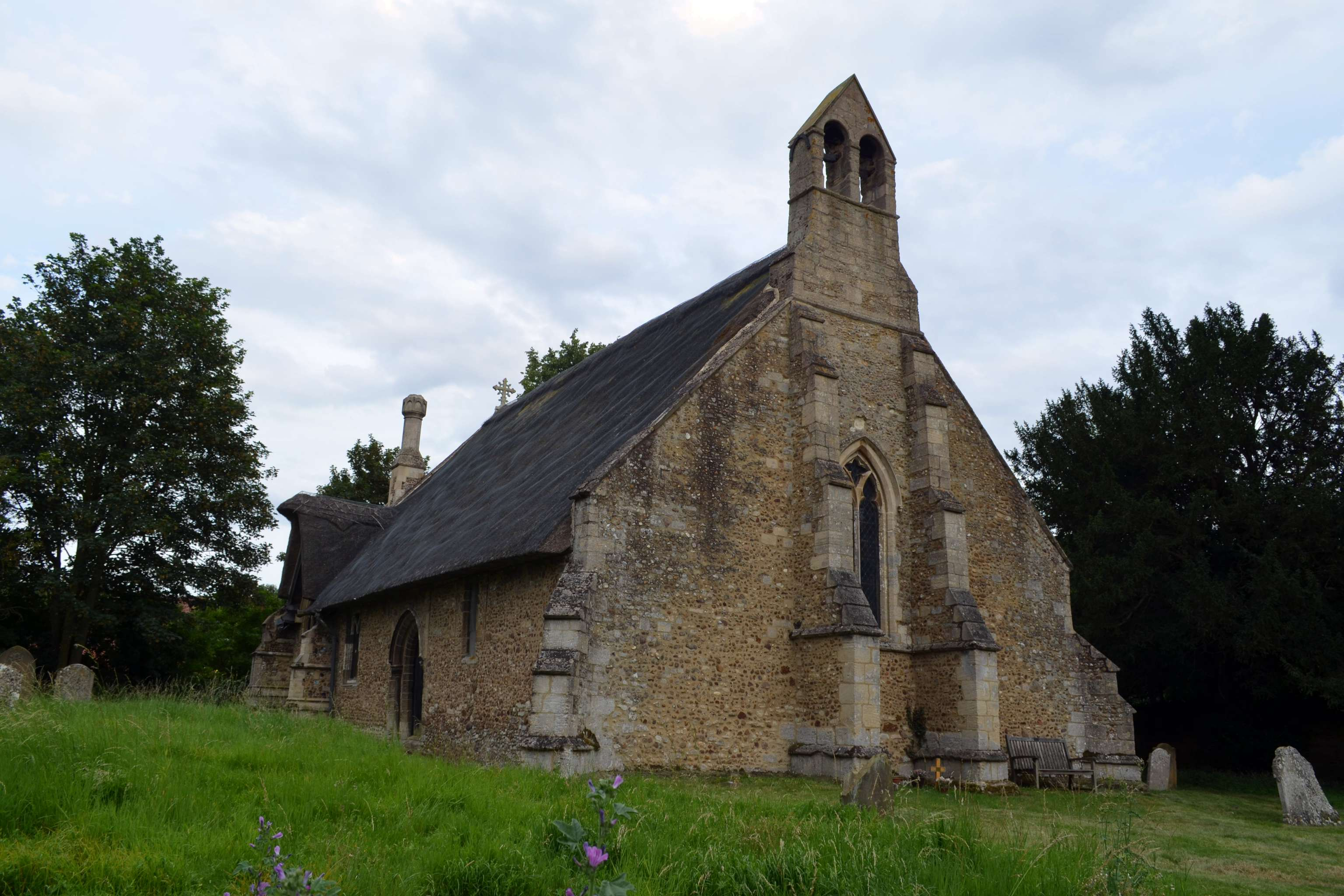
St Michael's Church viewed from the northwest in July 2014

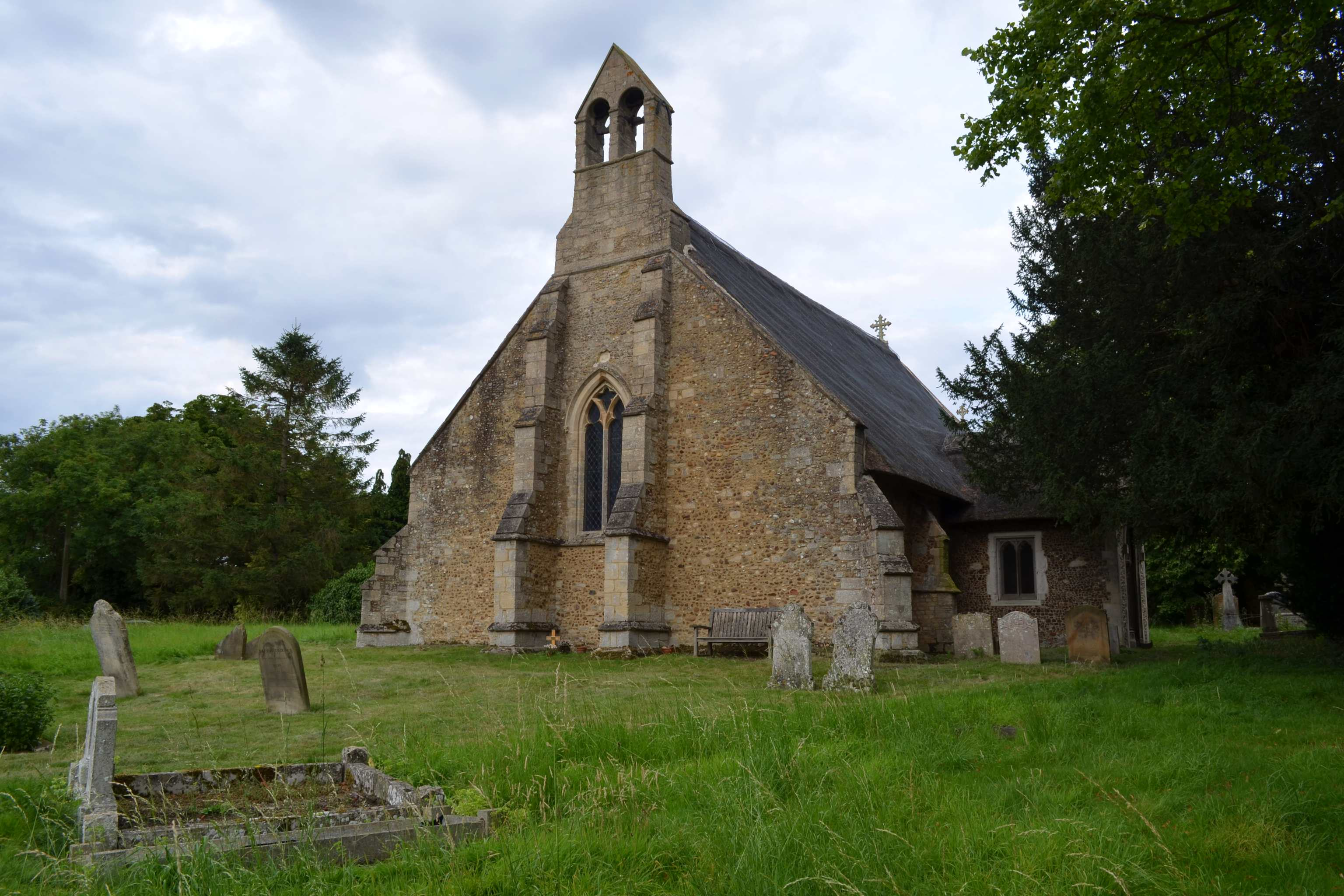
St Michael's Church viewed from the southwest in July 2014

The church is constructed in fieldstone with Barnack limestone dressings. The roofs of the nave and the south porch are covered in reed thatch and the chancel is tiled. It is one of only two thatched churches in Cambridgeshire, the other being in the nearby village of Rampton. The plan consists of a nave with north and south aisles, a south porch, and a chancel. On the west gable is a double bellcote. Against the west wall of the church are two four-stage buttresses between which is a two-light window. The windows elsewhere include three 19th-century lancets that probably replaced earlier similar windows. The north wall contains a doorway, and some ashlar stone suggesting the presence of earlier openings.

=== Interior ===
Inside the church, the arcades date from the 13th century, and are in four bays with arches carried on alternating round and octagonal columns. In the chancel is a double piscina with intersecting arches made from clunch. This said to be similar to the piscina in Jesus College Chapel, Cambridge.

== External features ==
In the churchyard is a holy well. This was restored in the 1980s, and was dressed for the first time in September 1986.
