= Robert Shute =

16th-century English judge and politician

Robert Shute (died April 1590) was an English judge and politician who sat in the House of Commons from 1571 to 1581.

Shute was born at Gargrave, West Riding of Yorkshire, and was the son of Christopher Shute, of Oakington, Cambridgeshire. He was admitted to Peterhouse, Cambridge probably in 1542, or 1544. He was admitted to Gray's Inn in 1550 and was called to the bar in 1552. He was Recorder of Cambridge from 1558 until his death in 1590. He was reader for his Inn in 1568.

In 1571, Shute was elected Member of Parliament for Cambridge. He was re-elected MP for Cambridge in 1572. In 1576 he was treasurer of his Inn. He became a Serjeant-at-law in 1577 and was Baron of the Exchequer from 1579 to 1586. He became a justice of the Queen's Bench in 1586.

Shute married Thomasine Burgoyne, daughter of Christopher Burgoyne, of Longstanton, Cambridgeshire and Thomasine Freville. His son Robert was MP for St Albans. His daughter Jane married John Hatton, also of Longstanton, and had several children, including Sir Thomas Hatton, 1st Baronet and the Royalist politician Sir Robert Hatton.

Parliament of England
Preceded by Henry Serle; Roger Slegge	Member of Parliament for Cambridge; 1571; With: Roger Slegge	Succeeded by Henry North; Roger Slegge
