= Robert Hare (antiquary) =

Member of the Parliament of England

Robert Hare (died 1611) was an English official, antiquary, politician and benefactor of the University of Cambridge.

== Early life ==
The second of the three sons of Sir Nicholas Hare and Catharine, daughter of Sir John Bassingbourn, he matriculated as a fellow-commoner of Gonville Hall, Cambridge, 12 November 1545. He took no degree, and on leaving university was admitted a student of the Inner Temple, on 2 February 1548.

== In office ==
Hare was one of the gentlemen appointed to bear the bannerols at the funeral of Anne of Cleves on 15 July 1555, and on 29 March 1558 he was in the service of William Paulet, 1st Marquess of Winchester. On 14 June 1560 he was admitted clerk of the pells on the nomination of the marquess, and he was returned for Dunwich in Suffolk to the parliament which met on 11 January 1563. In or about 1571 he vacated the clerkship of the pells, Chidioc Wardour occurring as the holder of the office in that year.

== Later life ==
The remainder of Hare's life was mainly spent on documenting the history, rights, and privileges of the university and town of Cambridge. In a list of recusants in London, drawn up in October 1578, his name occurs, and it is stated that he used to hear mass at the house of Lord Paulet. Hare was residing in Norton Folgate at some period between 1581 and 1594. In 1600 he was in some trouble, presumed to be on account of his religion; On 23 January 1601 the Cambridge senate passed a grace that a letter should be written in the name of the university to Sir Robert Cecil, so that Hare might not be hindered in his good works related to the highways.

Hare's brother Michael died on 11 April 1611, and, though he had been twice married, left no issue. Hare therefore inherited an estate at Bruisyard in Suffolk, but survived only till 2 November in that year.

He was buried in Old St Paul's Cathedral in London, but the grave and monument were destroyed in the Great Fire of London in 1666. His name appears on a modern monument in the crypt, listing important graves lost in the fire.

The estates passed to his uncle John, father of Hugh Hare, 1st Baron Coleraine.

== Legacy ==
In 1568 Hare gave to Caius College, Cambridge, a work written on parchment, mainly on Winchester Cathedral, but referring also to the origin of the University of Cambridge. The library of Caius College contained two volumes of his collections; he presented also to the university library two curious ancient manuscripts. To the library of St Paul's Cathedral he presented a manuscript that had belonged to Syon Abbey.

To the library of Trinity Hall, Cambridge, Hare gave books including Thomas de Elmham's History of St. Augustine's, Canterbury; also giving money to a fund for repairing highways around Cambridge. In 1594 he gave to the university a book relating to its privileges, written by Thomas Marhaunt, B.D., early in the fifteenth century. It is thought he was also a benefactor to Great St. Mary's Church, Cambridge, since his arms were over its south door.

== Works ==
Hare's works were left in manuscript:

- A Treatise on Military Discipline, and Rules to be observed in Time of War, written in 1556 (Cotton MS. Jul. F. v.)
- Registrum novum Monimentorum Universitatis Cantabrigiensis, in quo indultorum pontificalium, cartarum regalium, petitionum in parliamento, fundationum et donationum collegiorum, literarum patentium, brevium clausorum, confirmationum, inquisitionum, querelarum, assisarum, processuum, arbitramentorum, compositionarum, et aliorum monimentorum, quæ jura, franchesias, libertates, privilegia, et consuetudines Universitatis prædictæ et Burgi sive Municipii ibidem concernunt, exemplaria ab archivis magno labore extracta et fideliter transcripta continentur, manuscript, 2 vols. in the registry of the university of Cambridge. The first volume is from King John to 23 Ric. II, 1399; the second from Henry IV to 31 Eliz., 1589.
- Liber Privilegiorum Libertatum aliorumque rescriptorum negotia almæ Universitatis Cantabrigiensis concernentium ex archivis regiis variisque registris antiquis et monumentis fide dignis magno labore et sumptu in ordinem per regum seriem collegit et redegit in favorem et commodum tam modernorum quam futurorum venerabilium Cancellarii Magistrorum et Scholarium ejusdem celebratissimæ Universitatis, manuscript, 3 vols. in the registry of the university of Cambridge.
- Liber Privilegiorum et Libertatum almæ Universitatis Cantabrigiensis, 2 vols.; Liber diversorum negotiorum . . . Universitatis Cantabrigiensis ... ad annum 1588; Liber Privilegiorum et Libertatum necnon aliarum rerum memorabilium Villam sive Burgum Cantabr. concernentium. These four volumes went to the registry of the university of Cambridge.
- Liber Privilegiorum Acad. Oxon. and Liber Memorabilium Acad. Oxon.
- Collectanea de academia et villa Cantabrigiæ (Cotton MS. Faust. C. iii.)
- Collectanea de academia et villa Oxoniæ (Cotton MS. Faust. C. vii.)
- Miscellaneæ Collectiones, 2 vols. (manuscripts in Caius College, 391, 392).
- Magnus Annulus (manuscript on parchment, 11 feet 9½ inches by 6¼ inches); among the muniments of Sir Thomas Hare at Stow Bardolph, Norfolk, exhibited to the Society of Antiquaries of London on 20 January 1859. It consists of a table of the Golden Number, Sunday letters, and date of Easter from 1286 to 1817. On the margin are notes of obits.

== Notes ==
Attribution

This article incorporates text from a publication now in the public domain: Stephen, Leslie; Lee, Sidney, eds. (1890). "Hare, Robert". Dictionary of National Biography. Vol. 24. London: Smith, Elder & Co.
