= Deborah Moody =

Landowner in colonial America (1586–c.1659)

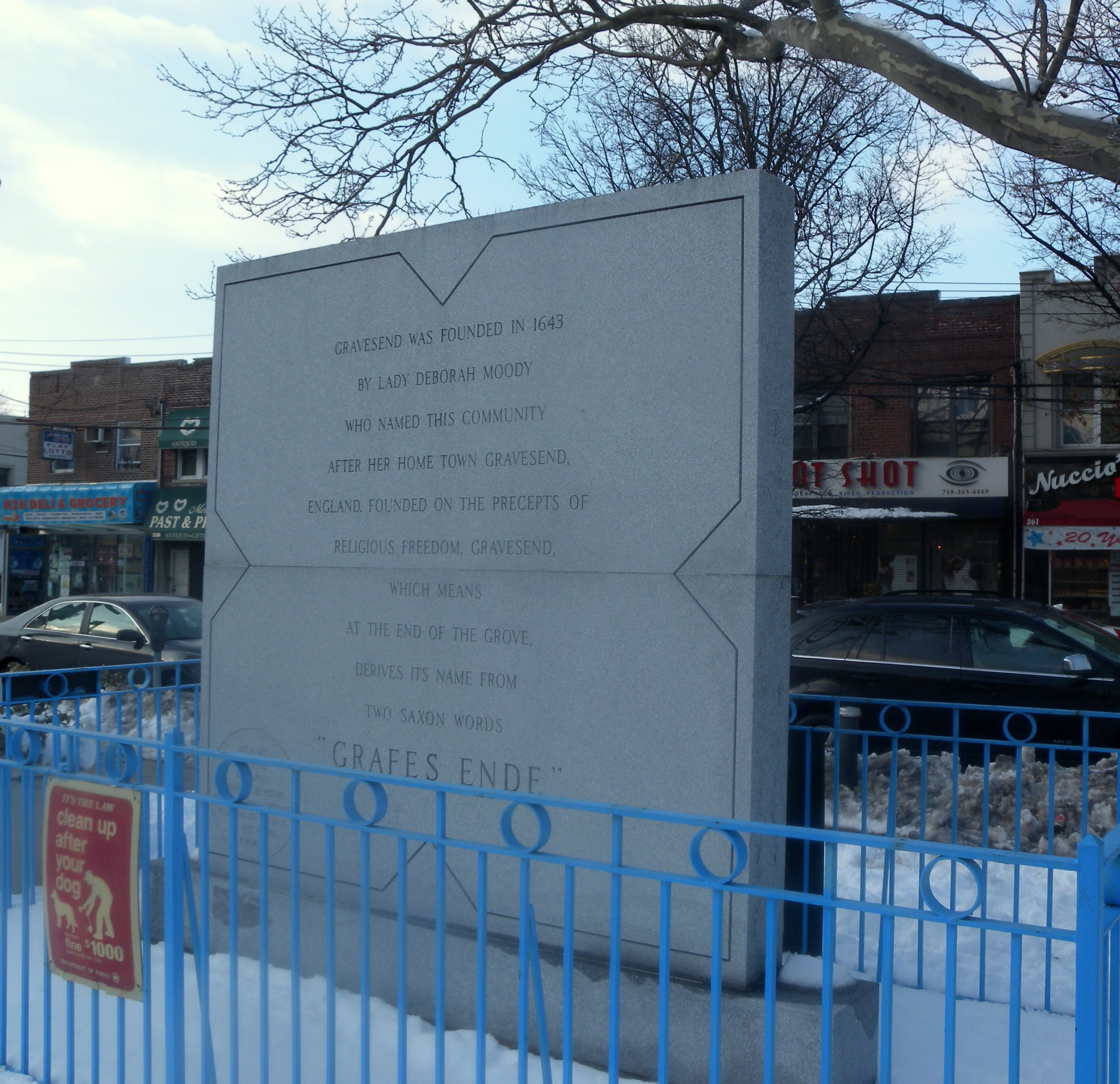
Memorial in Lady Moody Square, Gravesend, Brooklyn

Deborah, Lady Moody (1586– circa 1659) was the founder of Gravesend, Brooklyn, and is the only European woman known to have founded a settlement in North America. She is the first known female landowner in the New World.

She was an influential Nonconformist and Anabaptist, and, in the Massachusetts Bay Colony, was described by contemporaries as "a dangerous woman".

== Family ==
Deborah Dunch was born in London in 1586, the daughter of Walter Dunch of Avebury Manor in Wiltshire and his wife Deborah, daughter of James Pilkington, bishop of Durham and his wife. Walter's father was Sir William Dunch, the auditor of the Royal Mint.

Deborah in 1606 married Sir Henry Moody, 1st Baronet, by whom she had one son, Sir Henry Moody, 2nd Baronet, who after the English Civil War emigrated to join her in the United States, where he died.

G. E. Cokayne incorrectly states that her son the 2nd baronet died without issue. In reality the 2nd baronet had at least one son, Captain John Moody (d. 1673), who emigrated to St Michael, Barbados, where he has a memorial at St. Michael's Cathedral Church, in the cross-walk that runs from the south to the north porch. However, none of the 2nd baronet's sons claimed the English baronetcy, which became extinct on the 2nd baronet's death.

== Historical Importance ==
Deborah, Lady Moody was a Nonconformist and Anabaptist. After her husband's death in 1629, she emigrated to Massachusetts in 1636. She first settled in the town of Saugus, Massachusetts, before she moved to a large farm in Swampscott, just outside of Salem. She corresponded with other religious Nonconformists in the area, and espoused the views of Roger Williams on the invalidity of infant baptism. This attracted adverse attention from her closest neighbor, Reverend Hugh Peter. Peter believed in religious unity in the Massachusetts Puritan colony. He had already expelled Anne Hutchinson, another Anabaptist woman, two years prior to Moody's arrival. In 1643, Moody was put on trial for allegedly spreading religious dissent. Puritan leader John Endecott described her as a "dangerous woman", during her trial. The Church told her to change her beliefs or be excommunicated.

Moody chose excommunication. She gathered her fellow Anabaptists and set out once again to find a place where they could peacefully practice their religion. In 1643, Director Willem Kieft of the Dutch West India Company was looking for new settlers to add to the population in New Netherland. He had recently started a war with the local Lenape and wanted more settlers to defend the newly seized land. Lady Moody had money and followers, and accepted the opportunity to create a new community.

Since the Netherlands and their colonies had policies of relative religious tolerance, in order to encourage trade, Moody's Anabaptist beliefs presented less of a problem. The Dutch West India Company entrusted Moody with the southwestern tip of Long Island. This includes the areas now known as parts of Bensonhurst, Coney Island, Brighton Beach, and Sheepshead Bay. Moody named her new community Gravesend. Gravesend was the first New World settlement founded by a woman. Moody allowed total religious freedom in Gravesend, as long as it fell within the laws of the colony.

As Gravesend prospered, Moody gained influence in the government of New Netherland. She was among the few prominent settlers invited to greet the new Director-General, Peter Stuyvesant, when he arrived in 1647. Stuyvesant called on her to mediate a tax dispute in 1654. In 1655, she was called upon to nominate magistrates for Gravesend. Moody lived in Gravesend until her death in 1659.

== Legacy ==
Gravesend is now part of Brooklyn in New York City, with the original town square still evident in the street layout.

In the fall of 2014, Moody was honored for founding the town of Gravesend in "Built by Women New York City", a competition launched by the Beverly Willis Architecture Foundation. It identified outstanding and diverse sites and spaces designed, engineered and built by women. A memorial was erected to her at Lady Moody Triangle, named in her honor in Gravesend.
