= Hatton baronets =

Extinct baronetcy in the Baronetage of England

The Hatton Baronetcy, of Long Stanton in the County of Cambridge, was a title in the Baronetage of England. It was created on 5 July 1641 for Thomas Hatton, member of parliament for Corfe Castle, Malmesbury and Stamford. Thomas Hatton was also the first cousin once removed to Sir Christopher Hatton, Lord Chancellor. Thomas was the elder brother of Christopher Hatton (later designated heir to Sir Christopher Hatton of Kirby), whose descendants later became Viscount Hatton. The baronetcy became extinct on the death of the 10th Baronet in 1812. The Hatton of Long Stanton fortune and estate was then partially inherited by their distant cousin, the Hon. Rev. Daniel Heneage Finch-Hatton, second son of George Finch-Hatton (descendants of Viscount Hatton).

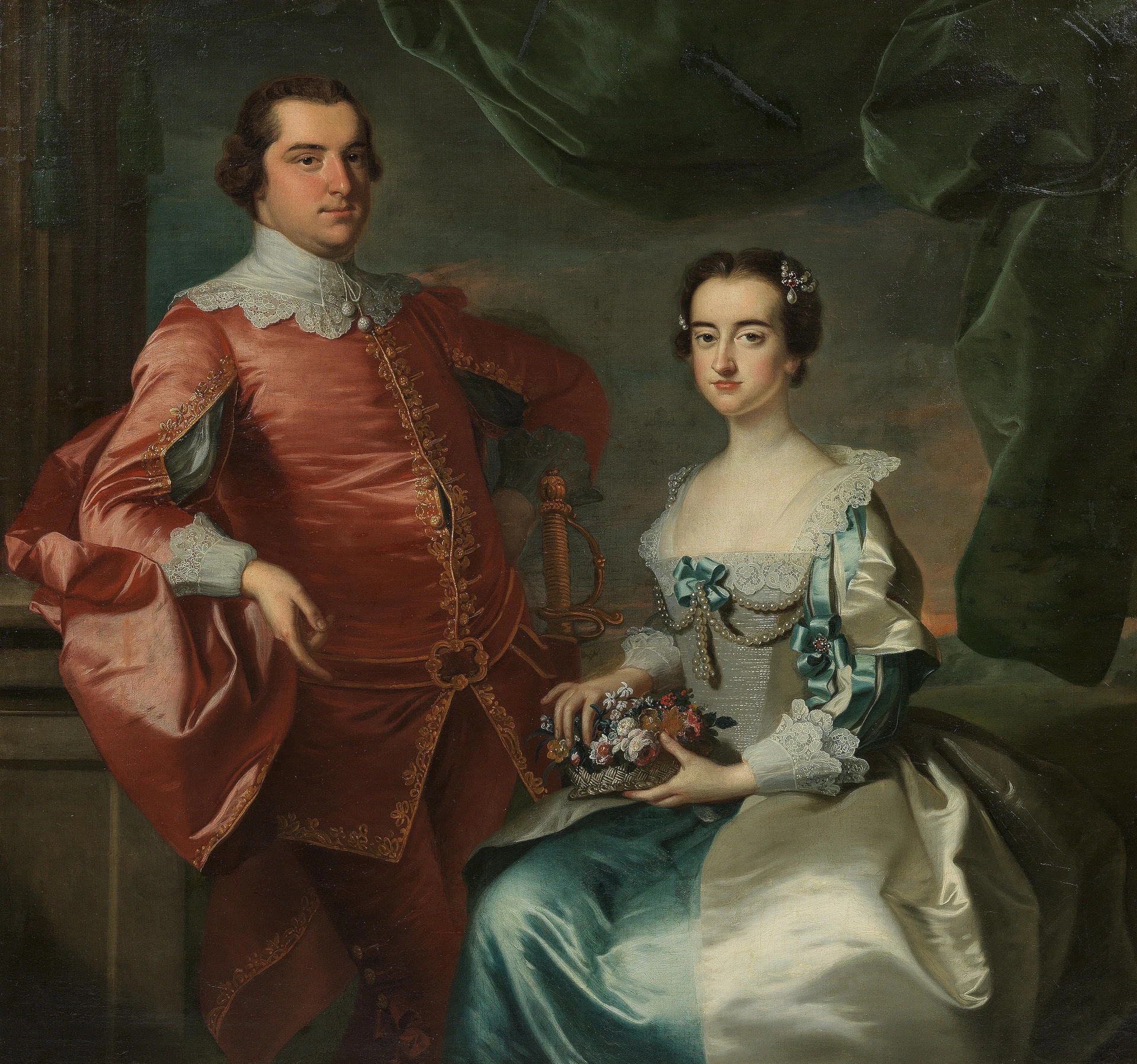
Sir Thomas Hatton, 8th Baronet of Long Stanton and Lady Hatton by Thomas Hudson. Parents to the 9th and 10th Baronets.

== Hatton baronets, of Long Stanton (1641) ==
- Sir Thomas Hatton, 1st Baronet (c. 1583–1658), brother of Sir Christopher Hatton (ancestors of Viscount Hatton)
- Sir Thomas Hatton, 2nd Baronet (died 1682)
- Sir Christopher Hatton, 3rd Baronet (died 1683)
- Sir Thomas Hatton, 4th Baronet (died 1685)
- Sir Christopher Hatton, 5th Baronet (died 1720)
- Sir Thomas Hatton, 6th Baronet (died 1733)
- Sir John Hatton, 7th Baronet (died 1740)
- Sir Thomas Hatton, 8th Baronet (1728–1787)
- Sir John Hatton, 9th Baronet (c. 1758–1811)
- Sir Thomas Dingley Hatton, 10th Baronet (c. 1771–1812) the baronetcy went extinct, he left the family estate to his sisters, they then left it to the Hon. Rev. Daniel Heneage Finch-Hatton

== See also ==
- Viscount Hatton
