= Viscount Hatton =

Viscount Hatton, of Grendon, was a title in the Peerage of England. It was created in 1683 for Christopher Hatton, 2nd Baron Hatton. He was the son of the prominent Royalist Christopher Hatton, who was created Baron Hatton, of Kirby, in the Peerage of England in 1643. He was a relation and heir of Sir Christopher Hatton, Lord Chancellor under Queen Elizabeth I. The first Viscount was succeeded by his eldest son, the second Viscount. On his death the titles passed to his younger brother, the third Viscount. When he died in 1762 the titles became extinct.

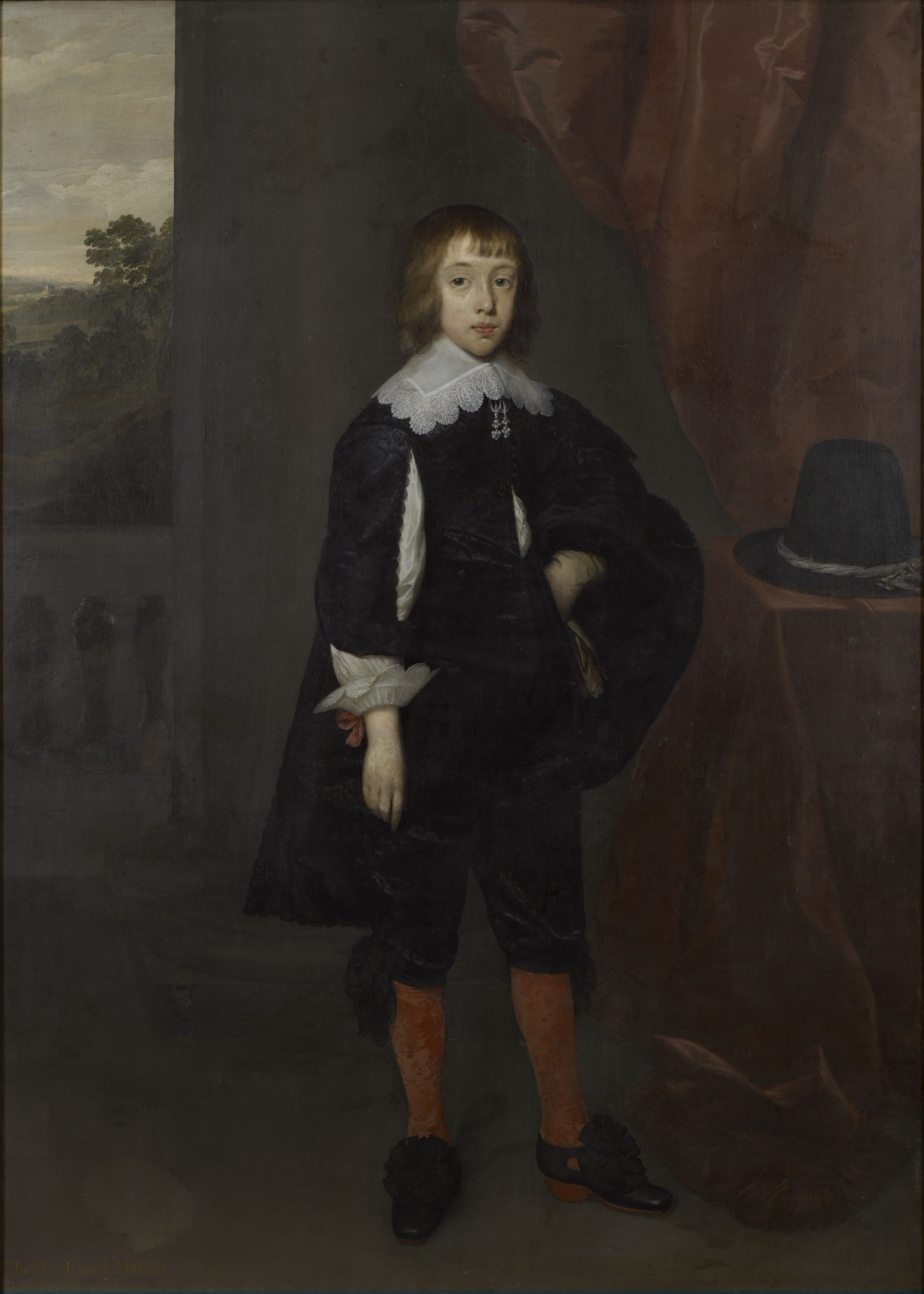
Portrait of Christopher Hatton, 1st Viscount Hatton (circa 1632-1706)

The Hon. Anne Hatton, daughter of the first Viscount, married Daniel Finch, 7th Earl of Winchilsea and 2nd Earl of Nottingham. His grandson George Finch assumed the additional surname of Hatton and the Earls of Winchilsea and Nottingham are now the representatives of the Hatton family.

== Barons Hatton (1643) ==
- Christopher Hatton, 1st Baron Hatton (1605–1670)
- Christopher Hatton, 2nd Baron Hatton (1632–1706)

== Viscounts Hatton (1683) ==
- Christopher Hatton, 1st Viscount Hatton (1632–1706)
- William Seton Hatton, 2nd Viscount Hatton (1690–1760)
- Henry Charles Hatton, 3rd Viscount Hatton (c. 1700–1762)

== See also ==
- Hatton Baronets
