= Longstanton =

Village in Cambridgeshire, England

Coordinates: 52.279°N 0.0478°E

- Location within Cambridgeshire
- Population: 3,286 (2021 census)
- OS grid reference: TL397665
  - London: 53 miles (85 km)
- District: South Cambridgeshire
- Shire county: Cambridgeshire
- Region: East
- Country: England
- Sovereign state: United Kingdom
- Post town: Cambridge
- Postcode district: CB24
- Dialling code: 01954
- Police: Cambridgeshire
- Fire: Cambridgeshire
- Ambulance: East of England
- UK Parliament: St Neots and Mid Cambridgeshire

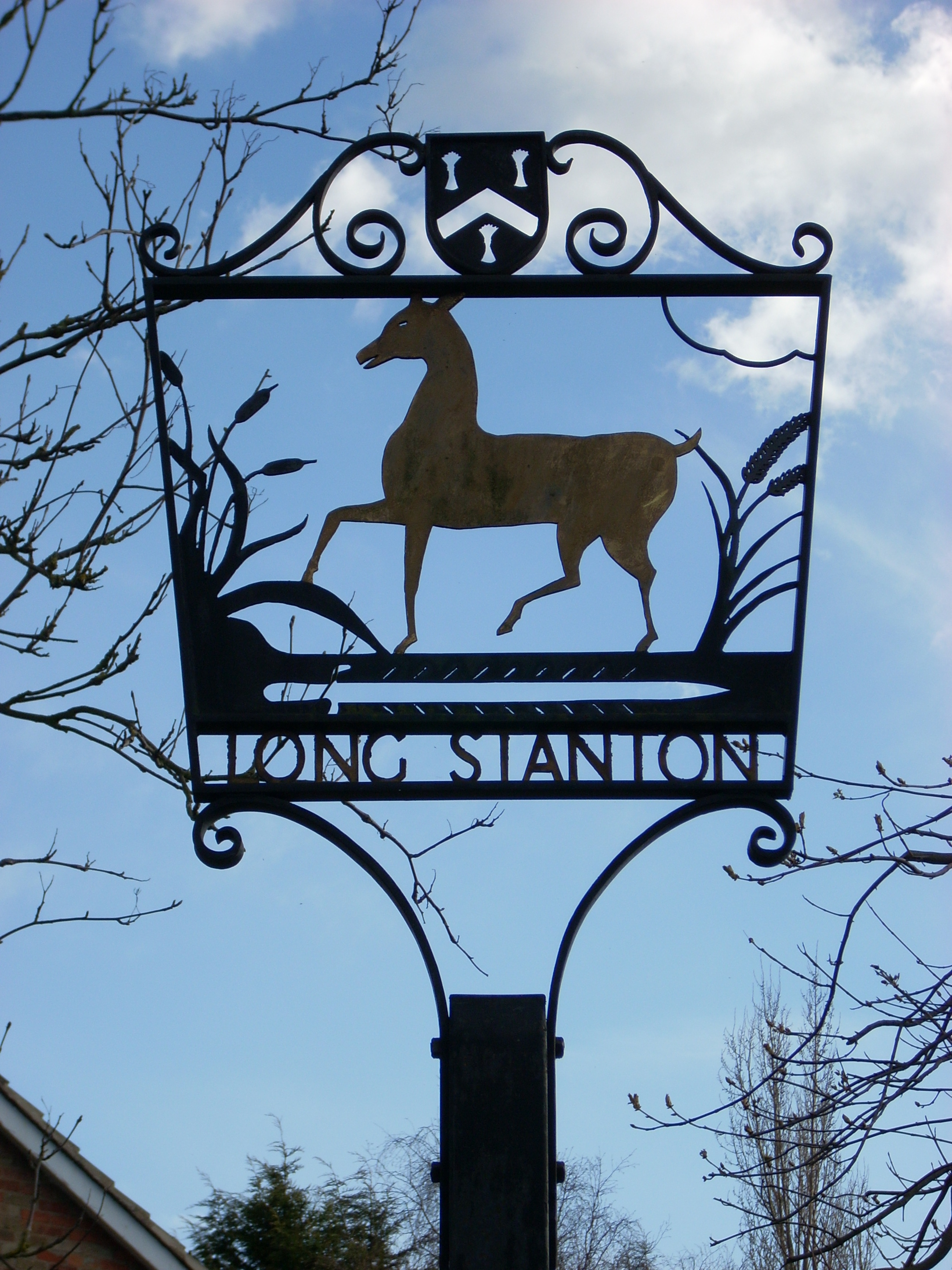
Village sign of Longstanton erected in 1981 to mark the marriage of the Prince of Wales. The sign is of the golden hind and the coat of arms of the Hatton family.

Longstanton is a village and civil parish in South Cambridgeshire, England, 6 miles (9.7 km) north-west of Cambridge city centre. Longstanton occupies 2,775 acres (1,123 ha). Longstanton was created in 1953 from the two parishes of Long Stanton All Saints and Long Stanton St Michael. While the village is called Longstanton, the alternative form Long Stanton is still in use, for example when referring to the separate pre-1953 parishes, or to the current ecclesiastical parish.

== History ==
For most of its history Longstanton was split into two parishes: the larger Long Stanton All Saints to the north and the smaller Long Stanton St. Michael to the south. The two may have been seen as distinct by 1086, when the Domesday Book referred to a "Stantone" and a "Stantune", and were certainly so by 1240, distinguished in Liber Memorandorum Ecclesie de Bernewelle as "Stanton" and "the other Stanton". The two villages were not formally amalgamated until 1953 and the two church parishes were permanently united in 1959.

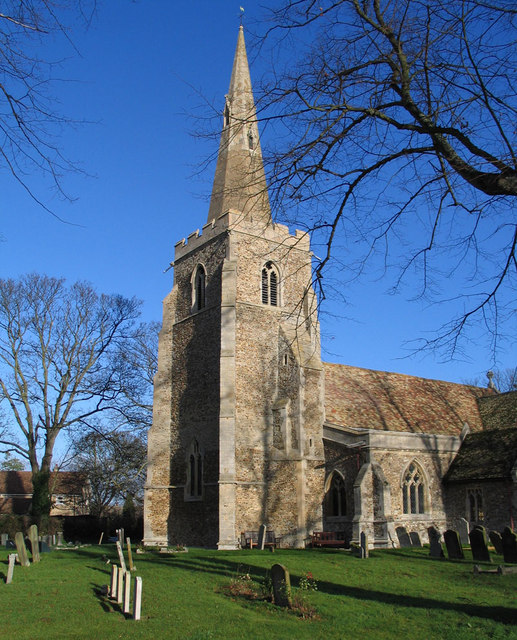
All Saints' Church, Longstanton

The first known reference to the village, dating back to 1070 AD, calls the village "Stantona", meaning "an enclosed settlement of stoney ground." By the time of the Domesday Book "Stantone" was one of the most populous villages in the area, with 67 peasant tenants being recorded. By 1563 this had dwindled to 42 families, and the settlement had been overtaken in size by other nearby villages such as Chesterton. The population fluctuated between 400 and 600 for several centuries; in the 1901 census there were 340 inhabitants of Longstanton All Saints parish and 93 inhabitants of Longstanton St Michael's parish (population of Longstanton was 443).

=== Hatton family ===
The Hatton family dominated Longstanton as largest landowner and resident squires until the early 19th century. Sir Christopher and his mother Alice in 1633 sold their manors, named as Long Stanton, Cheyneys, Walwyns, and Colvilles, to his uncle Thomas Hatton, 1st baronet. The estate descended with the Hatton baronetcy. Title and estates were inherited by Thomas Dingley Hatton, who succeeded to the baronetcy in 1811 and died in 1812, when the title became extinct. At inclosure in 1816 the Long Stanton estate was owned jointly by his six sisters, being divided shortly afterwards among three who were unmarried, Frances, Elizabeth Ann, and Anne, who received 888 a., 550 a., and 318 a. respectively. By will proved 1838 Frances left most of her share to Anne for life, with remainder to their distant relative Rev. Daniel Heneage Finch-Hatton, chaplain to Queen Victoria. Under Anne's will, proved 1842, her enlarged estate was settled on Elizabeth Ann for life, and it was only under Elizabeth Ann's will, proved 1845, that Daniel Finch-Hatton obtained possession. He was succeeded after his death in 1866 by his son Edward Hatton Finch-Hatton, who dispersed the land by sale in 1874 but appears to have retained the manorial rights until he died in 1887. His brother and heir William Robert Finch-Hatton (d. 1909) was followed by his eldest son George Daniel, after whose death in 1921.

The three open fields of Longstanton All Saints and of Longstanton St Michael's were inclosed in 1816.

=== Village sign ===
The village sign of Longstanton erected in 1981 to mark the marriage of the Prince of Wales, features a golden hind, from the crest of the Hatton's, on top was the coat of arms of the Hatton.

The name of Sir Francis Drake's ship, in which he sailed around the world, was changed from 'Pelican' to the 'Golden Hind' in recognition of the patronage of Sir Christopher Hatton, Lord Chancellor to Queen Elizabeth I, who was first cousin to John Hatton of Longstanton, Lord of the Manor of All Saints. John eldest son's Sir Thomas Hatton had a 22 acre park in the parish of All Saints surrounding his manor house, Hatton Park.

The village was transformed by the opening of RAF Oakington in 1940, resulting in the building of three new housing estates in the village and a trebling of the population. Although the airfield was in Oakington, all of the hangars, housing and other buildings were in Longstanton. Two bomber squadrons operated from RAF Oakington for the rest of the Second World War. There was also a photographic reconnaissance unit and a meteorological unit for a time during the war. Following the end of the war, the airfield was used by transport squadrons until 1950 and then by air training schools. The cemetery at the church of Longstanton All Saints contains a number of graves of servicemen who died either during or after the war. The graves are tended by the Commonwealth War Graves Commission.

After 1946 the older pupils went to schools elsewhere but the growth of the village soon outpaced the accommodation available. New buildings, called Hatton Park School, were opened in 1954 on the site of the Hattons' manor house.

The site became an army barracks in 1975 and on its closure in 1999 most of the housing was sold to private owners. The barracks buildings were used from 2000 to 2010 as an Immigration Reception Centre by the Home Office.

== Government ==
Longstanton has its own civil parish council with eleven parish councillors. Longstanton is represented on South Cambridgeshire District Council by two councillors and on Cambridgeshire County Council by one councillor for the Longstanton, Northstowe and Over electoral division. Longstanton is in the parliamentary constituency of St Neots & Mid Cambridgeshire, represented in the House of Commons since 2024 by Ian Sollom.

== Geography ==
The village itself lies on a low gravel ridge (approximately 10 metres (33 ft) to 14 metres (46 ft) above mean sea level) but most of the parish lies on West Walton formation and Amptill Clay formation mudstone.

Longstanton is immediately adjacent to the new town of Northstowe, which is planned to contain 10,000 homes and have a population of 26,000. The new town was proposed c. 2003, and will be built on land to the north and east of Longstanton (including the former RAF Oakington site). In 2012 outline planning consent was granted for the first phase of 1,500 houses, a new primary school and some local road improvements. The work to build a new primary school started in 2015. In 2021 a new civil parish of Northstowe was created from part of Longstanton and part of Oakington and Weswick; it is envisaged that the Longstanton, Oakington, and Northstowe will remain separate parishes even when the new town is complete.

== Demography ==
The population of the village was recorded at 1,700 living in 772 households in the 2001 census. The development of new housing at Home Farm started circa 2005 and the population had increased to 2,657 in 1,095 households in the 2011 census. In the census of 2011, 92.4% of people described themselves as white, 2.0% as having mixed or multiple ethnic groups, 4.6% as being Asian or British Asian, and 1.0% as having another ethnicity. In that same census, 55.6% described themselves as Christian, 33.7% described themselves as having no religion, 6.5% did not specify a religion, 1.9% described themselves as Muslim, and 2.3% described themselves as having another religion.

=== Historical population ===
Title	1801	1811	1821	1831	1841	1851	1881	1891	1901	1911	1921	1931	1951	2001	2011	2021
Long Stanton All Saints	296	295	370	428	409	463	410	376	340	331	348	336	678	-	-	
Long Stanton St Michael's	104	123	134	127	139	171	73	78	93	81	79	80	803	-	-	
Longstanton	400	418	504	555	548	634	483	454	433	412	427	416	1,481	1,700	2,657	3,286

Census: Long Stanton All Saints 1801–1951, Census: Long Stanton St Michael 1801–1951, Census: Longstanton 2001–2011

== Culture and community ==
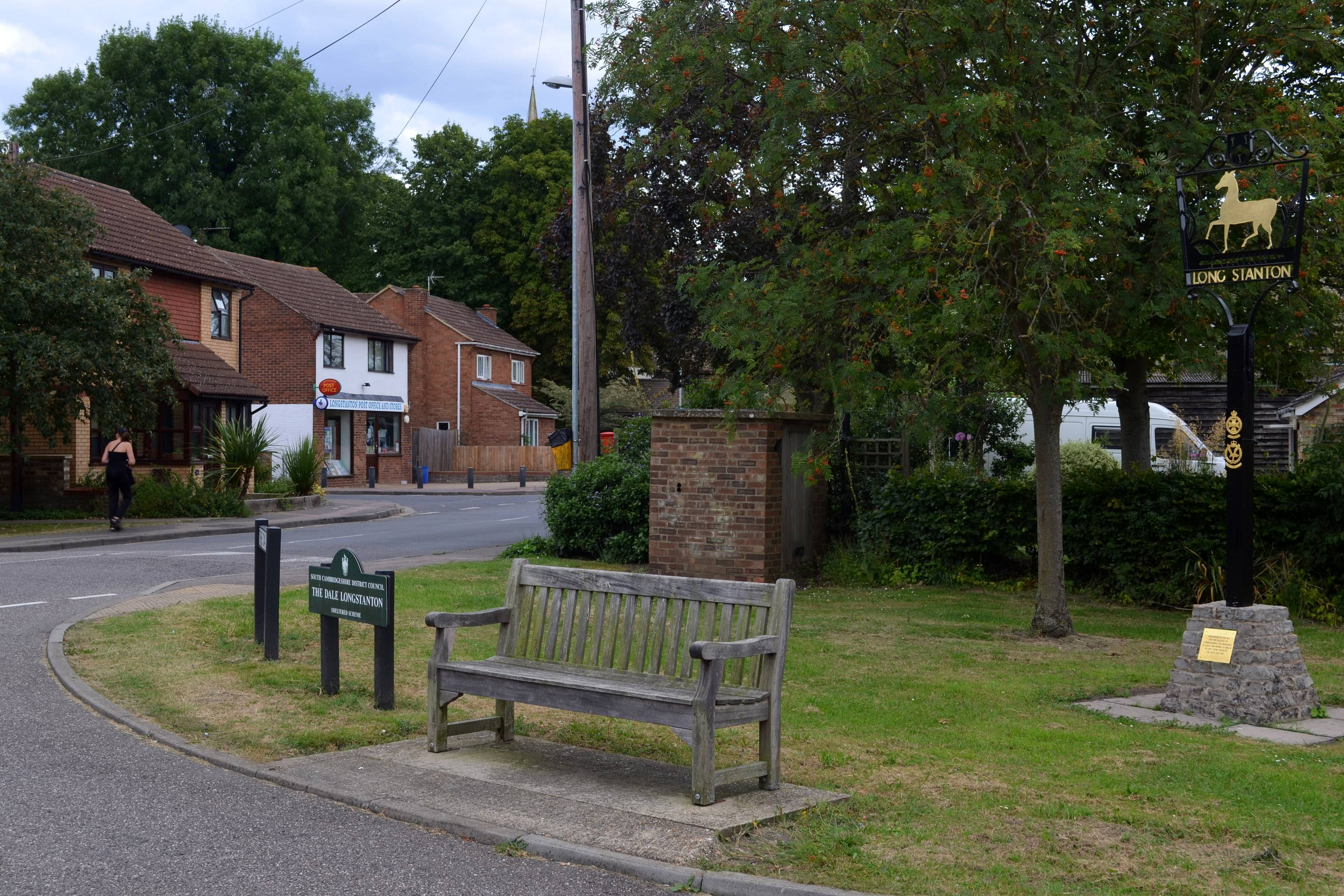
Post office and village sign in July 2014

Longstanton has a Village Institute (built in 1926) and a small number of shops and businesses, including a local supermarket that was opened in 2014 and a post office. There is a medical practice, dental practice and two veterinary practices. The recreation ground has facilities for football, cricket, and tennis. The bowls club was formed in 1985 at which time the bowls green was constructed. There is also a children's play area that was re-fitted with new equipment in 2015. Longstanton is on the route of the Pathfinder March and approximately 300 walkers and runners take part each year in an event to commemorate the work of the Pathfinder reconnaissance squadrons, some of whom were based at RAF Oakington.

The village contains one public house, the Black Bull, which is over 300 years old. A number of public houses in the village have closed including King William IV, Railway Tavern, The Red Cow (closed 1908) and The Hoops (closed in 1983).

=== Cultural references ===
Long Stanton station was immortalised in the Flanders and Swann song "Slow Train". A fictional Longstanton Spice Museum is mentioned in the British comedy series I'm Alan Partridge.

== Education ==
The village has a primary school and is in the catchment area for Northstowe Secondary College, and Swavesey Village College.

== Transport ==
Long Stanton railway station on the Cambridge and Huntingdon line operated between 1847 and 1970. Despite surviving the Beeching Axe, passenger services to Long Stanton were ended in 1970. The route of the railway was developed as the Cambridgeshire Guided Busway, the world's longest guided busway. The busway opened in August 2011 and there is a stop with a park-and-ride car park at Longstanton close to the site of the old railway station. There are frequent daily services from Longstanton to Cambridge and St Ives along the busway. A bus service links Longstanton and surrounding villages with Cambridge.

A by-pass on the B1050 around the northern and western sides of Longstanton was opened in 2008. The A14 trunk road forms the south west boundary of the parish of Longstanton

Regional cycling route 24 and national cycling route 51 both pass through Longstanton. Longstanton is on the route of the long-distance, 46 miles (74 km), Pathfinder Long Distance Walk.

== Religious sites ==
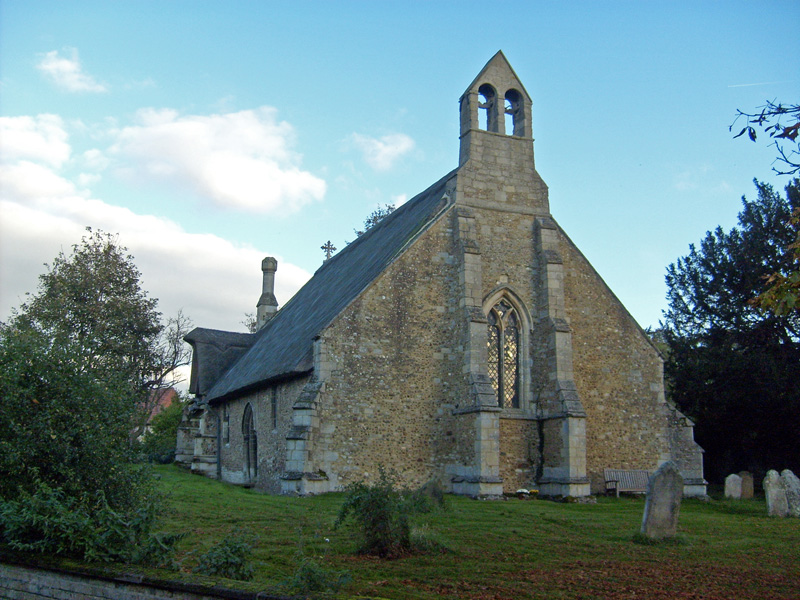
The disused St Michael's Church, to the south of the village

Longstanton is unusual among English villages in having two mediaeval churches - a reminder of its history as two parishes. The larger of the two churches, All Saints Church, is in the centre of the modern village and dates from the mid-14th Century, when it replaced an earlier church which was destroyed by a fire. It closed in 2003 due to a collapse of the ceiling, but reopened in 2007 after £10,000 was raised for repairs. It is a Grade I listed building.

St Michael's Church, situated towards the south of the village, is the smaller and older of the two churches, having been built around 1230. It is notable as a rare example of a church with a thatched roof (one of only two surviving in Cambridgeshire), and is a Grade II* listed building. It has not been used for regular worship since the amalgamation of the parishes, and is now maintained by the Churches Conservation Trust. Churches modelled after its architecture have been built as far away as Philadelphia (see Church of St. James the Less) and South Dakota.

A Wesleyan chapel was built in 1826 for the Cambridge circuit and later joined the Cottenham circuit in 1877, rejoining the Cambridge circuit in 1952. The chapel, which is located on Over Road, closed in 1970.
