= Roger Stott =

British Labour Party politician

Roger Stott CBE

Member of Parliament
- In office 24 May 1973 – 8 August 1999
- Preceded by: Tom Price
- Succeeded by: Neil Turner
- Constituency: Westhoughton (1973–1983); Wigan (1983–1999)

Personal details
- Born: 7 August 1943 Rochdale, Lancashire, England
- Died: 8 August 1999 (aged 56) Wigan, Greater Manchester, England
- Resting place: Donegal, Ireland
- Party: Labour
- Spouse(s): Irene Mills (m. 1969; div. 1982); Gillian Pye (m. 1985; sep. 1997)
- Children: 4, including Joe Mills
- Occupation: Politician

Roger Stott, CBE (7 August 1943 – 8 August 1999) was a British Labour Party politician.

== Biography ==
Stott was born in Rochdale, the first child of Richard and Edith Stott. He was of Scottish descent. He went to school in Rochdale and when he was 15 he joined the Merchant Navy. He was educated at Ruskin College, Oxford. He worked as an engineer for the Post Office and became local councillor for the Labour Party in Rochdale, where he was the Chair of the Housing Committee. He married Irene Mills in 1969, and had two sons. The marriage ended in 1982 and he married again for a second time to a teacher Gillian Pye on 30 March 1985; they had two children. When Stott was not working, he loved to play sport, he was a great rugby league fan and went to watch it whenever he had the chance. He was also a great fan of cricket.

== Political career ==
Stott represented the North West Region on the National Committee of the Labour Party Young Socialists in 1969, following Peter Kent. He contested Cheadle in 1970, coming third.

Stott was first elected to the House of Commons as member of parliament (MP) for Westhoughton at a by-election in 1973, following the death of the sitting Labour MP Tom Price. He was sponsored by the Post Office Engineering Union (POEU). He held that seat at three subsequent general elections before the constituency was abolished for the 1983 general election.

He was then elected MP for the Wigan constituency in Greater Manchester, and held that seat at the next three general elections. His death in office in 1999 made him the fourth Wigan MP in the twentieth century to die in office (the others being John Parkinson, Ronald Williams and William Foster).

Stott was a longtime joint chairman of the Council for the Advancement of Arab-British Understanding, and served as Parliamentary Private Secretary to James Callaghan during his administration. He later served as a junior opposition spokesman.

== Death ==
Stott died in hospital in Wigan from cancer on the evening of 8 August 1999, at the age of 56. He had been ill for some time. After his death many people, including Ian McCartney and Jack Cunningham, wrote tributes to him and the work he had done while he was MP.

Parliament of the United Kingdom
Preceded by Tom Price	Member of Parliament for Westhoughton; 1973–1983	Constituency abolished
Preceded by Alan Fitch	Member of Parliament for Wigan; 1983–1999	Succeeded by Neil Turner
