= William Gerard (disambiguation) =

Sir William Gerard (1518–1581) was an Elizabethan statesman.

William Gerard may also refer to:

- William Gerard (MP for Wareham) (fl. 1414–1421), English Member of Parliament for Wareham
- William Gerard (died 1584) (1520–1584), English Member of Parliament for Preston, and for Wigan
- William Gerard (died 1609), English Member of Parliament for Wigan
- William Gerard, 2nd Baron Gerard (1851–1902), British Army officer and nobleman
- William Tyrer Gerrard (1831–1866), botanist and plant collector
