= 1999 Wigan by-election =

UK parliamentary by-election

- 23 September 1999
- Turnout: 25%
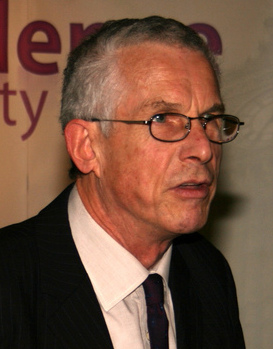
	First party	Second party
Candidate	Neil Turner	Tom Peet
Party	Labour	Conservative
Popular vote	9,641	2,912
Percentage	59.6%	18.0%
Swing	▼9.0pp	▲1.1pp
	Third party	Fourth party
Candidate	Jonathan Rule	John Whittaker
Party	Liberal Democrats	UKIP
Popular vote	2,148	834
Percentage	13.3%	5.2%
Swing	▲3.3pp	New
MP before election
Roger Stott
Labour
Elected MP
Neil Turner
Labour

A by-election for the United Kingdom parliamentary constituency of Wigan was held on 23 September 1999 following the death of incumbent Labour Party MP Roger Stott. Neil Turner, who had been a local Labour councillor for 27 years, held the seat for the party.

The by-election was contested by nine candidates in total. The Conservatives chose Tom Peet, who was an active Trade Unionist and had worked at a nearby coal mine.

The result was a win for the Labour Party, with Turner gaining 59.6% of the vote, in spite of a 5% swing to the Conservative Party.

== Result of the by-election ==
Wigan by-election, 1999
Party	Candidate	Votes	%	±%
Labour	Neil Turner	9,641	59.6	▼9.0
Conservative	Tom Peet	2,912	18.0	▲1.1
Liberal Democrats	Jonathan Rule	2,148	13.3	▲3.3
UKIP	John Whittaker	834	5.2	New
Socialist Labour	William Kelly	240	1.5	New
Green	Chris Maile	190	1.2	▲0.2
National Democrats	Stephen Ebbs	100	0.6	New
Natural Law	Paul Davis	64	0.4	▲0.2
Independent	David Braid	58	0.4	New
Majority		6,729	41.6	▼10.1
Turnout		16,187	25.0	▼42.7
Labour hold		Swing	▼5.0	

== Result of the previous general election ==
General election 1997: Wigan
Party	Candidate	Votes	%	±%
Labour	Roger Stott	30,043	68.6	▲5.6
Conservative	Mark A. Loveday	7,400	16.9	▼6.7
Liberal Democrats	Trevor R. Beswick	4,390	10.0	▼1.0
Referendum	Anthony Bradborne	1,450	3.3	New
Green	Christopher Maile	442	1.0	New
Natural Law	William J. Ayliffe	94	0.2	▼0.2
Majority		22,643	51.7	▲12.3
Turnout		43,819	67.7	▼8.5
Labour hold		Swing	▲6.2	
