= Peter Greenall =

Peter Greenall may refer to:

- Peter Greenall (politician) (1796–1845), British brewer and politician
- Peter Greenall, 4th Baron Daresbury (born 1953), British aristocrat and businessman associated primarily with horseracing
