= Charles Strickland Standish =

British Whig politician (1790–1863)

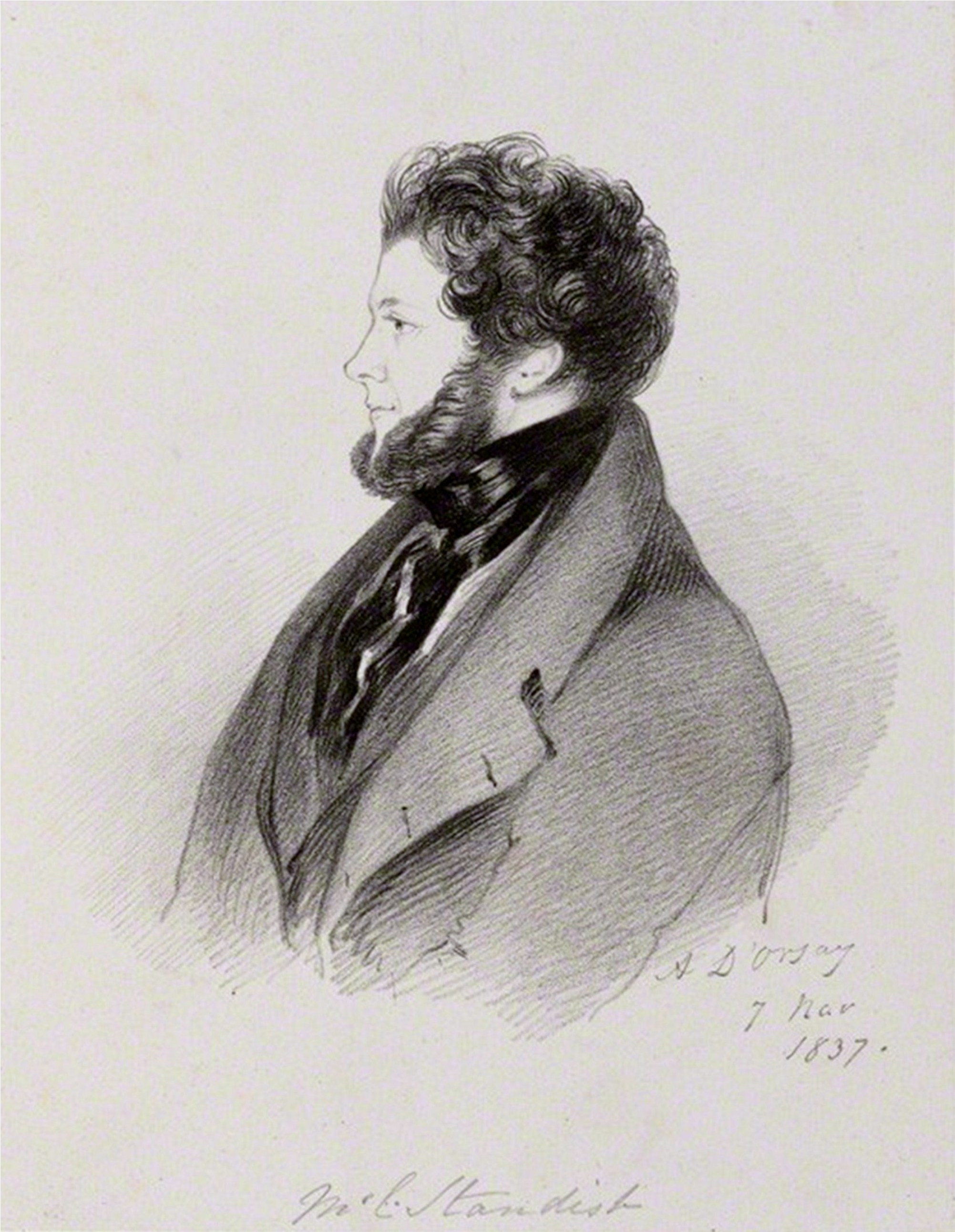
- Portrait of Charles Standish by Richard James Lane

Member of Parliament for Wigan
- In office 11 April 1842 – 28 July 1847 Serving with James Alexander Lindsay (1845–1847); Peter Greenall (1841–1845)
- Preceded by: Peter Greenall; Thomas Bright Crosse
- Succeeded by: James Alexander Lindsay; Ralph Anthony Thicknesse
- In office 25 July 1837 – 1 July 1841 Serving with William Ewart (1839–1841); Richard Potter (1837–1839)
- Preceded by: Richard Potter; John Hodson Kearsley
- Succeeded by: Peter Greenall; Thomas Bright Crosse

Personal details
- Born: March 1790 Strickland, Westmorland
- Died: 10 June 1863 (aged 73) Marylebone, London
- Party: Whig
- Spouse: Emmeline Conradine de Mathiesen (1801–1831)
- Children: Charles Henry Lionel Widdrington Standish (1823–1883), Charles Frederick Standish (1824–1883) Frederick Standish, Charles Edward Strickland Standish (1829–1853)
- Parent(s): Thomas Strickland Standish (1763–1813) and Anastasia Maria Lawson (1769–1807)

Charles Strickland Standish (March 1790 – 10 June 1863) was a British Whig politician.

Standish was first elected a Whig Member of Parliament for Wigan at the 1837 general election where he served as a representative for the constituency. He held the seat until 1841 when he was defeated in an electoral contest. However, after an election petition unseated Thomas Bright Crosse, he was re-elected for the Wigan constituency, resuming his role as a Member of Parliament. He continued to serve until 1847, when he did not seek re-election marking the conclusion of his parliamentary career.

Standish was Lord of the manor of Standish, in Lancashire.

Parliament of the United Kingdom
Preceded by Richard Potter; John Hodson Kearsley	Member of Parliament for Wigan; 1837–1841; With: William Ewart (1839–1841); Richard Potter (1837–1839)	Succeeded by Peter Greenall; Thomas Bright Crosse
Preceded by Peter Greenall; Thomas Bright Crosse	Member of Parliament for Wigan; 1842–1847; With: James Lindsay (1845–1847); Peter Greenall (1841–1845)	Succeeded by James Alexander Lindsay; Ralph Anthony Thicknesse
