= Westhoughton (constituency) =

Parliamentary constituency in the United Kingdom, 1885–1983

Coordinates: 53°36′N 2°38′W

- Former county constituency for the House of Commons
- County: Lancashire (until 1974); Greater Manchester (from 1974)

1885–1983
- Seats: One
- Created from: South East Lancashire
- Replaced by: Bolton West; Wigan; Leigh; Chorley

Westhoughton was a parliamentary constituency in Lancashire, England. Centred on the former mining and cotton town of Westhoughton, it returned one Member of Parliament (MP) to the House of Commons of the Parliament of the United Kingdom.

The constituency was created for the 1885 general election, and abolished for the 1983 general election.

== History and boundaries ==
Westhoughton in Lancashire, boundaries used 1950–1983

=== 1885–1918 ===
The Redistribution of Seats Act 1885 divided the existing constituency of South East Lancashire into eight single-member seats. The new seat of South-East Lancashire, Westhoughton Division comprised an area surrounding, but not including, the County Borough of Bolton. It consisted of the towns of Aspull, Blackrod, Horwich, Little Lever, and Westhoughton, and the surrounding townships of Anglezarke, Bradshaw, Breightmet, Darcy Lever, Edgworth, Entwistle, Great Lever, Harwood, Heaton, Longworth, Lostock, Middle Hulton, Over Hulton, Quarlton and Rivington, plus Turton Urban District, and the parts of Rumworth, Sharples and Tonge with Haulgh outside the Parliamentary Borough of Bolton.

=== 1918–1950 ===
The Representation of the People Act 1918 reorganised parliamentary seats throughout Great Britain and Ireland. Constituencies were redefined in terms of the urban and rural districts created by the Local Government Act 1894. Lancashire, Westhoughton Division consisted of five adjoining urban districts: Aspull, Blackrod, Hindley, Horwich and Westhoughton.

=== 1950–1983 ===
The next redrawing of English constituencies was effected by the Representation of the People Act 1948. The Act introduced the term "county constituency". Westhoughton County Constituency was enlarged by the addition of Standish with Langtree Urban District and Wigan Rural District. The revised boundaries were first used at the 1950 general election, and were unchanged until abolition.

=== Abolition ===
The 1983 redistribution of seats reflected local government reforms made in 1974. The bulk of the seat became part of the parliamentary county of Greater Manchester: Blackrod, Horwich and Westhoughton formed part of the new Bolton West county constituency, Aspull and Standish part of Wigan borough constituency and Hindley was included in Leigh borough constituency. Some parishes in the north of the old constituency remained in Lancashire, and were included in Chorley county constituency.

== Members of Parliament ==
Election	Member	Party
1885	Frank Hardcastle	Conservative
1892	Edward Stanley	Conservative
1906	William Wilson	Labour
1921 by-election	Rhys Davies	Labour
1951 by-election	Tom Price	Labour
1973 by-election	Roger Stott	Labour
1983	constituency abolished	

== Election results ==
=== Elections in the 1880s ===
General election 1885: Westhoughton
Party	Candidate	Votes	%
Conservative	Frank Hardcastle	6,011	61.6
Liberal	Edward Cross	3,741	38.4
Majority		2,270	23.2
Turnout		9,752	91.8
Registered electors		10,625	
Conservative win (new seat)			

General election 1886: Westhoughton
Party	Candidate	Votes	%	±%
Conservative	Frank Hardcastle	Unopposed		
Conservative hold				

=== Elections in the 1890s ===
General election 1892: Westhoughton
Party	Candidate	Votes	%	±%
Conservative	Edward Stanley	6,711	57.9	N/A
Liberal	Lewis Haslam	4,871	42.1	New
Majority		1,840	15.8	N/A
Turnout		11,582	89.2	N/A
Registered electors		12,979		
Conservative hold		Swing	N/A	

General election 1895: Westhoughton
Party	Candidate	Votes	%	±%
Conservative	Edward Stanley	Unopposed		
Conservative hold				

=== Elections in the 1900s ===
General election 1900: Westhoughton
Party	Candidate	Votes	%	±%
Conservative	Edward Stanley	7,989	61.7	N/A
Liberal	Franklin Thomasson	4,949	38.3	New
Majority		3,040	23.4	N/A
Turnout		12,938	81.7	N/A
Registered electors		15,827		
Conservative hold		Swing	N/A	

1903 Westhoughton by-election
Party	Candidate	Votes	%	±%
Conservative	Edward Stanley	Unopposed		
Conservative hold				

General election 1906: Westhoughton
Party	Candidate	Votes	%	±%
Labour Repr. Cmte.	William Wilson	9,262	60.2	New
Conservative	Edward Stanley	6,134	39.8	−21.9
Majority		3,128	20.4	N/A
Turnout		15,396	85.6	+3.9
Registered electors		17,984		
Labour Repr. Cmte. gain from Conservative		Swing		

=== Elections in the 1910s ===
General election January 1910: Westhoughton
Party	Candidate	Votes	%	±%
Labour	William Wilson	10,141	56.8	−3.4
Conservative	H. M. Byrne	7,709	43.2	+3.4
Majority		2,432	13.6	−6.8
Turnout		17,850	90.4	+4.8
Registered electors		19,751		
Labour hold		Swing	−3.4	

General election December 1910: Westhoughton
Party	Candidate	Votes	%	±%
Labour	William Wilson	9,064	53.2	−3.6
Conservative	G. F. Clarke	7,974	46.8	+3.6
Majority		1,090	6.4	−7.2
Turnout		17,038	86.3	−4.1
Registered electors		19,751		
Labour hold		Swing	−3.6	

General election 1918: Westhoughton
Party	Candidate	Votes	%	±%
Labour	William Wilson	11,849	63.9	+10.7
Independent Liberal	James Tonge	6,697	36.1	New
Majority		5,152	27.8	+21.4
Turnout		18,546	61.6	−24.7
Registered electors		30,108		
Labour hold		Swing		

=== Elections in the 1920s ===
1921 Westhoughton by-election
Party	Candidate	Votes	%	±%
Labour	Rhys Davies	14,876	57.8	−6.1
Liberal	James Tonge	10,867	42.2	+6.1
Majority		4,009	15.6	−12.2
Turnout		25,743	84.7	+23.1
Registered electors		30,409		
Labour hold		Swing	−6.1	

- Endorsed by the Coalition Government

General election 1922: Westhoughton
Party	Candidate	Votes	%	±%
Labour	Rhys Davies	14,846	55.4	−8.5
National Liberal	James Tonge	11,937	44.6	+8.5
Majority		2,909	10.8	−17.0
Turnout		26,783	85.4	+23.8
Registered electors		31,351		
Labour hold		Swing	−8.5	

General election 1923: Westhoughton
Party	Candidate	Votes	%	±%
Labour	Rhys Davies	15,347	60.3	+4.9
Unionist	John Haslam	10,103	39.7	New
Majority		5,244	20.6	+9.8
Turnout		25,450	79.3	−6.1
Registered electors		32,081		
Labour hold		Swing	+4.9	

General election 1924: Westhoughton
Party	Candidate	Votes	%	±%
Labour	Rhys Davies	16,033	55.8	−4.5
Unionist	John Haslam	12,684	44.2	+4.5
Majority		3,349	11.6	−9.0
Turnout		28,717	88.8	+8.8
Registered electors		32,587		
Labour hold		Swing	−4.5	

General election 1929: Westhoughton
Party	Candidate	Votes	%	±%
Labour	Rhys Davies	22,305	61.5	+5.7
Unionist	James Wain Lomax	9,855	27.2	−17.0
Liberal	Ernest Everett Canney	4,132	11.4	New
Majority		12,450	34.3	+22.7
Turnout		36,292	87.1	−1.7
Registered electors		41,648		
Labour hold		Swing	+11.3	

=== Elections in the 1930s ===
General election 1931: Westhoughton
Party	Candidate	Votes	%	±%
Labour	Rhys Davies	19,301	53.46	
Conservative	P. Higson	16,801	46.54	
Majority		2,500	6.92	
Turnout		36,102	85.49	
Labour hold		Swing		

General election 1935: Westhoughton
Party	Candidate	Votes	%	±%
Labour	Rhys Davies	21,093	60.36	
Conservative	H. O. Dixon	13,851	39.64	
Majority		7,242	20.72	
Turnout		34,944	83.24	
Labour hold		Swing		

=== Elections in the 1940s ===
General election 1945: Westhoughton
Party	Candidate	Votes	%	±%
Labour	Rhys Davies	20,990	64.91	
Conservative	Stanley Bell	11,346	35.09	
Majority		9,644	29.82	
Turnout		32,336	77.44	
Labour hold		Swing		

=== Elections in the 1950s ===
General election 1950: Westhougton
Party	Candidate	Votes	%	±%
Labour	Rhys Davies	30,117	62.26	
Conservative	F. Joan Crowther	18,259	37.74	
Majority		11,858	24.52	
Turnout		48,376	88.30	
Labour hold		Swing		

1951 Westhoughton by-election
Party	Candidate	Votes	%	±%
Labour	Tom Price	25,368	60.4	−1.9
Conservative	Frank J. Land	16,614	39.6	+1.9
Majority		8,754	20.8	−3.7
Turnout		41,982		
Labour hold		Swing		

General election 1951: Westhoughton
Party	Candidate	Votes	%	±%
Labour	Tom Price	29,319	61.13	
Conservative	Frank J. Land	18,644	38.87	
Majority		10,675	22.26	
Turnout		47,963	86.6	
Labour hold		Swing		

General election 1955: Westhoughton
Party	Candidate	Votes	%	±%
Labour	Tom Price	27,900	60.99	
Conservative	Eric Dunnett	17,848	39.01	
Majority		10,052	21.98	
Turnout		45,748	82.95	
Labour hold		Swing		

General election 1959: Westhoughton
Party	Candidate	Votes	%	±%
Labour	Tom Price	29,359	61.17	
Conservative	John Edward Gouldbourn	18,634	38.83	
Majority		10,725	22.34	
Turnout		47,993	84.28	
Labour hold		Swing		

=== Elections in the 1960s ===
General election 1964: Westhoughton
Party	Candidate	Votes	%	±%
Labour	Tom Price	30,249	61.75	
Conservative	John I. Hanrahan	18,738	38.25	
Majority		11,511	23.50	
Turnout		48,987	81.92	
Labour hold		Swing		

General election 1966: Westhoughton
Party	Candidate	Votes	%	±%
Labour	Tom Price	31,387	64.96	
Conservative	John I. Hanrahan	16,927	35.04	
Majority		14,460	29.92	
Turnout		48,314	78.75	
Labour hold		Swing		

=== Elections in the 1970s ===
General election 1970: Westhoughton
Party	Candidate	Votes	%	±%
Labour	Tom Price	29,674	55.4	−9.6
Conservative	Cyril A. Unsworth	23,847	44.6	+9.6
Majority		5,827	10.9	−19.0
Turnout		53,521	76.9	−1.8
Labour hold		Swing		

1973 Westhoughton by-election
Party	Candidate	Votes	%	±%
Labour	Roger Stott	26,294	57.0	+1.6
Conservative	Cyril A. Unsworth	19,511	42.3	−2.3
Democratic Socialist	Brian O'Hara	335	0.7	New
Majority		6,783	14.7	+3.8
Turnout		46,140		
Labour hold		Swing		

General election February 1974: Westhoughton
Party	Candidate	Votes	%	±%
Labour	Roger Stott	30,574	51.5	−5.5
Conservative	Brian H. Tetlow	17,909	30.1	−12.2
Liberal	R. S. Hale	10,939	18.4	New
Majority		12,665	21.3	+6.6
Turnout		59,422	83.2	
Labour hold		Swing		

General election October 1974: Westhoughton
Party	Candidate	Votes	%	±%
Labour	Roger Stott	30,373	54.1	+2.6
Conservative	Brian H. Tetlow	16,798	29.9	−0.2
Liberal	R. S. Hale	8,926	15.9	−2.5
Majority		13,575	24.2	+2.9
Turnout		56,097	77.9	−5.3
Labour hold		Swing		

General election 1979: Westhoughton
Party	Candidate	Votes	%	±%
Labour	Roger Stott	29,685	48.2	−5.9
Conservative	Carolyn Johnson	24,398	39.6	+9.7
Liberal	J. Pigott	7,544	12.2	−3.7
Majority		5,287	8.6	−15.6
Turnout		61,627	80.1	+2.2
Labour hold		Swing		
