= 1921 Westhoughton by-election =

UK Parliamentary by-election

The 1921 Westhoughton by-election was held on 5 October 1921. The by-election was held due to the death of the incumbent Labour MP, William Wilson. It was won by the Labour candidate Rhys Davies.

== Result ==
Westhoughton by-election, 1921
Party		Candidate	Votes	%	±%
	Labour	Rhys Davies	14,876	57.8	−6.1
C	Liberal	James Tonge	10,867	42.2	+6.1
Majority			4,009	15.6	−12.2
Turnout			25,653	84.7	−23.1
	Labour hold		Swing	−6.1	
C indicates candidate endorsed by the coalition government.
