= Ian Stevenson Webster =

His Honour Ian Stevenson Webster (20 March 1925 – 9 March 2002), was a British Judge and briefly a Liberal Party politician.

== Background ==
He was a son of Harvey Webster and Annabella Stevenson McBain. He was educated at Rochdale Grammar School and Manchester University. In 1951 he married Margaret Sharples. They had two sons Alistair and Robin. The elder son, Alistair, is a QC and a Recorder. The younger son, Robin, is the Chief Risk Officer for an insurance company.

== World War Two ==
In 1943 Webster joined the Fleet Air Arm of the Royal Navy as a pilot. In 1944 he became a Sub-Lieutenant in the Royal Navy Volunteer Reserve. He was attached to the first night fighter squadron formed by the Navy and saw active service in the North Atlantic. He left the Navy in 1946.

== Political career ==
He was Liberal candidate for the Wigan division of Lancashire at the 1950 General Election. He was the first Liberal candidate to contest Wigan since 1918. The 1950 elections were tough for Liberal candidates and he finished third;

General Election 1950
Party	Candidate	Votes	%	±%
Labour	Ronald Watkins Williams	32,746	62.52	−5.64
Conservative	Harold Dowling	15,733	30.04	−1.80
Liberal	Ian Stevenson Webster	2,651	5.06	N/A
Communist	T Rowlandson	1,243	2.37	N/A
Majority		17,013	32.48	
Turnout			89.27	
Labour hold		Swing		

He did not stand for parliament again.

== Professional career ==
Webster qualified as a Barrister and in 1948 received a Call to the Bar by the Middle Temple. Basing himself in his home town of Rochdale, he worked on the Northern Circuit. In 1970 he became Assistant Recorder of Oldham. In 1971 he became Assistant Recorder of Salford. In 1972 he became a Recorder of the Crown Court. In 1976 he became Chairman of the Industrial Tribunals for Manchester. In 1981 he became a Circuit Judge, first as Liaison Judge for the Burnley, Reedley and Accrington Benches. In 1985 he became Resident Judge for Burnley. In 1987 he became Liaison Judge for the Rochdale, Middleton and Heywood Benches. In 1991 he became Hon. Recorder for Burnley. He retired in 1995.
