= Ralph Thicknesse =

British Member of Parliament

Ralph Thicknesse (1768 – 1 November 1842) was a British politician.

Born around 1768, the only son of Ralph Thicknesse, and Anne Dorothy (née Bostock). He married Sarah Woodcock on 20 December 1798 and they had one son, Ralph Anthony Thicknesse (1800–54), who also went on to become an MP for Wigan.

They had a residence called Beech Hill, to the north of Wigan, described as a farmhouse dating to the late 17th century, it stood in its own grounds.

Ralph Thicknesse established himself as a banker in Wigan in partnership with his brother-in-law Thomas Woodcock of Bank House. They founded Wigan Bank in 1792. He had withdrawn from the bank by 1834 at which time the bank was renamed Woodcock and Son.

He was engaged in the coal trade with interests in Ince and Aspull and was a co-proprietor of the Kirkless colliery.

In 1830 he was one of the initial proprietors of the Wigan Branch Railway becoming its first Chairman once it was established.

He was Member of Parliament (MP) for the Borough of Wigan in Lancashire from 1831 to 1834.

He died, aged 74, at Beech Hill, 1 November 1842 leaving all his property, including mines and collieries, to his only child, Ralph Anthony Thicknesse (1800–54).

== Notes ==
Parliament of the United Kingdom
Preceded by John Hodson Kearsley; Lieutenant-Colonel James Lindsay	Member of Parliament for Wigan; 1831–1834; With: John Hodson Kearsley (in 1831); Richard Potter (1832 - 1834)	Succeeded by Richard Potter; John Hodson Kearsley
