= Robert Markland =

English politician

Robert Markland was an English politician who sat in the House of Commons in 1659.

Markland was from a Wigan family which was long present in the borough and possessed considerable local influence. He was a manufacturer or mercer.

In 1659, Markland was elected Member of Parliament for Wigan in the Third Protectorate Parliament.

Parliament of England
Preceded by Not represented in Second Protectorate Parliament	Member of Parliament for Wigan; 1659; With: Hugh Forth	Succeeded by Not represented in Restored Rump
