= 1948 Wigan by-election =

UK parliamentary by-election

The 1948 Wigan by-election of 4 March 1948 was held after the death of the incumbent Labour MP, William Foster.

The by-election was contested by four candidates: Ronald Williams (Labour), Harold Dowling (Conservative), Thomas Rowlandson (Communist), and Owen L Roberts (King's Cavalier). Roberts was an ex-RAF Pathfinder observer fighting the election "for the peace and prosperity of the country."

The result was a hold for the Labour Party, with Williams gaining 59.1% of the vote, in spite of a 6.5% swing to the Conservative Party.

== Result of the by-election ==
Wigan by-election, 1948
Party	Candidate	Votes	%	±%
Labour	Ronald Williams	28,941	59.1	▼9.1
Conservative	Harold Dowling	17,466	35.6	▲3.8
Communist	Thomas Rowlandson	1,647	3.7	New
King's Cavalier	Owen L Roberts	932	1.6	New
Majority		11,475	23.4	▼12.9
Turnout		48,986		
Labour hold		Swing	▼6.5	

== Result of the previous General Election ==
General election 1945: Wigan
Party	Candidate	Votes	%	±%
Labour	William Foster	31,392	68.2	▲6.9
Conservative	Evelyn Charles Lacy Hulbert-Powell	14,666	31.8	▼6.9
Majority		16,726	36.4	▲13.8
Turnout		46,058	80.4	▼1.3
Labour hold		Swing	▲6.9	
