= 1958 Wigan by-election =

UK Parliamentary by-election

The 1958 Wigan by-election of 12 June 1958 was held after the death of the incumbent Labour Member of Parliament (MP) Ronald Williams.

The by-election was contested by three candidates: Alan Fitch (Labour), John Hodgson (Conservative), and Michael Weaver (Communist).

The result was a hold for the Labour Party, with Fitch gaining 71% of the vote on a 6.2% swing from the Conservative Party.

== Result of the by-election ==
Wigan by-election, 1958
Party	Candidate	Votes	%	±%
Labour	Alan Fitch	27,415	71.0	▲6.6
Conservative	John Hodgson	10,248	26.5	▼5.7
Communist	Michael Weaver	972	2.5	▼0.9
Majority		17,167	44.4	▲12.2
Turnout		38,635		
Labour hold		Swing	▲6.2	

== Result of the previous General Election ==
General election 1955: Wigan
Party	Candidate	Votes	%	±%
Labour	Ronald Williams	29,755	64.4	▼2.5
Conservative	Harold D Lowe	14,883	32.2	▼0.9
Communist	Thomas Rowlandson	1,567	3.4	New
Majority		14,872	32.2	▼1.6
Turnout		46,205	80.3	▼6.7
Labour hold		Swing	▼0.8	
