= Rhys Davies (politician) =

British politician (1877–1954)

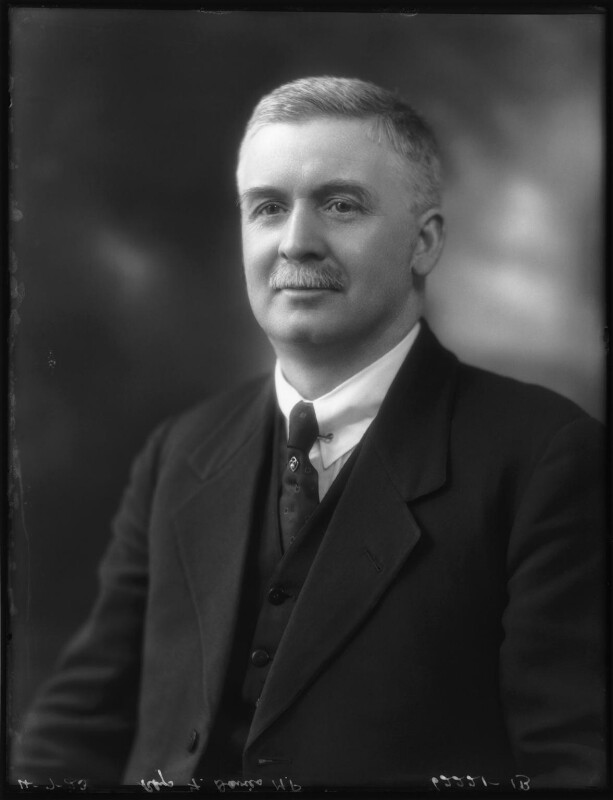
Davies

Rhys John Davies (16 April 1877 – 31 October 1954) was a British trade unionist and Labour Party politician.

Davies was born in Llangennech, Carmarthenshire, Wales, the son of Rhys and Ann Davies. After an elementary education he initially worked as a farm labourer. He subsequently moved to the Rhondda Valley, where he worked as a coalminer for ten years. From an early age he was involved in the local co-operative society and became a union official organising shop-assistants throughout South Wales. This led to his moving to Manchester, to take up a post with the Amalgamated Union of Co-operative Employees and later the National Union of Distributive and Allied Workers.

He was a member of Manchester City Council for thirty years, and also president of the Manchester and Salford Trades Council and of the Withington Divisional Parliamentary Labour Party.

In 1921, William Wilson, Labour Member of Parliament (MP) for Westhoughton, died, and Davies was elected at a by-election to succeed him. He served in the first Labour Government in 1924 as Under-Secretary of State for the Home Department. This was the only government office he held.

He retained the Westhoughton seat through successive elections until he retired from the House of Commons early in 1951 due to ill health. At the time he was the longest-serving Labour MP. Davies was a strong supporter of the temperance and pacifist movements, whose causes he advocated in Parliament and in the country. He was also a committed parliamentarian, and served as joint secretary of the British group of the Inter-Parliamentary Union.

He married Margaret Griffiths in 1902, and they had three sons. Davies died at his home in Porthcawl, Glamorgan, in 1954, aged 77.

Parliament of the United Kingdom
| Preceded by William Wilson | Member of Parliament for Westhoughton; 1921–1951 | Succeeded by Tom Price |
Political offices
| Preceded by Godfrey Locker-Lampson | Under-Secretary of State for the Home Department; January 1924 – November 1924 | Succeeded by Godfrey Locker-Lampson |
