= Frank Hardcastle =

Frank Hardcastle (12 May 1844 – 6 November 1908) was a bleacher and businessman and Conservative politician who sat in the House of Commons from 1885 to 1892.

Hardcastle born at Firwood Hall (demolished 1969), in Tonge, near Bolton, Lancashire was the fourth son of James Hardcastle of Firwood and Pen-y-lan, Ruabon, Denbighshire and Hannah Compton Jackson. Following education at Preston Grammar School and Repton School where he excelled at cricket, Hardcastle joined the family business of T. Hardcastle and Sons, bleachers and dyers, of Firwood Works. The company had been formed by his grandfather Thomas Hardcastle in 1803. Hardcastle played cricket regularly from 1864 representing Manchester, Bolton and the Gentlemen of Lancashire. In 1869 he played two first-class matches for Lancashire County Cricket Club.

Hardcastle rose to be head of the family bleaching firm and also became president of the United Bleachers' Association of Lancashire and Cheshire. His cousin Thomas Hardcastle Sykes was head of one of the other major bleachers. Hardcastle was also the proprietor of Breightmet Colliery near Bolton.

Hardcastle was the first Member of Parliament for Westhoughton, a constituency created by the Redistribution of Seats Act 1885. He was re-elected unopposed in the ensuing general election of 1886. While in parliament, Hardcastle represented the interests of the bleaching industry. He retired from parliament on health grounds in 1892. He was a justice of the peace for Lancashire, and was High Sheriff of Lancashire in 1895.

Hardcastle moved from Lancashire to Southsea in Hampshire, and finally to London. He died suddenly from heart failure at his residence, 87 Lancaster Gate, Paddington in 1908, aged 64.

Hardcastle married Ida Ross in 1885, and they had five daughters before her death in 1894. In 1902 he married again. His second wife was Mary Elizabeth Armytage Moore (c1845-1932), previously Mary Elizabeth Lockwood, née Mary Elizabeth Metcalfe (she had been twice widowed, her previous marriages being to (1) Horace Day Lockwood, son of Henry Francis Lockwood, and then to (2) William Armitage Moore), whom he married at St Margaret's, Westminster on 10 June 1902. One of her daughters, Priscilla Armytage-Moore, became Priscilla, Countess of Annesley (see Hugh Annesley, 5th Earl Annesley).

Parliament of the United Kingdom
New constituency previously South East Lancashire	Member of Parliament for Westhoughton; 1885–1892	Succeeded by Edward Stanley
Honorary titles
Preceded by Joshua W. Radcliffe	High Sheriff of Lancashire; 1895	Succeeded by Sir Peter Carlew Walker
