= Neil Turner (British politician) =

British politician (born 1945)

Member of Parliament for Wigan
- In office 23 September 1999 – 12 April 2010
- Preceded by: Roger Stott
- Succeeded by: Lisa Nandy

Personal details
- Born: 16 September 1945 (age 80) Carlisle, Cumberland, England
- Party: Labour
- Spouse: Susan Price

Neil Turner (born 16 September 1945) is a Labour Party politician in the United Kingdom and former Member of Parliament (MP) for Wigan. He was elected in a 1999 by-election and stood down at the 2010 general election.

== Early life ==
Turner went to Carlisle Grammar School, which became the Trinity School in 1968. He was a quantity surveyor for Fairclough Builders, which became AMEC, from 1967–94, then was Operations Director for North Shropshire District Council from 1995–7.

== Parliamentary career ==
He represented the North West Region on the National Committee of the Labour Party Young Socialists in 1970, following Roger Stott. He contested the seat of Oswestry in 1970. He was the Parliamentary Private Secretary to Ian McCartney as: Minister of State, Department for Work and Pensions 2001–03, Minister without Portfolio and Party Chairman 2003–06 and Minister of State for Trade 2006–07.

When a dyslexic constituent, Stephen Halsall (a psychiatric nurse), sent him a letter in March 2001 complaining about a drug rehabilitation unit being built near to him, Turner returned the letter to the constituent with all the spelling and grammatical errors underlined and annotated in red ink, e.g., we only have 1 Labour Party – should be Party's.

On 31 July 2009, Turner announced his decision to stand down at the 2010 general election.

== Personal life ==
Turner married Susan Price on 26 March 1971 in Wigan and has one son. He follows Wigan Warriors.

Parliament of the United Kingdom
Preceded by Roger Stott	Member of Parliament for Wigan; 1999 – 2010	Succeeded by Lisa Nandy
