= Roger Downes =

English lawyer and politician

Roger Downes (died 1638) was an English lawyer and politician who sat in the House of Commons in 1601 and from 1621 to 1622.

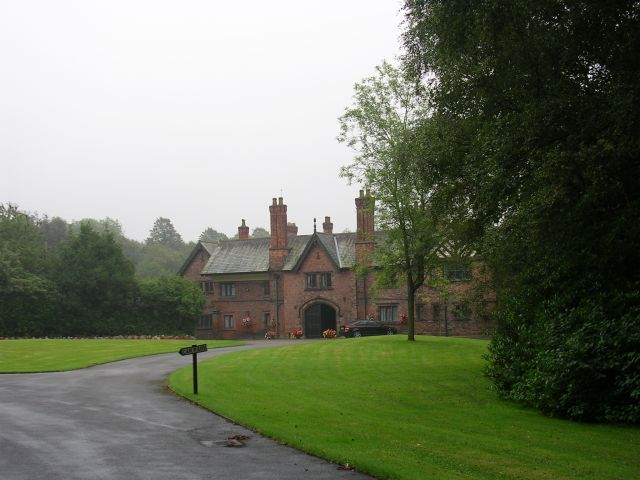
Wardley Hall

Downes was the son Roger Downes of Shrigley, Cheshire. He was a student of Staple Inn and then of Gray's Inn in 1589 and was called to the bar in 1599. In 1601, he was elected member of parliament for Wigan. At about this time, he acquired Wardley Hall, a moated manor house with a private chapel and 20 bedrooms. He was summer reader for Gray's Inn in 1615. In 1621, he was elected MP for Wigan again. He was dean of the chapel of Gray's Inn in 1624. In 1625, he was vice-chamberlain of Cheshire. He was treasurer of Gray's Inn in 1628.

Downes died in 1638 and was buried in Wigan on 6 July.

Downes' first marriage was to Elizabeth Gerard, daughter of Miles Gerard of Ince, and took place in Wigan on 23 April 1601. She gave birth to a son, but he died in 1602. Downes' second marriage was to Anne Calvert, daughter of John Calvert of Cockeram. She bore two sons and one daughter. Anne was a Catholic, and their second son, Francis, who was also MP for Wigan, later converted.

Parliament of England
Preceded by Edward Legh; Nicholas Smyth	Member of Parliament for Wigan; 1601; With: John Pulteney	Succeeded by Sir William Cooke; Sir John Pulteney
Preceded by Gilbert Gerard; Sir Richard Molyneux	Member of Parliament for Wigan; 1621–1622; With: Sir Thomas Gerard, 1st Baronet	Succeeded by Sir Anthony St John; Francis Downes
