= Tom Price (British politician) =

British trade unionist and politician (1902–1973)

Member of Parliament for Westhoughton
- In office 1951–1973

Personal details
- Born: 9 October 1902 Pendlebury, Lancashire, England
- Died: 1 February 1973 (aged 70) London, England
- Party: Labour
- Spouse: Muriel Wilcock (m. 1933)
- Children: 2

Joseph Thomas Price (9 October 1902 – 1 February 1973) was a British trade unionist and Labour Party politician.

== Biography ==
He was born in Pendlebury, Lancashire, the son of William Price, a coalminer, and his wife Elizabeth. He was educated at St Peter's School, Swinton, and Salford Grammar School.

He became chief legal officer of the Union of Shop, Distributive and Allied Workers in 1921, and was the secretary of both the Eccles Division Parliamentary Labour Party and the Swinton and Pendlebury Trades and Labour Council. He married Muriel Anna Wilcock in 1933, and they had two children.

In 1951, Rhys Davies, the Labour member of parliament for Westhoughton, announced his resignation due to ill health. Price was selected as the Labour candidate for the ensuing byelection, and successfully held the seat. He retained the seat until his death in 1973, aged 70, in London.

Outside Parliament Price was a keen hill walker in the Lake District and Pennines, and was a founder member of the Youth Hostel movement.

Parliament of the United Kingdom
Preceded by Rhys Davies	Member of Parliament for Westhoughton; 1951–1973	Succeeded by Roger Stott
