= Edward Bridgeman (MP) =

English politician (after 1588 – 1646)

Edward Bridgeman (born after 1588 – 1646) was an English politician who sat in the House of Commons between 1625 and 1629.

Believed to have been born after 1588, Bridgeman was the fourth son of Thomas Bridgeman of Greenway, Devon and grandson of Edward Bridgeman.

Bridgeman moved to Wigan, Lancashire, when his older brother John, later Bishop of Chester, became Rector of the parish in 1616. He was a law student, listed as a member of Gray's Inn in 1624, and became a justice of the peace (JP) for the county of Lancaster in 1628, although he was a poor attender at quarter sessions and there was an attempt to remove him from the bench in 1638 after a serious brawl.

In 1625, he was elected member of parliament for Wigan. He was elected MP for Liverpool in 1626. In 1628 he was elected MP for Wigan again and sat until 1629 when King Charles decided to rule without parliament for eleven years.

Bridgeman was twice married. His married firstly, on 30 June 1627, Elenor, daughter of Sir Richard Brooke of Little Sankey, Cheshire, but the marriage was childless and she died in 1638. He remarried to Anne, daughter of Sir Hugh Chamberlaine of Chester; with her he had one daughter and also acquired a house at Sankey Bridge, Warrington.

Bridgeman supported the Royalist cause at the outbreak of the English Civil War, as result of which his house was captured by Roundhead troops in 1643 and he was fined £100 as a Royalist 'delinquent'. He died a prisoner of parliament while being escorted to London in 1646.

He left his widow, who remarried and lived until 1685, and his only daughter who married Sir John Edgeworth. Bridgeman was uncle of Sir Orlando Bridgeman, 1st Baronet, of Great Lever who was ancestor of the Earls of Bradford.

Parliament of England
Preceded by Sir Anthony St John; Francis Downes	Member of Parliament for Wigan; 1625; With: Francis Downes	Succeeded by Sir Anthony St John; Sir William Pooley
Preceded by James Lord Strange; Edward Moore	Member of Parliament for Liverpool; 1626; With: Thomas Stanley	Succeeded by Henry Jermyn; John Newdigate
Preceded by Sir Anthony St John; Sir William Pooley	Member of Parliament for Wigan; 1628–1629; With: Sir Anthony St John	Parliament suspended until 1640
