= 1951 Westhoughton by-election =

UK parliamentary by-election

The 1951 Westhoughton by-election took place on 21 June 1951. The contest followed the resignation of the sitting Labour Party Member of Parliament, Rhys Davies.

In April 1951 Davies, who had held the Westhoughton constituency in south Lancashire for thirty years, announced that he would not be standing for parliament again. At the time he was Labour's longest serving MP. He subsequently resigned from the Commons due to ill health, and the writ to hold a by-election to fill the vacancy was moved on 31 May. At the time of Davies's resignation, the Labour Party held a slim majority of only five seats, following the 1950 general election. Davies had secured a majority of nearly 12,000 votes over the Conservatives in 1950.

Nominations for the by-election closed on 12 June, and there were only two candidates: Tom Price, the forty-eight-year-old chief legal officer of the Union of Shop, Distributive and Allied Workers for the Labour Party; and Frank J. Land, a thirty-eight-year-old master baker from Bolton for the Conservatives.

Price belonged to the same trades union as Davies, and had strong connections with south Lancashire. Land was a member of the Bolton Chamber of Trade, and vice-chairman of Bolton Young Conservatives. On 14 June, Winston Churchill, Conservative leader, issued a statement in support of Land and attacking the Labour government who he blamed for the fall in the value of the pound. Price campaigned on the record of the Labour government, claiming it had done a great deal to improve the life of ordinary people. Land called for an end to nationalisation of industries, claiming this led to higher prices. Both candidates supported a programme of building large numbers of council houses.

== Result ==
Price retained the seat comfortably for the government, although with a reduced majority:

Westhoughton by-election, 1951
Party	Candidate	Votes	%	±%
Labour	Tom Price	25,368	60.4	−1.8
Conservative	Frank J. Land	16,614	39.6	+1.8
Majority		8,754	20.8	−3.7
Turnout		41,982		
Labour hold		Swing	−1.8	
