= Francis Downes =

English politician

Francis Downes (1606–1648) was an English politician who sat in the House of Commons in 1624 and 1625.

Downes was the second son of Roger Downes of Wardley Hall, and his second wife Anne Calvert, daughter of John Calvert of Cockeram. His mother was a Catholic and Downes also adopted the Catholic faith. He matriculated at Brasenose College, Oxford on 5 December 1623, aged 17 and was a student of Gray's Inn in 1623. In 1624, he was elected member of parliament for Wigan. He was re-elected MP for Wigan in 1625.

Parliament of England
Preceded by Roger Downes; Sir Thomas Gerard, 1st Baronet	Member of Parliament for Wigan; 1624–1625; With: Sir Anthony St John 1624; Edward Bridgeman 1625	Succeeded by Sir Anthony St John; Sir William Pooley
