= 1942 Wigan by-election =

UK Parliamentary by-election

The 1942 Wigan by-election of 11 March 1942 was held after the death of the incumbent Labour MP, John Parkinson.

The by-election was only contested by one candidate, William Foster, who retained the seat for Labour unopposed.

== Result of the by-election ==
Wigan by-election, 1942
| Party | Candidate | Votes | % | ±% |
|---|---|---|---|---|
| Labour | William Foster | Unopposed | | |
| Labour hold | | | | |

== Result of the previous General election ==
General election 1935: Wigan
| Party | Candidate | Votes | % | ±% |
|---|---|---|---|---|
| Labour | John Parkinson | 27,950 | 61.3 | ▲10.2 |
| Conservative | Robert Grant-Ferris | 17,646 | 38.7 | ▼10.2 |
| Majority | | 10,304 | 22.6 | ▲20.4 |
| Turnout | | 45,596 | 81.7 | ▼2.5 |
| Labour hold | | Swing | ▲10.2 | |
