= Hugh Forth =

English politician

Hugh Forth (6 July 1610 – 20 February 1676) was an English politician who sat in the House of Commons in 1659 and 1660.

Forth was a merchant of the City of London. In 1659, he was elected Member of Parliament for Wigan in the Third Protectorate Parliament. He was re-elected MP for Wigan in April 1660 for the Convention Parliament but the election was declared void in July.

Forth died at the age of 65.

Forth married a daughter of John Rigby of Middleton.

Parliament of England
Preceded by Not represented in Second Protectorate Parliament	Member of Parliament for Wigan; 1659; With: Robert Markland	Succeeded by Not represented in Restored Rump
