= 1973 Westhoughton by-election =

UK Parliamentary by-election

The 1973 Westhoughton by election took place for the House of Commons of the United Kingdom in Westhoughton on 24 May 1973.

It was won by Roger Stott who held the seat for Labour after the death on 1 February of the previous MP, Tom Price.

== Result ==
By-election 1973: Westhoughton
Party	Candidate	Votes	%	±%
Labour	Roger Stott	26,294	57.0	+1.6
Conservative	Cyril A. Unsworth	19,511	42.3	−2.3
Democratic Socialist	Brian O'Hara	335	0.7	New
Majority		6,783	14.7	+3.9
Turnout		46,140		
Labour hold		Swing		

== Previous result ==
General election 1970: Westhoughton
Party	Candidate	Votes	%	±%
Labour	Tom Price	29,674	55.4	−9.6
Conservative	Cyril A. Unsworth	23,847	44.6	+9.6
Majority		5,827	10.8	−19.0
Turnout		53,521	76.9	−1.8
Labour hold		Swing		
