= Thomas Bright Crosse =

British politician (1796–1886)

Member of Parliament for Wigan
- In office 1 July 1841 – 11 April 1842 Serving with Peter Greenall
- Preceded by: William Ewart; Charles Strickland Standish
- Succeeded by: Peter Greenall; Charles Strickland Standish

Personal details
- Born: 1796
- Died: 21 March 1886 (aged 89–90)
- Party: Conservative

Thomas Bright Crosse (1796 – 21 March 1886) was a British Conservative politician.

Crosse was elected Conservative Member of Parliament for Wigan at the 1841 general election but was removed on election petition the following year.

Parliament of the United Kingdom
Preceded by William Ewart; Charles Strickland Standish	Member of Parliament for Wigan; 1841–1842; With: Peter Greenall	Succeeded by Peter Greenall; Charles Strickland Standish
