= Harmood Banner =

British accountant and auditor

- Born: 1782
- Died: 1865 (aged 82–83)
- Occupation: Accountant

Harmood Banner (1782–1865) was a British accountant and auditor. He played a major role in the development of accounting and finance in Liverpool, establishing the foundation for the Liverpool Society of Chartered Accountants 1870; which, in turn, played a part in the formation of the Institute of Chartered Accountants in England and Wales in 1880. He could be said to be the father of professional accounting in England.

== Life ==
The origins of the name Harmood lie in the family history. Royal Navy Captain Harmood's daughter married into the prosperous Banner family, and their son was named Harmood Banner.

Banner was practising as an accountant in Liverpool by 1805. He took on the role of “Corn Inspector” and “Commissioner for Special Bails”. He acted in cases of liquidation, distributing the remaining assets to claimants. He was involved in banking as both auditor and liquidator. He acted as a share broker, including shares in Liverpool’s Liverpool Athenaeum Club, Liverpool Botanic, Botanic Gardens, Liverpool water companies, Manchester and Liverpool Railway, Wigan Branch Railway ventures and Manchester, Liverpool and Hull marine insurance.

Banner married in 1808 and the dowry included a piece of inherited land at the corner of North John Street and Harrington Street. The building known as “Harrington Chambers” was erected and Banner practiced there as an accountant. When his son joined the firm, forming Harmood Banner and Sons, they remained there and the firm remained in the building until 1962. The family home was at Dingle Mount, no longer standing, situated close to Herculaneum Dock.

Banner was a philanthropist associated with the Liverpool Ophthalmic Infirmary (1824), Liverpool Dispensary (1829), Liverpool Female Orphans Asylum (1841), Liverpool Eye and Ear infirmary (1845) and Liverpool Infant Orphans Asylum (1859). He was involved in raising funds to build new hospitals and orphanages, and, as Treasurer and Auditor, in managing the operations of these institutions. Some of the buildings erected are still standing, but others, such as those on Myrtle Street, have been demolished. The orphans’ provision was moved to Salisbury House in South Liverpool, not far from the Beatles beloved “Strawberry Fields”, but this building was itself eventually demolished. In Pen and Ink Studies of Liverpool Councillors, Shimmin noted: "Day by day, Mr. Banner may be found visiting the fatherless in their affliction, and giving to hundreds of destitute orphans that paternal counsel which he well knows how to bestow."

By 1814, Banner was on the committee of Liverpool Lyceum Library and rose to be President. There were cholera outbreaks in Liverpool in 1832, 1849 and 1854. Liverpool's water at the time was drawn from wells and the disease spread due to seepage of sewage. Banner was involved with Liverpool and Harrington Water Company, one of two companies that had been granted rights to supply water. Criticisms of Liverpool water supply were voiced publicly, and he answered them in a pamphlet in 1845 "Water". A copy can be found in Liverpool Central Library and Archive, alongside a reply "Want of Water".

These public pronouncements combined with philanthropic work, and involvement in banking and railways, made Harmood Banner a public figure in Liverpool. An obituary described him as much loved and trusted. His funeral in April 1865 was a major event, attended by firemen, orphans, accounting clerks, and five carriages of his extended family and local notables. In the early morning the cortege passed slowly through the streets, passing through Belvedere Road, Catherine Street and Canning Street, and eventually arriving at St James' Cemetery. His grave is close to the cemetery entrance.
