= Alan Fitch =

British politician (1915–1985)

Ernest Alan Fitch (10 March 1915 – 7 August 1985) was a British Labour Party politician.

Fitch was educated at Kingswood School, Bath (1927–1932), and was a mineworker. He represented mineworkers on the executive committee of the Lancashire and Cheshire Regional Council of Labour.

He was elected to the House of Commons as Member of Parliament for Wigan in a by-election in 1958, following the death of sitting Labour MP Ronald Williams. He was re-elected at the next seven general elections, before stepping down at the 1983 general election, when the seat was held for Labour by Roger Stott.

Fitch was one of only two MPs for Wigan in the 20th century to stand down (retire) rather than die in office. His successor Roger Stott reverted to the trend and died in office in 1999.

Fitch was a government Assistant Whip from 1964 to 1966, a Lord Commissioner of the Treasury from 1966 to 1969 and Vice-Chamberlain of the Household from 1969 to 1970, and was a member of the nationalised industries select committee. Fitch was also a Member of the European Parliament.

Parliament of the United Kingdom
| Preceded by Ronald Williams | Member of Parliament for Wigan; 1958–1983 | Succeeded by Roger Stott |
Political offices
| Preceded by Charles Morris | Vice-Chamberlain of the Household; 1969–1970 | Succeeded by Jasper More |
