= William Foster (British politician) =

British Labour Party politician

William Foster (12 January 1887 – 2 December 1947) was a British Labour Party politician.

He was elected to the House of Commons as Member of Parliament (MP) for Wigan in a by-election in 1942, following the death of sitting Labour MP John Parkinson.

Foster was re-elected at the 1945 general election, but died aged 60 in 1947, before completing his first full term in parliament. In the subsequent by-election in 1948, the seat was held for Labour by Ronald Williams.

Parliament of the United Kingdom
Preceded by John Parkinson	Member of Parliament for Wigan; 1942–1947	Succeeded by Ronald Williams
