= Wigan (constituency) =

Parliamentary constituency in the United Kingdom, 1885 onwards

Coordinates: 53°32′N 2°38′W

- County constituency for the House of Commons
- Interactive map of boundaries since 2024
- Location within North West England
- County: Greater Manchester
- Electorate: 75,706 (March 2020)

Current constituency
- Created: 1885
- Member of Parliament: Lisa Nandy (Labour)
- Seats: 1
- Created from: Wigan, South West Lancashire

1545–1885
- Seats: Two
- Type of constituency: Borough constituency
- Replaced by: Wigan

Wigan is a constituency (Note: A county constituency (for the purposes of election expenses and type of returning officer)) in Greater Manchester, represented in the House of Commons of the Parliament of the United Kingdom. The seat has been represented by Lisa Nandy of the Labour Party since 2010. (Note: As with all constituencies, the constituency elects one Member of Parliament (MP) by the first past the post system of election at least every five years.) Nandy currently serves as Secretary of State for Culture, Media and Sport under the government of Andy Burnham.

== History ==
Wigan in Lancashire, boundaries used 1974–1983

Wigan was incorporated as a borough on 26 August 1246, after the issue of a charter by Henry III. In 1295 and January 1307 Wigan was one of the significant places called upon to send a representative, then known as a 'burgess', to the Model Parliament. However, for the remainder of the medieval period the seat was not summoned to send an official despite being one of only four boroughs in Lancashire possessing Royal Charters; the others were Lancaster, Liverpool and Preston. This changed in the Tudor period with Henry VIII's grant of two Members of Parliament to the town.

Following the Redistribution of Seats Act 1885, single-member constituencies were imposed nationwide, (Note: Exceptions were the twenty-three borough constituencies, the City of London and the Universities of Oxford, Cambridge and Dublin) meaning the seat saw a reduction of the number of its members.

The death of Roger Stott in office in 1999 made him the fourth Wigan MP in the twentieth century to die in office (uniquely for a constituency in the United Kingdom); the others were John Parkinson, Ronald Williams and William Foster.

=== Political history ===
Wigan is considered a safe seat given that it has been held by the Labour Party since 1918, with vote shares ranging from 46.7% in 2019 to 72.9% in 1966.

=== Prominent frontbenchers ===
Member of Parliament	Notability
William Ewart	Carried the Hanging in Chains Act 1834, abolishing hanging in chains; Carried a bill in 1837 to abolish capital punishment for cattle-stealing and similar offences; Carried the Public Libraries Act 1850, establishing free libraries supported out of public rates; Instrumental in the passage of the Metric Weights and Measures Act 1864
Algernon Egerton	Parliamentary Secretary to the Admiralty (1874–80)
Alan Fitch	Vice-Chamberlain of the Household (1968–70)
Roger Stott	Joint Chairman of the Council for Arab-British Understanding; Parliamentary Private Secretary to James Callaghan (1976–79)
Lisa Nandy	Secretary of State for Culture, Media and Sport under Keir Starmer; 2020 Labour Party leadership election contender who placed third.

== Boundaries ==
1832–1918: The Township of Wigan.

- In 1835 Wigan became a Municipal borough, using the then current Parliamentary boundaries of the Township.
- In 1888 Wigan Municipal Borough became the County Borough of Wigan on the same boundaries.
- In 1904 Pemberton Urban District was dissolved, with the area covered by it becoming part of the County Borough of Wigan. However, for Parliamentary purposes, that area remained part of South-West Lancashire, Ince Division until the Parliamentary boundaries were redefined in 1918.

1918–1983: The County Borough of Wigan

- In 1974 the County Borough of Wigan was abolished and superseded by the Metropolitan Borough of Wigan, covering a far greater area. However, the boundary of the Parliamentary Constituency of Wigan remained unchanged until 1983, when it was expanded to cover the northern part of the Metropolitan Borough.

1983–1997: The Metropolitan Borough of Wigan wards of Aspull-Standish, Beech Hill, Ince, Langtree, Newtown, Norley, Swinley, Whelley.

1997–2010: The Metropolitan Borough of Wigan wards of Aspull-Standish, Beech Hill, Langtree, Newtown, Norley, Swinley, Whelley.

- In 2004, new ward boundaries in the Metropolitan Borough of Wigan came in to effect. However, the Parliamentary boundaries remained unchanged until they were reviewed and adjusted to line up with the new ward boundaries in 2010.

2010–present: The Metropolitan Borough of Wigan wards of Aspull, New Springs and Whelley; Douglas; Ince; Pemberton; Shevington with Lower Ground; Standish with Langtree; Wigan Central; Wigan West.

- The 2023 review of Westminster constituencies, which was based on the ward structure in place at 1 December 2020, left the boundaries unchanged.

== Constituency profile ==
The seat is productive and has excellent links to Manchester, as well as close links to the M6, which lies just within its western border. However, over the past century, Wigan has witnessed a fall in manufacturing, particularly in the production of textiles, which have been unable to compete with the Indian subcontinent and the Far East. Another industry which has suffered is coal mining, which had been a large employer in this part of Lancashire up until the mid-20th century. There are some industrial areas remaining in and around the town centre. The Leeds and Liverpool Canal flows through the town, including the famous Wigan Pier area.

As of May 2018, the rate of JSA and Universal Credit claimants was 3.9%, higher than the national average of 2.8% and regional average of 3.7%, based on a statistical compilation by the House of Commons Library. The constituency also includes more desirable semi-rural residential villages to the north of Wigan town centre, such as Standish, which are relatively more affluent.

== Members of Parliament ==
=== MPs 1295–1640 ===
Parliament	First member	Second member
1295	William le Teinterer	Henry le Bocher
1306–7 (Jan)	Simon Payer	John de Mersee
1307–1545	No Members returned to Parliament	
1545	Thomas Chaloner	John Eston
1547 (Nov)	Alexander Barlowe	Thomas Carus
1552–3 (Mar)	Alexander Barlowe	Gilbert Gerard
1553 (Oct)	Alexander Barlowe	Gilbert Gerard
1554 (Apr)	Alexander Barlowe	William Barnes
1554 (Nov)	Alexander Barlowe	John Barnes
1555	Alexander Barlowe	Gilbert Gerard
1558	Ralph Barton	Thomas Smith
1559 (Jan)	William Gerard II	Thomas Bromley
1562–3 (Mar)	William Gerard II	John Ratcliffe
1571	William Gerard II	Owen Ratcliffe
1572	Edward Fitton (the younger) on Queen's Service and repl. 1581 by Richard Molyneux	Edward Elrington
1584 (Nov)	Thomas Grimsditch	William Gerard III
1586	William Gerard III	Peter Legh
1588 (Dec)	Peter Legh	William Leycester
1593	William Gerard III	Michael Heneage
1597 (Oct)	Edward Legh	Nicholas Smyth
1601 (Oct)	Roger Downes	John Pulteney
1604	Sir William Cooke	Sir John Pulteney
1614	Sir Gilbert Gerard	Sir Richard Molyneux
1621	Sir Thomas Gerard, 1st Baronet (died and replaced 1621 by George Garrard)	Roger Downes
1624	Sir Anthony St John	Francis Downes
1625	Francis Downes	Edward Bridgeman
1626	Sir Anthony St John	Sir William Pooley
1628	Edward Bridgeman	Sir Anthony St John
1629–1640	No Parliaments convened	

=== MPs 1640–1885 ===
Year	First member	First party	Second member	Second party
April 1640	Orlando Bridgeman	Royalist	Alexander Rigby	Parliamentarian
November 1640	Orlando Bridgeman	Royalist	Alexander Rigby	Parliamentarian
May 1642	Bridgeman expelled – seat vacant		Alexander Rigby	Parliamentarian
1646	John Holcroft		Alexander Rigby	Parliamentarian
December 1648	Holcroft excluded in Pride's Purge – seat vacant		Alexander Rigby	Parliamentarian
August 1650	Holcroft excluded in Pride's Purge – seat vacant		Rigby died – seat vacant	
1653	Wigan was unrepresented in the Barebones Parliament and the First and Second Parliaments of the Protectorate			
January 1659	Robert Markland		Hugh Forth	
May 1659	Not represented in the restored Rump			
April 1660	William Gardiner		Hugh Forth	
October 1660	John Molyneux		Roger Stoughton	
1661	The Earl of Ancram		Geoffrey Shakerley	
February 1679	The Earl of Ancram		Roger Bradshaigh	
September 1679	The Earl of Ancram		William Banks	
1681	The Earl of Ancram		Viscount Colchester	
1685	The Earl of Ancram		Lord Charles Murray	
1689	Sir Edward Chisenhall		William Banks	
1690	Sir Richard Standish		Peter Shakerley	
1694	John Byrom		Peter Shakerley	
1695	Sir Roger Bradshaigh	Tory	Peter Shakerley	
1698	Sir Roger Bradshaigh	Tory	Orlando Bridgeman	
1701	Sir Roger Bradshaigh	Tory	Sir Alexander Rigby	
1702	Sir Roger Bradshaigh	Tory	Orlando Bridgeman	
1705	Sir Roger Bradshaigh	Tory	Brigadier Emanuel Howe	Whig
1708	Sir Roger Bradshaigh	Tory	Major Henry Bradshaigh	
1713	Sir Roger Bradshaigh	Tory	George Kenyon	
1715	Sir Roger Bradshaigh	Tory	The Earl of Barrymore	
1727	Sir Roger Bradshaigh	Tory	Peter Bold	Tory
1734	Sir Roger Bradshaigh	Tory	The Earl of Barrymore	
March 1747	Richard Clayton		The Earl of Barrymore	
June 1747	Richard Clayton		Hon. Richard Barry	
1754	Sir William Meredith	Tory	Hon. Richard Barry	
1761	Fletcher Norton		Simon Luttrell	
1768	George Byng		Beaumont Hotham	
1775	George Byng		John Morton	Tory
August 1780	George Byng		Henry Simpson Bridgeman	
September 1780	Hon. Horatio Walpole	Tory	Henry Simpson Bridgeman	
1782	Hon. Horatio Walpole	Tory	John Cotes	Tory
1784	Orlando Bridgeman (Note: The Honourable Orlando Bridgeman from 1796)	Tory	John Cotes	Tory
1800	George Gunning		John Cotes	Tory
1802	John Hodson	Tory	Sir Robert Holt Leigh	Tory
1820	James Alexander Hodson	Tory	Lord Lindsay	Tory
1825	James Alexander Hodson	Tory	Lieutenant-Colonel James Lindsay	Tory
March 1831	John Hodson Kearsley	Tory	Lieutenant-Colonel James Lindsay	Tory
May 1831	John Hodson Kearsley	Tory	Ralph Thicknesse	Whig
1832	Richard Potter	Radical	Ralph Thicknesse	Whig
1835	Richard Potter	Radical	John Hodson Kearsley	Conservative
1837	Richard Potter	Radical	Charles Strickland Standish	Whig
1839	William Ewart	Radical	Charles Strickland Standish	Whig
1841	Peter Greenall	Conservative	Thomas Bright Crosse (Note: On petition, the election of Crosse was declared void and after scrutiny of the votes his opponent, Standish, was declared duly elected.)	Conservative
1842	Peter Greenall	Conservative	Charles Strickland Standish	Whig
1845	Hon. James Lindsay	Conservative	Charles Strickland Standish	Whig
1847	Hon. James Lindsay	Conservative	Ralph Anthony Thicknesse	Whig
1854	Hon. James Lindsay	Conservative	Joseph Acton	Whig
1857	Francis Powell	Conservative	Henry Woods	Whig
1859	Hon. James Lindsay	Conservative	Henry Woods	Liberal
1866	Nathaniel Eckersley	Conservative	Henry Woods	Liberal
1868	John Lancaster	Liberal	Henry Woods	Liberal
1874	Lord Lindsay	Conservative	Thomas Knowles	Conservative
1881	Francis Powell (Note: On petition, Powell's election was declared void and the writ was suspended. The following year a new writ was issued and a by-election was held)	Conservative	Thomas Knowles	Conservative
1881	Writ suspended following corrupt election – seat vacant		Thomas Knowles	Conservative
December 1882	Hon. Algernon Egerton	Conservative	Thomas Knowles	Conservative
1883	Hon. Algernon Egerton	Conservative	Nathaniel Eckersley	Conservative
1885	Representation reduced to one member			

=== MPs since 1885 ===
Election	Member	Party
1885	Sir Francis Powell	Conservative
1910 (January)	Henry Twist	Labour
1910 (December)	Reginald Neville	Conservative
1918	John Parkinson	Labour
1942 by-election	William Foster	Labour
1948 by-election	Ronald Williams	Labour
1958 by-election	Alan Fitch	Labour
1983	Roger Stott	Labour
1999 by-election	Neil Turner	Labour
2010	Lisa Nandy	Labour

== Elections ==
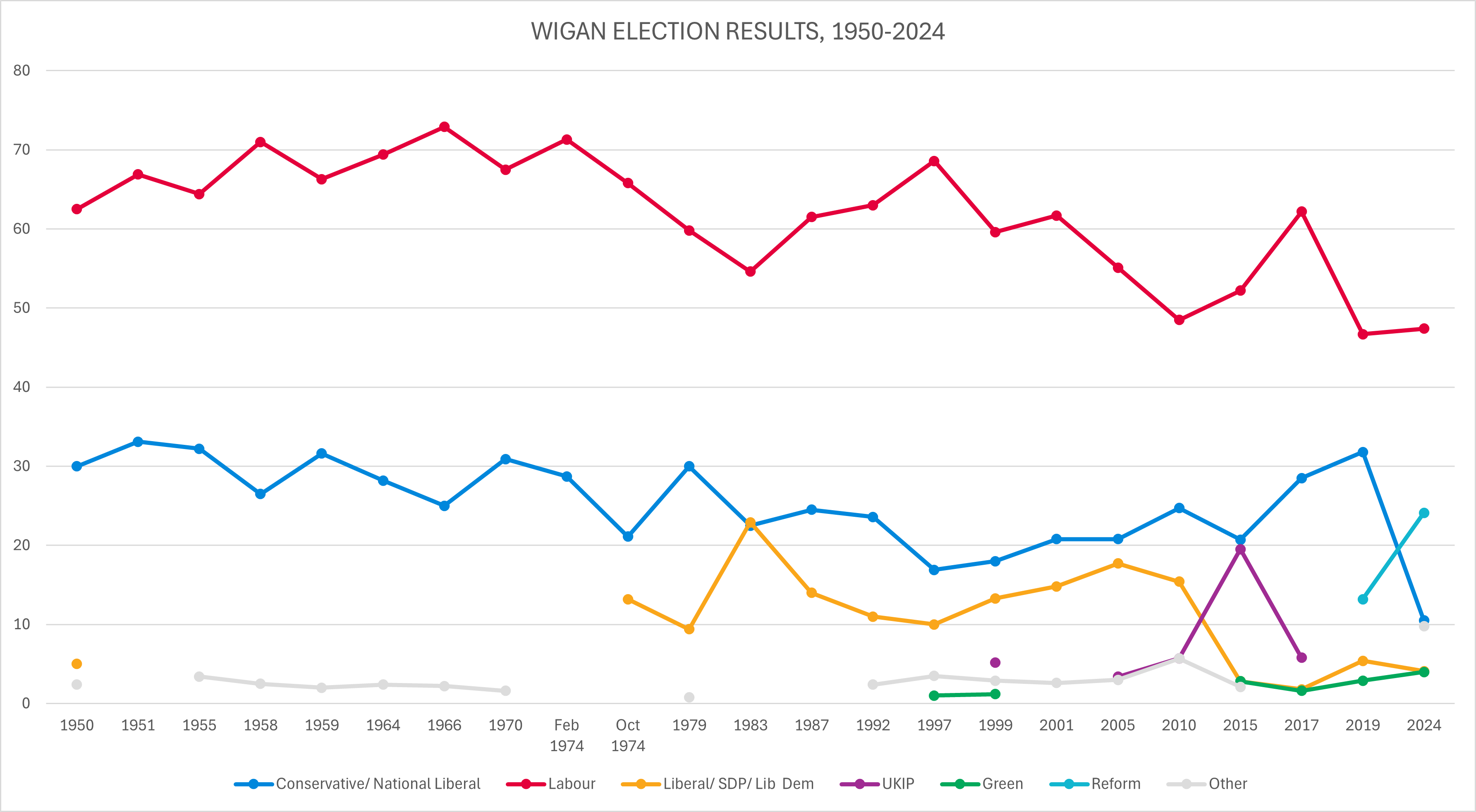
Election results 1950–2024

=== Elections in the 2020s ===
General election 2024: Wigan
Party	Candidate	Votes	%	±%
Labour	Lisa Nandy	19,401	47.4	▲0.7
Reform	Andy Dawber	9,852	24.1	▲10.9
Conservative	Henry Mitson	4,310	10.5	▼21.3
Independent	Maureen O'Bern	3,522	8.6	N/A
Liberal Democrats	Brian Crombie-Fisher	1,692	4.1	▼1.3
Green	Jane Leicester	1,629	4.0	▲1.1
Independent	Jan Cunliffe	406	1.0	N/A
Independent	The Zok	87	0.2	N/A
Majority		9,549	23.3	▲8.4
Turnout		40,899	52.9	▼6.6
Registered electors		77,538		
Labour hold		Swing	▼5.1	

=== Elections in the 2010s ===
General election 2019: Wigan
Party	Candidate	Votes	%	±%
Labour	Lisa Nandy	21,042	46.7	▼15.5
Conservative	Ashley Williams	14,314	31.8	▲3.3
Brexit Party	William Malloy	5,959	13.2	N/A
Liberal Democrats	Stuart Thomas	2,428	5.4	▲3.6
Green	Peter Jacobs	1,299	2.9	▲1.3
Majority		6,728	14.9	▼18.8
Turnout		45,042	59.5	▼3.1
Labour hold		Swing	▼9.4	

General election 2017: Wigan
Party	Candidate	Votes	%	±%
Labour	Lisa Nandy	29,575	62.2	▲10.0
Conservative	Alex Williams	13,548	28.5	▲7.8
UKIP	Nathan Ryding	2,750	5.8	▼13.7
Liberal Democrats	Mark Clayton	916	1.8	▼1.0
Green	Will Patterson	753	1.6	▼1.2
Majority		16,027	33.7	▲2.2
Turnout		47,542	62.6	▲3.1
Labour hold		Swing	▲1.1	

General election 2015: Wigan
Party	Candidate	Votes	%	±%
Labour	Lisa Nandy	23,625	52.2	▲3.7
Conservative	Caroline Kerswell	9,389	20.7	▼4.0
UKIP	Mark Bradley	8,818	19.5	▲13.8
Green	Will Patterson	1,273	2.8	N/A
Liberal Democrats	Mark Clayton	1,255	2.8	▼12.6
Wigan Independents	Gareth Fairhurst	768	1.7	N/A
Independent	Brian Parr	165	0.4	N/A
Majority		14,236	31.5	▲7.7
Turnout		45,293	59.5	▲1.1
Labour hold		Swing	▲3.9	

General election 2010: Wigan
Party	Candidate	Votes	%	±%
Labour	Lisa Nandy	21,404	48.5	▼9.6
Conservative	Michael Winstanley	10,917	24.7	▲5.8
Liberal Democrats	Mark Clayton	6,797	15.4	▼1.5
UKIP	Alan Freeman	2,516	5.7	▲2.3
BNP	Charles Mather	2,506	5.7	N/A
Majority		10,487	23.8	▼10.5
Turnout		44,140	58.4	▲6.3
Labour hold		Swing	▼7.7	

=== Elections in the 2000s ===
General election 2005: Wigan
Party	Candidate	Votes	%	±%
Labour	Neil Turner	18,901	55.1	▼6.6
Conservative	John Coombes	7,134	20.8	0.0
Liberal Democrats	Denise Capstick	6,051	17.7	▲2.9
UKIP	John Whittaker	1,166	3.4	N/A
Community Action	Kevin Williams	1,026	3.0	N/A
Majority		11,767	34.3	▼6.6
Turnout		34,278	53.3	▼0.8
Labour hold		Swing	▼3.3	

General election 2001: Wigan
Party	Candidate	Votes	%	±%
Labour	Neil Turner	20,739	61.7	▼6.9
Conservative	Mark Page	6,996	20.8	▲3.9
Liberal Democrats	Trevor Beswick	4,970	14.8	▲4.8
Socialist Alliance	Dave Lowe	886	2.6	N/A
Majority		13,743	40.9	▼10.8
Turnout		33,591	52.5	▼15.2
Labour hold		Swing	▼5.4	

=== Elections in the 1990s ===
1999 Wigan by-election
Party	Candidate	Votes	%	±%
Labour	Neil Turner	9,641	59.6	▼9.0
Conservative	Tom Peet	2,912	18.0	▲1.1
Liberal Democrats	Jonathan Rule	2,148	13.3	▲3.3
UKIP	John Whittaker	834	5.2	N/A
Socialist Labour	William Kelly	240	1.5	N/A
Green	Chris Maile	190	1.2	▲0.2
National Democrats	Stephen Ebbs	100	0.6	N/A
Natural Law	Paul Davis	64	0.4	▲0.2
Independent	David Braid	58	0.4	N/A
Majority		6,729	41.6	▼10.1
Turnout		16,187	25.0	▼42.7
Labour hold		Swing	▼5.0	

General election 1997: Wigan
Party	Candidate	Votes	%	±%
Labour	Roger Stott	30,043	68.6	▲5.6
Conservative	Mark Loveday	7,400	16.9	▼6.7
Liberal Democrats	Trevor Beswick	4,390	10.0	▼1.0
Referendum	Anthony Bradborne	1,450	3.3	N/A
Green	Christopher Maile	442	1.0	N/A
Natural Law	William Ayliffe	94	0.2	▼0.2
Majority		22,643	51.7	▲12.3
Turnout		43,819	67.7	▼8.5
Labour hold		Swing	▲6.2	

General election 1992: Wigan
Party	Candidate	Votes	%	±%
Labour	Roger Stott	34,910	63.0	▲1.5
Conservative	Edward Hess	13,068	23.6	▼0.9
Liberal Democrats	George Davies	6,111	11.0	▼3.0
Liberal	Kevin White	1,116	2.0	▼12.0
Natural Law	Annie Tayler	197	0.4	N/A
Majority		21,842	39.4	▲2.3
Turnout		55,402	76.2	▼0.4
Labour hold		Swing	▲1.2	

=== Elections in the 1980s ===
General election 1987: Wigan
Party	Candidate	Votes	%	±%
Labour	Roger Stott	33,955	61.5	▲6.9
Conservative	Kenneth Wade	13,493	24.5	▲2.0
Liberal	Kevin White	7,732	14.0	▼8.9
Majority		20,462	37.0	▲5.3
Turnout		55,179	76.6	▲1.0
Labour hold		Swing	▲7.9	

General election 1983: Wigan
Party	Candidate	Votes	%	±%
Labour	Roger Stott	29,859	54.6	▼5.2
Liberal	John Piggott	12,554	22.9	▲13.5
Conservative	Henry Cadman	12,320	22.5	▼7.5
Majority		17,305	31.7	▲1.9
Turnout		54,734	75.6	▲1.5
Labour hold		Swing	▼1.2	

=== Elections in the 1970s ===
General election 1979: Wigan
Party	Candidate	Votes	%	±%
Labour	Alan Fitch	26,144	59.8	▼6.0
Conservative	Thomas Peet	13,149	30.0	▲8.9
Liberal	K Bruce	4,102	9.4	▼3.8
Workers Revolutionary	A Smith	348	0.8	N/A
Majority		12,995	29.8	▼14.9
Turnout		43,742	74.1	▲0.1
Labour hold		Swing	▼7.5	

General election October 1974: Wigan
Party	Candidate	Votes	%	±%
Labour	Alan Fitch	27,692	65.8	▼5.5
Conservative	PM Beard	8,865	21.1	▼7.6
Liberal	J Campbell	5,548	13.2	N/A
Majority		18,827	44.7	▲2.1
Turnout		42,105	74.0	▼1.8
Labour hold		Swing	▼1.1	

General election February 1974: Wigan
Party	Candidate	Votes	%	±%
Labour	Alan Fitch	30,485	71.3	▲3.8
Conservative	P Beard	12,283	28.7	▼2.2
Majority		18,202	42.6	▲6.0
Turnout		42,766	75.8	▲3.5
Labour hold		Swing	▲3.0	

General election 1970: Wigan
Party	Candidate	Votes	%	±%
Labour	Alan Fitch	28,102	67.5	▼5.4
Conservative	Anthony Daniels	12,882	30.9	▲5.9
Communist	Jack Kay	672	1.6	▼0.6
Majority		15,220	36.6	▼11.3
Turnout		41,655	72.3	▼3.5
Labour hold		Swing	▼5.7	

=== Elections in the 1960s ===
General election 1966: Wigan
Party	Candidate	Votes	%	±%
Labour	Alan Fitch	28,754	72.9	▲3.5
Conservative	Malcolm Kingston	9,876	25.0	▼3.2
Communist	Michael Weaver	858	2.2	▼0.2
Majority		18,878	47.9	▲6.7
Turnout		42,766	75.8	▼3.6
Labour hold		Swing	▲3.4	

General election 1964: Wigan
Party	Candidate	Votes	%	±%
Labour	Alan Fitch	28,640	69.4	▲3.1
Conservative	Ian K Paley	11,648	28.2	▼3.4
Communist	Michael Weaver	988	2.4	▲0.4
Majority		16,992	41.2	▲6.5
Turnout		41,276	79.4	▼4.4
Labour hold		Swing	▲3.3	

=== Elections in the 1950s ===
General election 1959: Wigan
Party	Candidate	Votes	%	±%
Labour	Alan Fitch	30,664	66.3	▲1.9
Conservative	John Hodgson	14,615	31.6	▼0.6
Communist	Michael Weaver	945	2.0	▼1.4
Majority		16,049	34.7	▲2.5
Turnout		46,224	83.8	▲3.5
Labour hold		Swing	▲1.3	

1958 Wigan by-election
Party	Candidate	Votes	%	±%
Labour	Alan Fitch	27,415	71.0	▲6.6
Conservative	John Hodgson	10,248	26.5	▼5.7
Communist	Michael Weaver	972	2.5	▼0.9
Majority		17,167	44.5	▲12.3
Turnout		38,635		
Labour hold		Swing	▲6.2	

General election 1955: Wigan
Party	Candidate	Votes	%	±%
Labour	Ronald Williams	29,755	64.4	▼2.5
Conservative	Harold D Lowe	14,883	32.2	▼0.9
Communist	Thomas Rowlandson	1,567	3.4	N/A
Majority		14,872	32.2	▼1.6
Turnout		46,205	80.3	▼6.7
Labour hold		Swing	▼0.8	

General election 1951: Wigan
Party	Candidate	Votes	%	±%
Labour	Ronald Williams	34,530	66.9	▲4.4
Conservative	Dennis C Walls	17,078	33.1	▲3.1
Majority		17,452	33.8	▲1.3
Turnout		51,608	87.0	▼2.3
Labour hold		Swing	▲0.7	

General election 1950: Wigan
Party	Candidate	Votes	%	±%
Labour	Ronald Williams	32,746	62.5	▼5.7
Conservative	Harold Dowling	15,733	30.0	▼1.8
Liberal	Ian Webster	2,651	5.0	N/A
Communist	Thomas Rowlandson	1,243	2.4	N/A
Majority		17,013	32.5	▼3.9
Turnout		52,373	89.3	▲8.9
Labour hold		Swing	▼2.0	

=== Elections in the 1940s ===
1948 Wigan by-election
Party	Candidate	Votes	%	±%
Labour	Ronald Williams	28,941	59.1	▼9.1
Conservative	Harold Dowling	17,466	35.6	▲3.8
Communist	Thomas Rowlandson	1,647	3.7	N/A
King's Cavalier	Owen L Roberts	932	1.6	N/A
Majority		11,475	23.4	▼12.9
Turnout		48,986		
Labour hold		Swing	▼6.5	

General election 1945: Wigan
Party	Candidate	Votes	%	±%
Labour	William Foster	31,392	68.2	▲6.9
Conservative	Evelyn Charles Lacy Hulbert-Powell	14,666	31.8	▼6.9
Majority		16,726	36.4	▲13.8
Turnout		46,058	80.4	▼1.3
Labour hold		Swing	▲6.9	

1942 Wigan by-election
Party	Candidate	Votes	%	±%
Labour	William Foster	Unopposed		
Labour hold				

=== Elections in the 1930s ===
General election 1935: Wigan
Party	Candidate	Votes	%	±%
Labour	John Parkinson	27,950	61.3	▲10.2
Conservative	Robert Grant-Ferris	17,646	38.7	▼10.2
Majority		10,304	22.6	▲20.4
Turnout		45,596	81.7	▼2.5
Labour hold		Swing	▲10.2	

General election 1931: Wigan
Party	Candidate	Votes	%	±%
Labour	John Parkinson	23,544	51.1	▼7.4
Conservative	Geoffrey Dorling Roberts	22,526	48.9	▲10.2
Majority		1,018	2.2	▼17.6
Turnout		46,070	84.2	▼2.7
Labour hold		Swing	▼8.8	

=== Elections in the 1920s ===
General election 1929: Wigan
Party	Candidate	Votes	%	±%
Labour	John Parkinson	27,462	58.5	▲0.9
Unionist	Ernest Barlow	18,144	38.7	▼3.7
Communist	Frank Bright	1,307	2.8	N/A
Majority		9,318	19.8	▲4.6
Turnout		46,913	86.9	▼1.0
Registered electors		54,008		
Labour hold		Swing	▲2.3	

General election 1924: Wigan
Party	Candidate	Votes	%	±%
Labour	John Parkinson	20,350	57.6	0.0
Unionist	David Maxwell Fyfe	15,006	42.4	0.0
Majority		5,344	15.2	0.0
Turnout		35,356	87.9	▲2.9
Registered electors		40,217		
Labour hold		Swing	0.0	

General election 1923: Wigan
Party	Candidate	Votes	%	±%
Labour	John Parkinson	19,637	57.6	▲1.1
Unionist	David Lindsay	14,451	42.4	▼1.1
Majority		5,186	15.2	▲2.2
Turnout		34,088	85.0	▼3.9
Registered electors		40,105		
Labour hold		Swing	▲1.1	

General election 1922: Wigan
Party	Candidate	Votes	%	±%
Labour	John Parkinson	20,079	56.5	▲8.5
Unionist	Albert Edward Baucher	15,436	43.5	▲0.5
Majority		4,643	13.0	▲8.0
Turnout		35,515	88.9	▲19.5
Registered electors		39,929		
Labour hold		Swing	▲4.0	

=== Elections in the 1910s ===
General election 1918: Wigan
Party		Candidate	Votes	%	±%
	Labour	John Parkinson	12,914	48.0	▲1.2
C	Unionist	Reginald Neville	11,584	43.0	▼10.2
	Liberal	Robert Alstead	2,434	9.0	N/A
Majority			1,330	5.0	N/A
Turnout			26,932	69.4	▼22.3
Registered electors			38,811		
	Labour gain from Unionist		Swing	▲5.7	
C indicates candidate endorsed by the coalition government.

General Election 1914–15:

Another General Election was required to take place before the end of 1915. The political parties had been making preparations for an election to take place and by July 1914, the following candidates had been selected;

- Unionist: Reginald Neville
- Labour: Henry Twist

General election December 1910: Wigan
Party	Candidate	Votes	%	±%
Conservative	Reginald Neville	4,673	53.2	▲6.0
Labour	Henry Twist	4,110	46.8	▼6.0
Majority		563	6.4	N/A
Turnout		8,783	91.7	▼3.3
Conservative gain from Labour		Swing	▲6.0	

General election January 1910: Wigan
Party	Candidate	Votes	%	±%
Labour	Henry Twist	4,803	52.8	N/A
Conservative	Reginald Neville	4,293	47.2	▲0.6
Majority		510	5.6	N/A
Turnout		9,096	95.0	▲7.8
Labour gain from Conservative		Swing		

=== Elections in the 1900s ===
General election 1906: Wigan
Party	Candidate	Votes	%	±%
Conservative	Francis Powell	3,573	46.6	▼8.1
Independent Labour	Thorley Smith (Note: Nominee of the Lancashire and Cheshire Women's Textile and Other Workers Representation Committee)	2,205	28.7	N/A
Liberal	William Woods	1,900	24.7	▼20.6
Majority		1,368	17.9	▲8.5
Turnout		7,678	87.2	▲1.6
Registered electors		8,804		
Conservative hold		Swing	▲6.3	

General election 1900: Wigan
Party	Candidate	Votes	%	±%
Conservative	Francis Powell	3,772	54.7	▼1.5
Liberal	William Woods	3,130	45.3	▲1.5
Majority		642	9.4	▼3.0
Turnout		6,902	85.6	▼3.7
Registered electors		8,059		
Conservative hold		Swing	▼1.5	

=== Elections in the 1890s ===
General election 1895: Wigan
Party	Candidate	Votes	%	±%
Conservative	Francis Powell	3,949	56.2	▲5.4
Lib-Lab	Thomas Aspinwall	3,075	43.8	▼5.4
Majority		874	12.4	▲10.8
Turnout		7,024	89.3	▼1.8
Registered electors		7,864		
Conservative hold		Swing	▲5.4	

General election 1892: Wigan
Party	Candidate	Votes	%	±%
Conservative	Francis Powell	3,422	50.8	▼4.0
Lib-Lab	Thomas Aspinwall	3,312	49.2	▲4.0
Majority		110	1.6	▼8.0
Turnout		6,734	91.1	▲3.1
Registered electors		7,390		
Conservative hold		Swing	▼4.0	

=== Elections in the 1880s ===
General election 1886: Wigan
Party	Candidate	Votes	%	±%
Conservative	Francis Powell	3,371	54.8	▼2.4
Liberal	Cornelius McLeod Percy	2,780	45.2	▲2.4
Majority		591	9.6	▼4.8
Turnout		6,151	88.0	▼3.0
Registered electors		6,988		
Conservative hold		Swing	▼2.4	

General election 1885: Wigan
Party	Candidate	Votes	%	±%
Conservative	Francis Powell	3,637	57.2	▲5.7
Liberal	George Harris Lea (judge)	2,721	42.8	▼5.8
Majority		916	14.4	▲14.1
Turnout		6,358	91.0	▼2.1 (est)
Registered electors		6,988		
Conservative hold		Swing	▲5.8	

By-election, 21 Dec 1883: Wigan (1 seat)
Party	Candidate	Votes	%	±%
Conservative	Nathaniel Eckersley	Unopposed		
Conservative hold				

- Caused by Knowles' death.

By-election, 4 Dec 1882: Wigan (1 seat)
Party	Candidate	Votes	%	±%
Conservative	Algernon Egerton	2,867	56.1	▲4.6
Liberal	Walter Wren	2,243	43.9	▼4.7
Majority		624	12.2	▲11.9
Turnout		5,110	83.8	▼9.3 (est)
Registered electors		6,097		
Conservative hold		Swing	▲4.7	

- Caused by the previous election being declared void on petition.

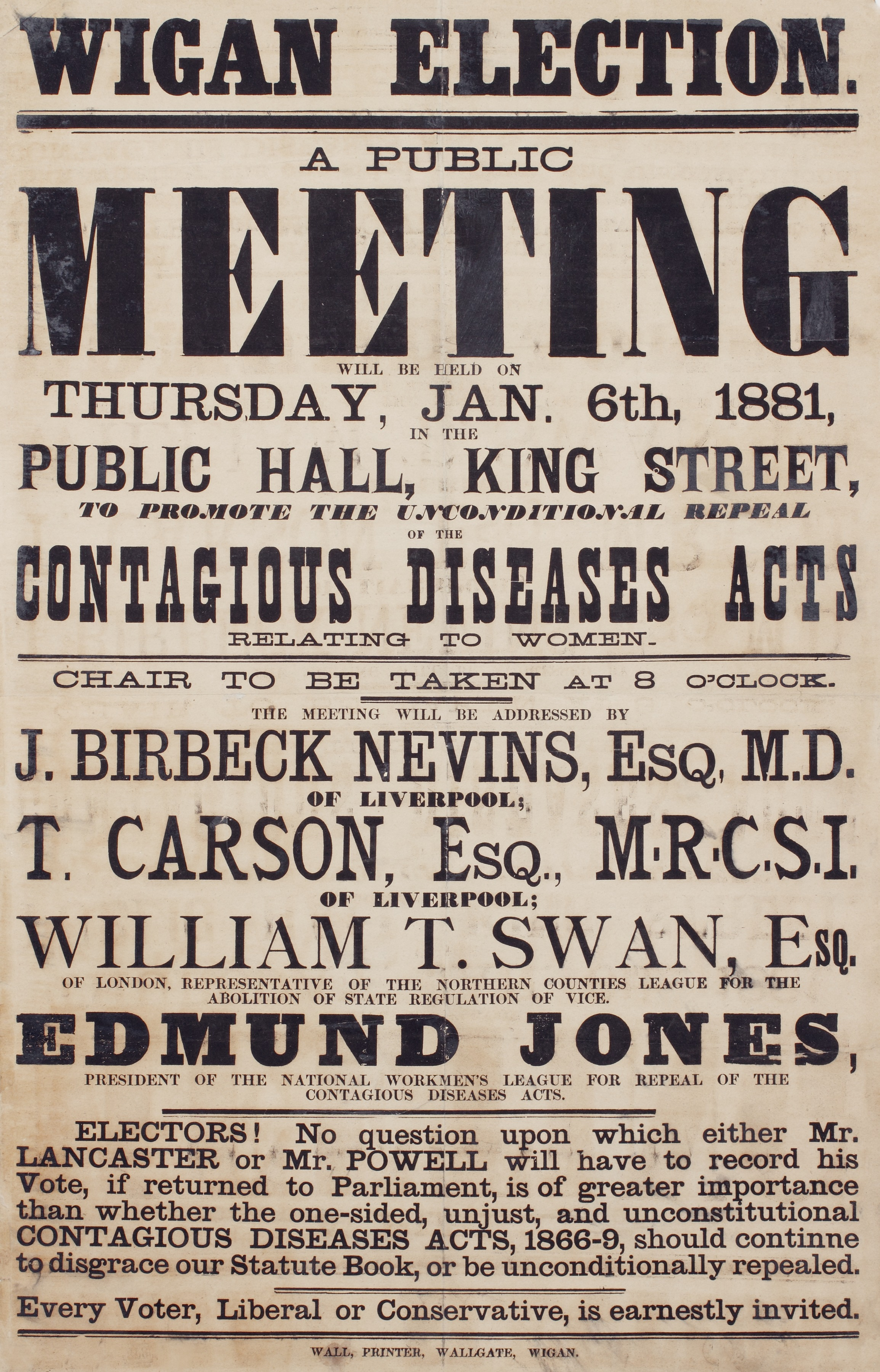
Poster printed during the 1881 Wigan by-election campaign, announcing a public meeting calling for the repeal of the Contagious Diseases Acts.

By-election, 20 Jan 1881: Wigan (1 seat)
Party	Candidate	Votes	%	±%
Conservative	Francis Powell	3,005	54.2	▲2.7
Liberal	John Lancaster	2,536	45.8	▼2.8
Majority		469	8.4	▲8.1
Turnout		5,541	93.3	▲0.2 (est)
Registered electors		5,937		
Conservative hold		Swing	▼2.8	

- Caused by Lindsay's elevation to the peerage, becoming Earl of Crawford and Balcarres. This by-election was later voided on petition.

General election 1880: Wigan (2 seats)
Party	Candidate	Votes	%	±%
Conservative	Lord Lindsay	2,946	25.9	▼2.0
Conservative	Thomas Knowles	2,913	25.6	▼1.3
Liberal	John Lancaster	2,880	25.3	▲4.2
Liberal	George McCorquodale	2,653	23.3	▲11.8
Majority		33	0.3	▼5.5
Turnout		5,696 (est)	93.1 (est)	▲4.8
Registered electors		6,120		
Conservative hold		Swing	▼3.1	
Conservative hold		Swing	▼6.6	

=== Elections in the 1870s ===
General election 1874: Wigan (2 seats)
Party	Candidate	Votes	%	±%
Conservative	James Lindsay	2,493	27.9	▲4.4
Conservative	Thomas Knowles	2,401	26.9	▲4.0
Liberal	John Lancaster	1,883	21.1	▼5.4
Lib-Lab	William Pickard	1,134	12.7	N/A
Liberal	Henry Woods	1,029	11.5	▼15.6
Majority		518	5.8	N/A
Turnout		4,470 (est)	88.3 (est)	▲5.5
Registered electors		5,062		
Conservative gain from Liberal		Swing	▲7.5	
Conservative gain from Liberal		Swing	▲7.3	

=== Elections in the 1860s ===
General election 1868: Wigan (2 seats)
Party	Candidate	Votes	%	±%
Liberal	Henry Woods	2,219	27.1	N/A
Liberal	John Lancaster	2,166	26.5	N/A
Conservative	Nathaniel Eckersley	1,920	23.5	N/A
Conservative	John Pearson	1,875	22.9	N/A
Majority		246	3.0	N/A
Turnout		4,090 (est)	82.8 (est)	N/A
Registered electors		4,939		
Liberal hold		Swing	N/A	
Liberal gain from Conservative		Swing	N/A	

By-election, 27 March 1866: Wigan
Party	Candidate	Votes	%	±%
Conservative	Nathaniel Eckersley	411	54.1	N/A
Liberal	John Lancaster	349	45.9	N/A
Majority		62	8.2	N/A
Turnout		760	88.1	N/A
Registered electors		863		
Conservative hold		Swing	N/A	

- Caused by Lindsay's resignation due to prolonged service in Canada in the British Army.

General election 1865: Wigan
Party	Candidate	Votes	%	±%
Conservative	James Lindsay	Unopposed		
Liberal	Henry Woods	Unopposed		
Registered electors		863		
Conservative hold				
Liberal hold				

=== Elections in the 1850s ===
General election 1859: Wigan (2 seats)
Party	Candidate	Votes	%	±%
Conservative	James Lindsay	500	40.0	▲15.2
Liberal	Henry Woods	476	38.1	▲2.3
Conservative	Francis Powell	273	21.9	▼17.5
Turnout		625 (est)	74.8 (est)	▼4.5
Registered electors		835		
Majority		24	1.9	▼1.7
Conservative hold		Swing	▲7.0	
Majority		203	16.2	▲5.2
Liberal hold		Swing	▲2.3	

General election 1857: Wigan (2 seats)
Party	Candidate	Votes	%	±%
Conservative	Francis Powell	492	39.4	▲8.4
Whig	Henry Woods	447	35.8	▲0.8
Conservative	James Lindsay	309	24.8	▼9.2
Turnout		624 (est)	78.3 (est)	▲5.5
Registered electors		797		
Majority		45	3.6	N/A
Conservative hold		Swing	▲4.0	
Majority		138	11.0	▲7.0
Whig hold		Swing	▲0.8	

By-election, 3 October 1854: Wigan
Party	Candidate	Votes	%	±%
Whig	Joseph Acton	339	50.4	▲15.4
Conservative	Francis Powell	334	49.6	▼15.4
Majority		5	0.8	▼3.2
Turnout		673	85.4	▲12.6
Registered electors		788		
Whig hold		Swing	▲15.4	

- Caused by Thicknesse's death.

General election 1852: Wigan (2 seats)
Party	Candidate	Votes	%	±%
Whig	Ralph Anthony Thicknesse	366	35.0	N/A
Conservative	James Lindsay	356	34.0	N/A
Conservative	Francis Powell	324	31.0	N/A
Majority		42	4.0	N/A
Turnout		523 (est)	72.8 (est)	N/A
Registered electors		797		
Whig hold		Swing	N/A	
Conservative hold		Swing	N/A	

=== Elections in the 1840s ===
General election 1847: Wigan (2 seats)
Party	Candidate	Votes	%	±%
Conservative	James Lindsay	Unopposed		
Whig	Ralph Anthony Thicknesse	Unopposed		
Registered electors		637		
Conservative hold				
Whig gain from Conservative				

By-election, 16 October 1845: Wigan
Party	Candidate	Votes	%	±%
Conservative	James Lindsay	274	56.5	▲5.8
Whig	Ralph Anthony Thicknesse	211	43.5	▼5.8
Majority		63	13.0	▲12.6
Turnout		485	93.8	▲2.3
Registered electors		517		
Conservative hold		Swing	▲5.8	

- Caused by Greenall's death.

After the 1841 election, Crosse was unseated on petition and Standish was declared elected in his place on 11 April 1842.

General election 1841: Wigan (2 seats)
Party	Candidate	Votes	%	±%
Conservative	Peter Greenall	273	25.6	▲1.1
Conservative	Thomas Bright Crosse	268	25.1	▲2.5
Whig	Charles Strickland Standish	264	24.7	▲11.4
Whig	Charles Grenfell	263	24.6	▲11.3
Majority		4	0.4	N/A
Turnout		536	91.5	▲4.5
Registered electors		586		
Conservative gain from Whig		Swing	▼5.1	
Conservative gain from Radical		Swing	▼4.4	

=== Elections in the 1830s ===
By-election, 9 March 1839: Wigan
Party	Candidate	Votes	%	±%
Radical	William Ewart	261	50.2	▲24.0
Conservative	John Hodson Kearsley	259	49.8	▲2.7
Majority		2	0.4	▼1.3
Turnout		520	94.4	▲7.4
Registered electors		551		
Radical hold		Swing	▲10.7	

- Caused by Potter's resignation

General election 1837: Wigan (2 seats)
Party	Candidate	Votes	%	±%
Whig	Charles Strickland Standish	249	26.7	▲1.3
Radical	Richard Potter	245	26.2	▼3.0
Conservative	John Hodson Kearsley	229	24.5	▲1.9
Conservative	Peter Greenall	211	22.6	▼0.1
Turnout		469	87.0	▼5.3
Registered electors		539		
Majority		20	2.2	N/A
Whig gain from Conservative		Swing	▲0.2	
Majority		34	3.6	▼0.2
Radical hold		Swing	▼2.0	

General election 1835: Wigan (2 seats)
Party	Candidate	Votes	%	±%
Conservative	John Hodson Kearsley	296	45.3	▲27.6
Radical	Richard Potter	191	29.2	▼22.4
Whig	Charles Strickland Standish	166	25.4	▼5.3
Turnout		457	92.3	▲2.2
Registered electors		495		
Majority		130	19.9	N/A
Conservative gain from Whig		Swing	▲16.5	
Majority		25	3.8	▼8.6
Radical hold		Swing	▼18.1	

General election 1832: Wigan (2 seats)
Party	Candidate	Votes	%	±%
Whig	Ralph Thicknesse	302	30.7	▼17.0
Radical	Richard Potter	296	30.1	▲26.6
Radical	James Whittle	212	21.5	▲18.0
Tory	John Hodson Kearsley	174	17.7	▼27.6
Turnout		435	90.1	c. ▲58.4
Registered electors		483		
Majority		90	9.2	▼21.1
Whig hold		Swing	▼19.7	
Majority		122	12.4	N/A
Radical gain from Tory		Swing	▲20.2	

General election 1831: Wigan (2 seats)
Party	Candidate	Votes	%	±%
Whig	Ralph Thicknesse	41	47.7	▲41.9
Tory	John Hodson Kearsley	24	27.9	▼18.0
Tory	Richard Bootle-Wilbraham	15	17.4	▼28.5
Radical	Richard Potter	6	7.0	▲4.5
Turnout		38	c. 31.7	c. ▼20.0
Registered electors		c. 120		
Majority		26	30.3	N/A
Whig gain from Tory		Swing	▲32.6	
Majority		18	20.9	▼6.4
Tory hold		Swing	▼19.5	

By-election, 1 March 1831: Wigan
Party	Candidate	Votes	%	±%
Tory	John Hodson Kearsley	48	92.3	▲0.6
Whig	James Hardcastle	4	7.7	▲1.9
Majority		44	84.6	▲57.3
Turnout		52	c. 43.3	c. ▼8.4
Registered electors		c. 120		
Tory hold		Swing	▼0.7	

- Caused by Hodson's resignation

General election 1830: Wigan (2 seats)
Party	Candidate	Votes	%
Tory	James Alexander Hodson	54	44.6
Tory	James Lindsay (1793–1855)	45	37.2
Tory	John Hodson Kearsley	12	9.9
Whig	James Hardcastle	7	5.8
Radical	Richard Potter	3	2.5
Majority		33	27.3
Turnout		62	c. 51.7
Registered electors		c. 120	
Tory hold			
Tory hold			

== See also ==
- List of parliamentary constituencies in Greater Manchester

== Sources ==
- Robert Beatson, A Chronological Register of Both Houses of Parliament (London: Longman, Hurst, Res & Orme, 1807) A Chronological Register of Both Houses of the British Parliament, from the Union in 1708, to the Third Parliament of the United Kingdom of Great Britain and Ireland, in 1807
- D Brunton & D H Pennington, Members of the Long Parliament (London: George Allen & Unwin, 1954)
- Cobbett's Parliamentary history of England, from the Norman Conquest in 1066 to the year 1803 (London: Thomas Hansard, 1808) titles A-Z
- F W S Craig, British Parliamentary Election Results 1832–1885 (2nd edition, Aldershot: Parliamentary Research Services, 1989)
- Maija Jansson (ed.), Proceedings in Parliament, 1614 (House of Commons) (Philadelphia: American Philosophical Society, 1988)
- J E Neale, The Elizabethan House of Commons (London: Jonathan Cape, 1949)
- Henry Stooks Smith, The Parliaments of England from 1715 to 1847 (2nd edition, edited by FWS Craig - Chichester: Parliamentary Reference Publications, 1973)
