= William Gerard (died 1584) =

William Gerard (aft. 1520–1584) was an English Member of Parliament for the constituencies of Preston and Wigan during the reigns of Mary I and Elizabeth I.

== Biography ==
Gerard was born after 1520. He was the son of James Gerard of Astley and Ince, Lancashire and Margaret, daughter of John Holcroft; and brother of Sir Gilbert Gerard of Ince.

By 1552 Gerard had been appointed Receiver of the Middlesex lands of the Edward, Lord North by 1552. He was return as a member of four parliaments: Preston October 1553 (1st Parliament of Mary I); Wigan 1559 (1st Elizabeth); Wigan 1563 (2nd Elizabeth); and Wigan, 1571 (3rd Elizabeth). He was Feodary for Middlesex in 1565. He was appointed a governor of Harrow School in 1572. From March until December 1578 he was escheator in Kent and Middlesex, and from around 1583 he was a Justice of the Peace in Middlesex. He died on 19 September 1584.

== Family ==
Gerard married Dorothy, daughter of Thomas Page of Sudbury Court, Middlesex. They had eight sons including William Gerard and four daughters.
