= John Whittaker (UKIP politician) =

British politician (born 1945)

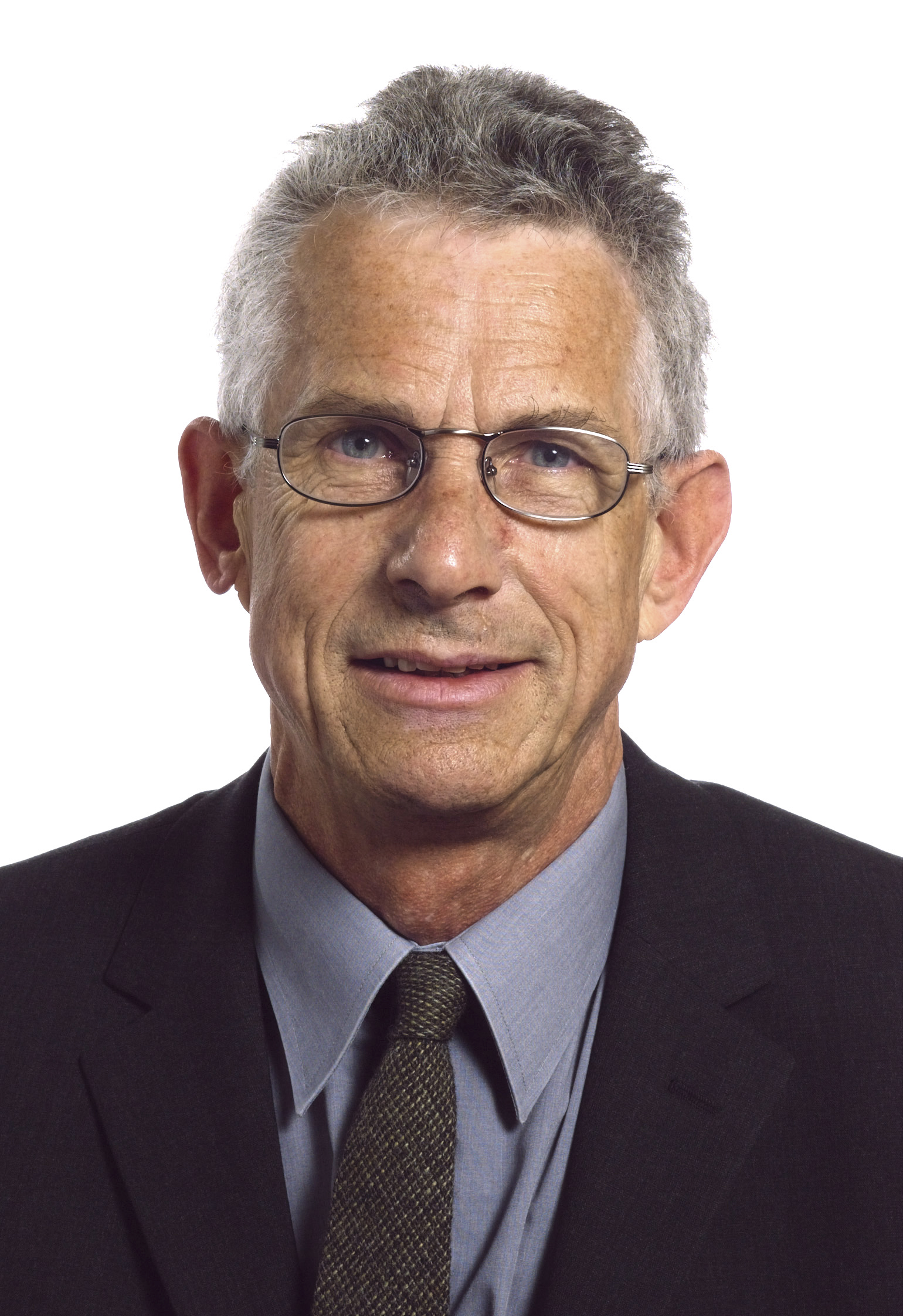

Chairman of the UK Independence Party
- In office 27 September 2006 – 8 September 2008
- Leader: Nigel Farage
- Preceded by: David Campbell Bannerman
- Succeeded by: Paul Nuttall

Member of the European Parliament for North West England
- In office 13 June 2004 – 4 June 2009
- Preceded by: Richard Fletcher-Vane
- Succeeded by: Paul Nuttall

Personal details
- Born: 7 June 1945 (age 81) Oldham, Lancashire, England
- Party: UKIP
- Education: BA (Cape Town) BSc (Queen Mary University of London) PhD (University of Cape Town)

John Whittaker (born 7 June 1945) is a former UK Independence Party (UKIP) politician who was a Member of the European Parliament (MEP) for the North West England region from 2004 to 2009.

Whittaker was born in Oldham, Lancashire. He was educated at Queen Mary University of London (BSc Physics, 1966) and the University of Cape Town (PhD Physics, 1980; BA Economics, 1982). He is a senior lecturer in economics at Lancaster University. His main research and teaching interests are in monetary policy and macroeconomics, and recently he has taken a particular interest in the problems associated with the single currency.

He stood for UKIP in the Littleborough and Saddleworth by-election in 1995 where he came 5th out of 10 candidates behind the Official Monster Raving Loony Party.

Whittaker was the UKIP's lead candidate in the North West for the European Parliament elections in 1999. Though UKIP gained 6.5% of the vote in the region, he fell short of being elected by about 0.5 per cent. However, in 2004 he was more successful, being one of 12 UKIP candidates to win a European seat in the big UKIP breakthrough of that year.

He contested the 2005 general election for the constituencies of Ashton under Lyne, Crosby, Heywood and Middleton, Hyndburn, Manchester Central, Rochdale, Stalybridge and Hyde and Wigan.

In 2005, Whittaker became UKIP's official spokesman on Economic and Monetary Affairs. In September 2006, following the election of Nigel Farage as leader of UKIP, Whittaker was appointed party chairman.

Party political offices
Preceded by David Campbell-Bannerman	Chairman of the UK Independence Party; 2007–2008	Succeeded by Paul Nuttall
Preceded by Richard Fletcher-Vane	Member of the European Parliament for North West England; 2004–2009	Succeeded by Paul Nuttall
