= Peter Greenall (politician) =

British brewer and politician

Member of Parliament for Wigan
- In office 1 July 1841 – 25 September 1845 Serving with Charles Strickland Standish (1842–1845); Thomas Bright Crosse (1841–1842)
- Preceded by: William Ewart; Charles Strickland Standish
- Succeeded by: Charles Strickland Standish; James Alexander Lindsay

Personal details
- Born: 25 April 1796 Wilderspool, Warrington, Cheshire, England
- Died: 18 September 1845 (aged 49) St Helens, Lancashire, England
- Cause of death: Apoplexy
- Party: Conservative
- Spouse: Eleanor Pilkington (m. 1821)
- Parent(s): Edward Greenall; Betty Pratt
- Relatives: Thomas Greenall (grandfather); Sir Gilbert Greenall, 1st Baronet (brother)

Peter Greenall (25 April 1796 – 25 September 1845) was a British brewer and Conservative politician.

== Family ==
Born in Wilderspool, Warrington, Greenall was the son of Edward Greenall and Betty née Pratt of Walton Hall, Cheshire, and brother of Sir Gilbert Greenall, 1st Baronet. In 1821, he married Eleanor Pilkington, daughter of William Pilkington and sister of Richard and William Pilkington, who were partners with their father in a local wine and spirit business. The union brought a dowry of £1,000.

== Business ==
His grandfather, Thomas Greenall, in 1761, had established a brewery in South Lancashire, now known as De Vere, and this land eventually developed into the town of St Helens, Merseyside. The business was passed through the family and, in 1818, Peter was sent to take charge of the brewery and the family's possessions there. Greenall assumed responsibility for the local area, laying pipes from the brewery's ponds to supply water to those able to afford it. The first building society in the area was formed by him, and many homes were built on his land as a result, leading to his rents totalling £2,500 a year by 1830.

Greenall also headed the local Odd Fellows lodge, named the Independent Order of Oddfellows Manchester Unity, when it opened in 1825, and he became its grandmaster when St Helens became a district under law. Further, he was a signatory on the share certificates of the local branch of the Gas Light and Coke Company when it formed in 1832, and took a lead in the launch of the St Helens and Runcorn Gap Railway in 1830, which provided transport down to the River Mersey, competing against the Trent and Mersey Canal, from November 1832.

After this, he became involved with the Pilkingtons' glassworks firm, Pilkington. While he held just three of the eleven shares in the partnership, his influence at the Warrington bank of Parr, Lyon and Greenall was instrumental in saving the company from going under. By 1842, at the worst point of a depression, the company's overdraft had reached £20,000 and all shares were totalled at just £22,600.

== Political career ==
Greenall first stood as a Conservative candidate to become Member of Parliament for Wigan at the 1837 general election, but was unsuccessful. He again stood in 1841 and this time was elected. In Parliament, he used his influence to secure the passage of the St Helens Waterworks Bill in 1844 and the St Helens Improvement Bill in 1845, the latter of which gained the borough its first effective local government. Yet, the same year, he died, bringing to a premature end his political career.

== Death ==
Greenall died on 18 September 1845 at his home in St Helens from apoplexy, the first attack of which lasted five minutes. His standing in the town was so prominent that the shops half-closed their shutters in remembrance and, at his funeral six days later, the shops closed altogether. Many townsfolk flocked to his funeral to pay their last respects—although his reputation was high in just a local sense.

Parliament of the United Kingdom
Preceded by William Ewart; Charles Strickland Standish	Member of Parliament for Wigan; 1841–1845; With: Charles Strickland Standish (1842–1845); Thomas Bright Crosse (1841–1842)	Succeeded by Charles Strickland Standish; James Lindsay
