= William Gerard (died 1609) =

Member of the Parliament of England

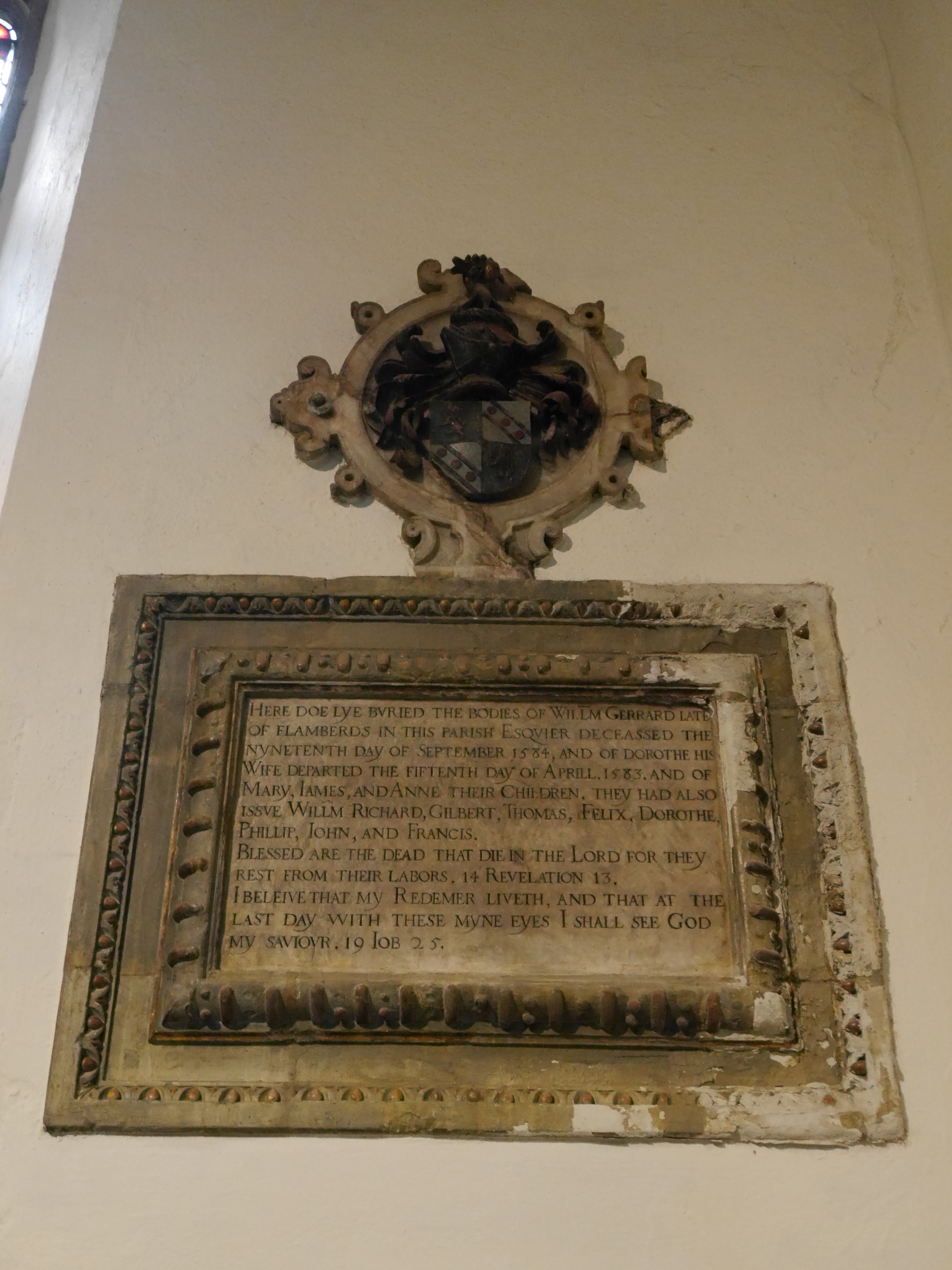
Memorial, St Mary's, Harrow on the Hill

William Gerard (c. 1551–1609), of Harrow, Middlesex, was an English politician who sat in the House of Commons at various times between 1584 and 1593.

== Biography ==
Gerard was the eldest son of William Gerard and his wife Dorothy, daughter of Thomas Page of Sudbury Court, Middlesex. He went to Harrow School and Trinity College, Cambridge from where he graduated with a BA in 1565 and a MA in 1572. He was admitted to Gray's Inn in 1572 and was called to the bar in 1580.

Gerard represented the constituency of Wigan for Queen Elizabeth's parliaments of 1584 (her 5th), 1586 (6th) and 1593 (8th). He was a Justice of the Peace in Middlesex from 1591. He died on 23 August 1609, and was buried at Harrow.

== Family ==
Gerard married Dorothy, daughter of Anthony Ratcliffe, alderman of London. They had eight sons and six daughters, including Gilbert his heir.
