= Allen Parkinson =

British Labour Party politician and coal miner

Allen Parkinson CBE

Member of Parliament for Wigan
- In office 14 December 1918 – 7 December 1941
- Preceded by: Reginald Neville
- Succeeded by: William Foster

Personal details
- Born: 15 October 1870 Hindley Green, Lancashire, England
- Died: 7 December 1941 (aged 71)
- Party: Labour

John Allen Parkinson CBE (15 October 1870 – 7 December 1941) was a British Labour Party politician and former coal miner. He stood for Parliament seven times and was overwhelmingly elected each time.

== Biography ==
Parkinson was born in Hindley Green, Lancashire, and worked as a coal miner in the Lancashire Coalfield. He entered politics in 1908, when he was elected as a member of the Urban District Council in Abram, He then served many years on the Lancashire County Council. In 1917, he was appointed miners' agent for the Lancashire and Cheshire Miners' Federation.

Parkinson was elected to the House of Commons as Member of Parliament (MP) for Wigan at the 1918 general election supported by the Miners' Federation of Great Britain, replacing the Conservative MP Reginald Neville. He served as a Lord Commissioner of the Treasury in Prime Minister Ramsay MacDonald's second and third ministries. He stayed active in the mining industry throughout his life, and was a member of a 1930 Parliamentary delegation that traveled to Northern Rhodesia to investigate working conditions in the copper-mining industry.

Parkinson was re-elected at each subsequent general election until his death in Orrell at the age of 71 in 1941, when he became the first of four Wigan MPs to die in office in the 20th century. In the consequent by-election in 1942, the seat was held for Labour by William Foster. Wigan has returned Labour MPs ever since.

Parkinson was twice married; his first wife Alice (née Pilkington) died in 1904. He married Ida (née Atkinson) the following year.

He was made a Commander of the Order of the British Empire in the 1931 New Year Honours.

Parliament of the United Kingdom
Preceded by Reginald Neville	Member of Parliament for Wigan; 1918–1941	Succeeded by William Foster
