= William Wilson (Westhoughton MP) =

British trade unionist and Labour politician (1855–1921)

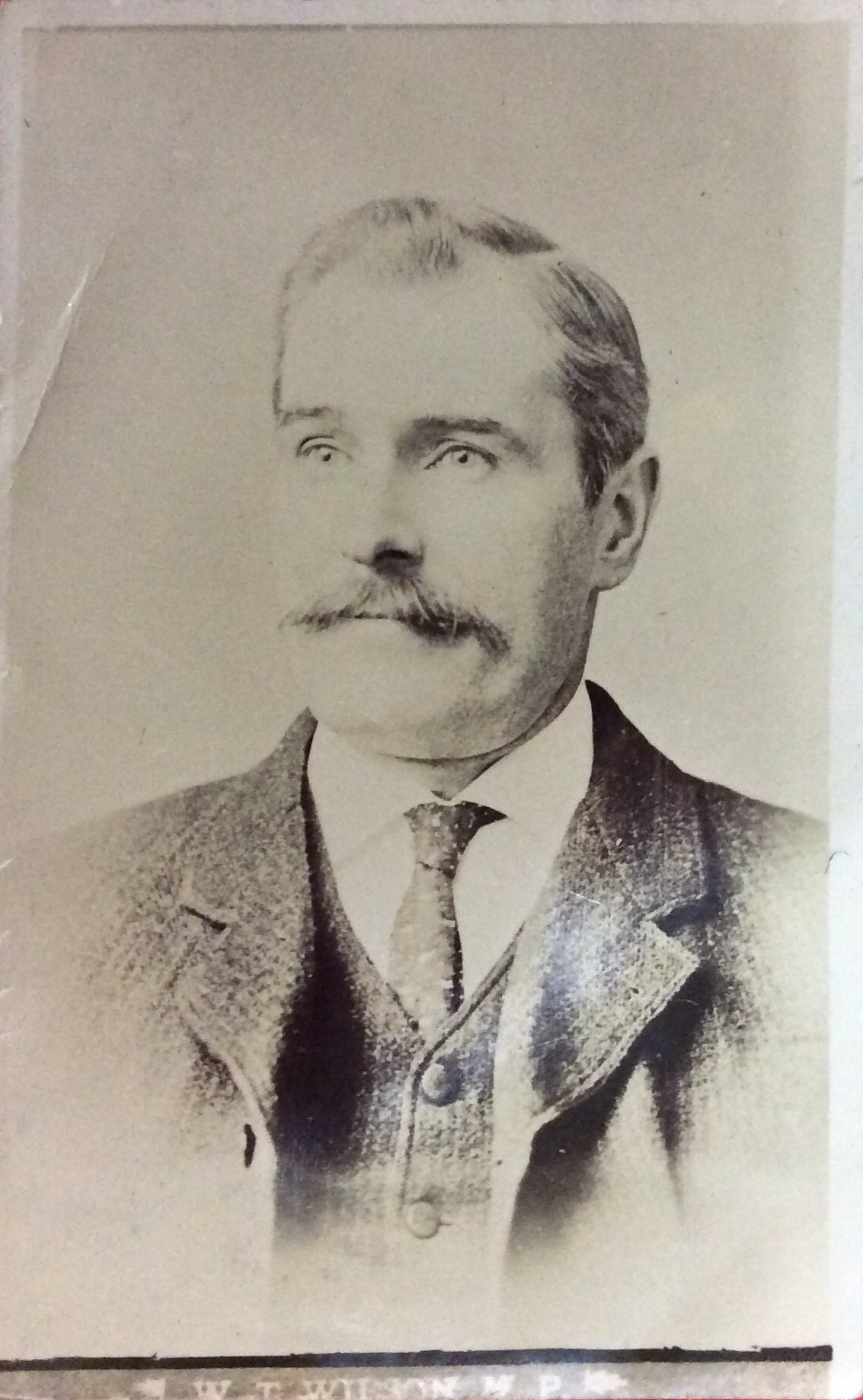

Member of Parliament for Westhoughton
- In office 12 January 1906 – 14 August 1921
- Preceded by: Edward Stanley
- Succeeded by: Rhys Davies

Personal details
- Born: 1855 Kendal
- Died: 14 August 1921 (aged 65–66) Bolton
- Party: Labour

William Tyson Wilson (1855 – 14 August 1921) was a British trade unionist and Labour politician.

Tyson was born in Westmorland, moving to Bolton, Lancashire, in 1889. He was a carpenter, and joined the Bolton branch of the Amalgamated Society of Carpenters and Joiners. He was a member of the executive or general council of the union on several occasions from 1893, and was chairman of the general council in 1910.

At the 1906 general election Wilson was one of 29 successful Labour Representation Committee candidates, being elected MP for Westhoughton. On 22 February 1906 he introduced a private member's bill seeking to amend the Education Acts and create a statutory school meals service. The bill received the support of the government and was enacted as the Education (Provision of Meals) Act 1906.

He was made a whip in 1915, and was promoted to chief whip in 1919, when the Labour Party became the official opposition.

W T Wilson died suddenly of a cerebral hemorrhage on a Bolton street on Sunday, 14 August 1921. He was buried in St Peter's Churchyard, Halliwell on 17 August 1921.

Parliament of the United Kingdom
Preceded by Edward Stanley	Member of Parliament for Westhoughton; 1906–1921	Succeeded by Rhys Davies
