= Ronald Williams (Labour politician) =

British Labour Party politician

Ronald Watkins Williams (8 July 1907 –14 March 1958) was a British Labour Party politician.

He was elected to the House of Commons as the Member of Parliament (MP) for Wigan in a by-election in 1948, following the death in 1947 of sitting Labour MP William Foster.

Williams was re-elected in this safe Labour seat at the 1950 general election and returned again at the 1955 general election, but died aged 50 in 1958. At the subsequent by-election in 1958, the seat was held for Labour by Alan Fitch.

Parliament of the United Kingdom
Preceded by William Foster	Member of Parliament for Wigan; 1948–1958	Succeeded by Alan Fitch
