= John Hodson Kearsley =

British Member of Parliament (1785–1842)

John Hodson Kearsley (28 February 1785 - 2 October 1842) was a British politician, who served as the Member of Parliament for Wigan from 1831 to 1832, and from 1835 to 1837.

Kearsley was the third son of Edward Kearsley and his wife Ann (née Hodson); his father was a partner in a Wigan cotton mill along with his mother's brother John Hodson. Kearsley became a brewer rather than enter the cotton business, and became wealthy after receiving large inheritances following the death of both his father and father-in-law.

The Hodsons were a politically prominent family in Wigan; Kearsley's uncle, John Hodson, was one of the town's two Members of Parliament from 1802 to 1820, and was succeeded by Kearsley's cousin, James Alexander Hodson, who served from 1820 to 1831. Kearsley himself was mayor of Wigan in 1813, 1819, and 1825, and colonel of the local yeomanry troop, the Wigan Volunteer Light Horse. In the 1830 general election, Kearsley put himself forward as a surprise candidate alongside his cousin, but was not elected. Hodson then stood down, and Kearsley was returned in a by-election. While he received a majority of votes, only around a hundred freemen were actually voters, and he was strongly opposed among the general population; he was attacked during the by-election, and during the subsequent 1831 general election his windows were smashed and he "did not dare appear".

He was a conservative, voting against the three Reform Bills, and was overwhelmingly defeated at the post-Reform 1832 general election. He returned to Parliament for the same seat in the 1835 general election, but was narrowly defeated in the 1837 general election, and again when he stood in an 1839 by-election. He did not stand again in 1841.

He died in 1842, widowed and with no children. His name is sometimes given as "Hodgson".
