= Joseph Acton =

Joseph Acton may refer to:

- Joe Acton, British professional wrestler
- Joseph Acton (MP), British Whig politician

== See also ==
- Joseph Acton Morris, English geographer and school teacher
