= Mesnes Park, Wigan =

Park in Wigan, Greater Manchester, England

Mesnes Park
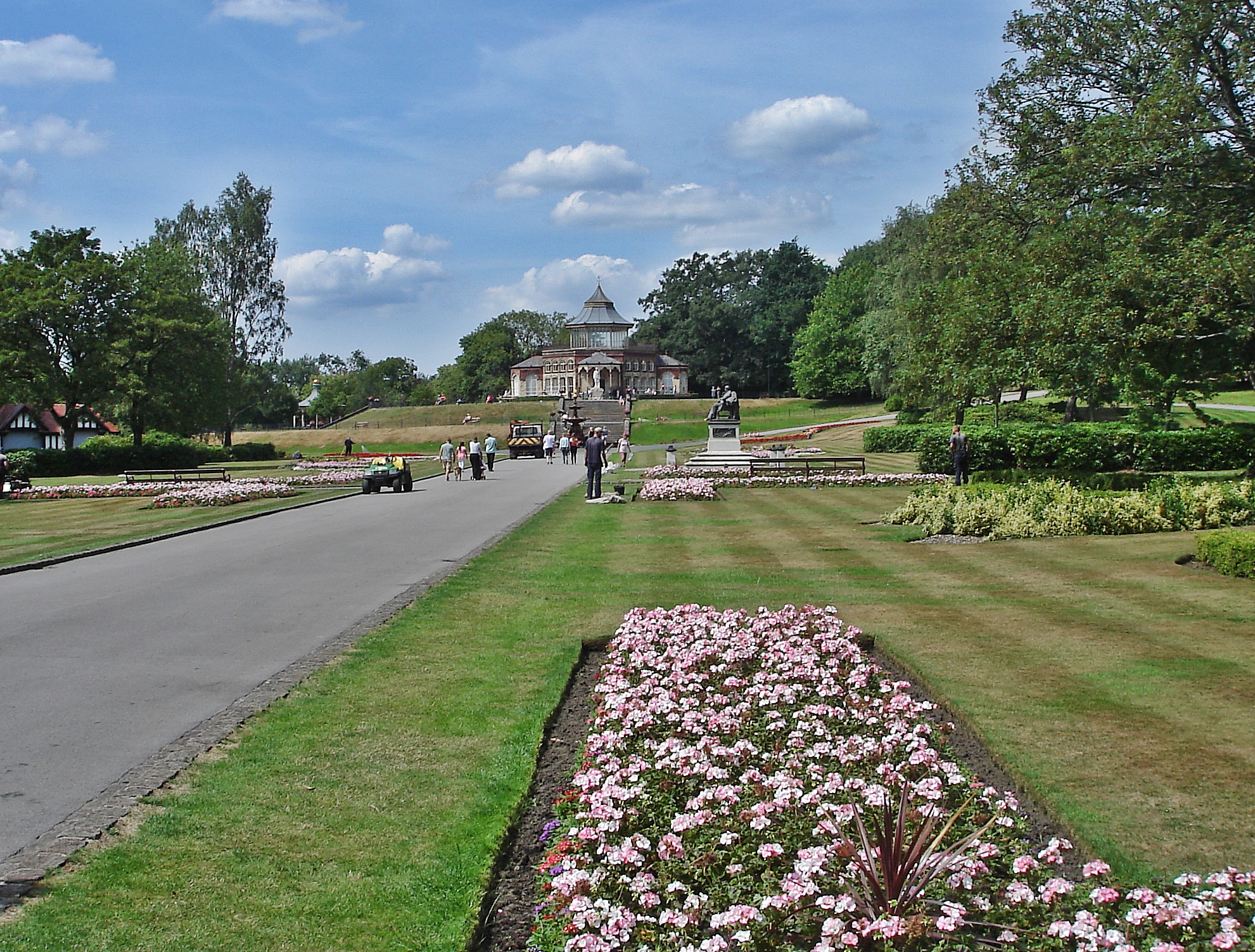
- Mesnes Park, looking towards the Pavilion

- Location within Greater Manchester
- Type: Public park
- Location: Wigan, Greater Manchester, England
- OS grid: SD579064
- Coordinates: 53°33′07″N 2°38′10″W
- Opened: 1878
- Operator: Wigan Metropolitan Borough Council
- Status: Open all year

Mesnes Park (English: /ˈmeɪnz ˈpɑːk/(Mains)) is a Victorian public park dating from 1878 in Wigan, Greater Manchester, UK. Covering approximately 30 acres (12 ha), the elongated site lies to the north-west of the town centre, with its principal entrance at the junction of Bridgeman Terrace and Mesnes Park Terrace.

The park features formal flower beds set within broad lawns, a pool, children's play areas, mini golf, sports grounds, and a café. During 2007–2013, it underwent a multi-million-pound restoration of several of its features funded by a grant from the Heritage Lottery Fund.

== Listed features ==
The park is Grade II listed and contains seven original Grade II listed structures. The main entrance gateway consists of carved sandstone piers and double cast-iron gates bearing the Wigan town shield and the date 1878. Adjacent to the gateway is the restored entrance lodge, now used for meetings and weddings.

On the right hand side of the main path (from the entrance to the main Pavilion feature) is the bronze statue of former local MP and benefactor Sir Francis Sharpe Powell. Local tradition holds that rubbing his bronze foot brings good luck. Over time, repeated contact caused significant wear, eventually creating a hole in the shoe, which has since been professionally restored.

At the end of the main path is the south-east double flight of sandstone steps up to the Pavilion. At the top of the steps stands a memorial to the soldiers of the Boer War. The Pavilion is the main feature of the park, with a cafė and two floors of seating. The structure is constructed to an octagonal plan in cast iron, clad on the outside with brick and terracotta tiling. A second double flight of steps, similar to the south-east flight, leads down from the south-west side of the Pavilion.

There is a 10-sided bandstand, with cast-iron columns and a metal-clad wooden roof. In 2012, it was restored and provided with electricity; it is also licensed to hold weddings and other formal ceremonies.

== History ==
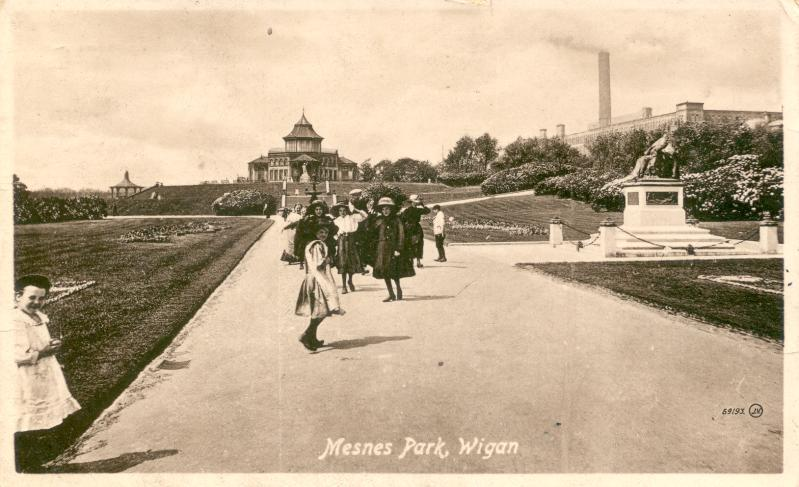
The park, looking towards the Pavilion, in c. 1913

The land within which Mesnes Park lies was traditionally known as the Mesnes, as it was part of the manorial demesnes land. The Rector of Wigan, being Lord of the manor, it formed part of the Wigan Rectory Glebe Estate. There was a proposal in 1837 to enclose the land through an Act of Parliament. However, the MPs representing Wigan opposed it, saying the area was widely used by local residents and contained public footpaths. As a result, the proposal was revised to keep part of the land open for public recreation. The first Ordnance Survey of 1848 shows there were two collieries operating within the present park's boundaries.

In 1871, 16 acres (6.5 ha) of the Mesnes were sold to Wigan Corporation for a Grammar School and public park. The purchase was arranged by Nathaniel Eckersley, the then Mayor of Wigan. A further 14 acres (5.5 ha) of land was leased and included the site of Turner's Colliery, which continued in operation until 1880. A competition was held in 1877 for the design of a public park, which had 21 submissions that varied greatly, and was won by John McClean of Castle Donington, who was then awarded the contract to supervise the work.

Nathaniel Eckersley, High Sheriff of Lancashire at that time, performed the opening ceremony in August 1878, although construction was still incomplete.

The Pavilion was opened in 1880, and the area north of it was planned for activities such as archery, cricket, lawn tennis, and bowling, and also included creating a second pond, as outlined when the park first opened. By 1892, the bandstand structures were complete and open for performances. In 1903, the Boer War memorial was opened, the same year Barley Brook was culverted, enabling the construction of the first bowling green and additional recreation space. A tennis ground was created near the lodge in 1908.

Additional civic memorials were added in the early 20th century. In 1910, the statue of Sir Francis Sharp Powell MP was unveiled, and in 1920, two field guns and a tank were installed in the park. Recreational facilities expanded during the 1920s, including a second bowling green in 1921 and new tennis courts north of the grammar school. The original Coalbrookdale Fountain was removed in 1921. Barley Brook was fully culverted in 1922, and the land was levelled with government assistance, allowing the construction of further bowling, putting, and tennis facilities by 1926. The swings were also moved to a new location near the Gidlow Mill boundary.

During the Second World War, metal railings and gates were removed, and two of the grass tennis courts were used for growing vegetables. The main gates were reinstalled after being found in a scrapyard in 1950. The statue of the officer commemorating the Boer War was taken down in 1968 after it had deteriorated. During the 1990s, a new children's play area was opened, and the public toilets were closed.

In 1998, the "Friends of Menses Park" was formed. The group is actively involved in the park’s daily operations and works to increase its visibility within the local community.

From 2007 to 2013, the park underwent a £6.1 million restoration. The park reopened on 29 September 2013 with a ceremony led by Stuart Maconie. Restoration work was carried out on the Pavillion, Lodge, Powell statue, and other listed features, while also reinstating the Coalbrookdale fountain and Pulham waterfall, which were previously lost. Later that year, a replica of the removed Boer War statue was unveiled by Friends of the Boer War Memorial.

== Gallery ==
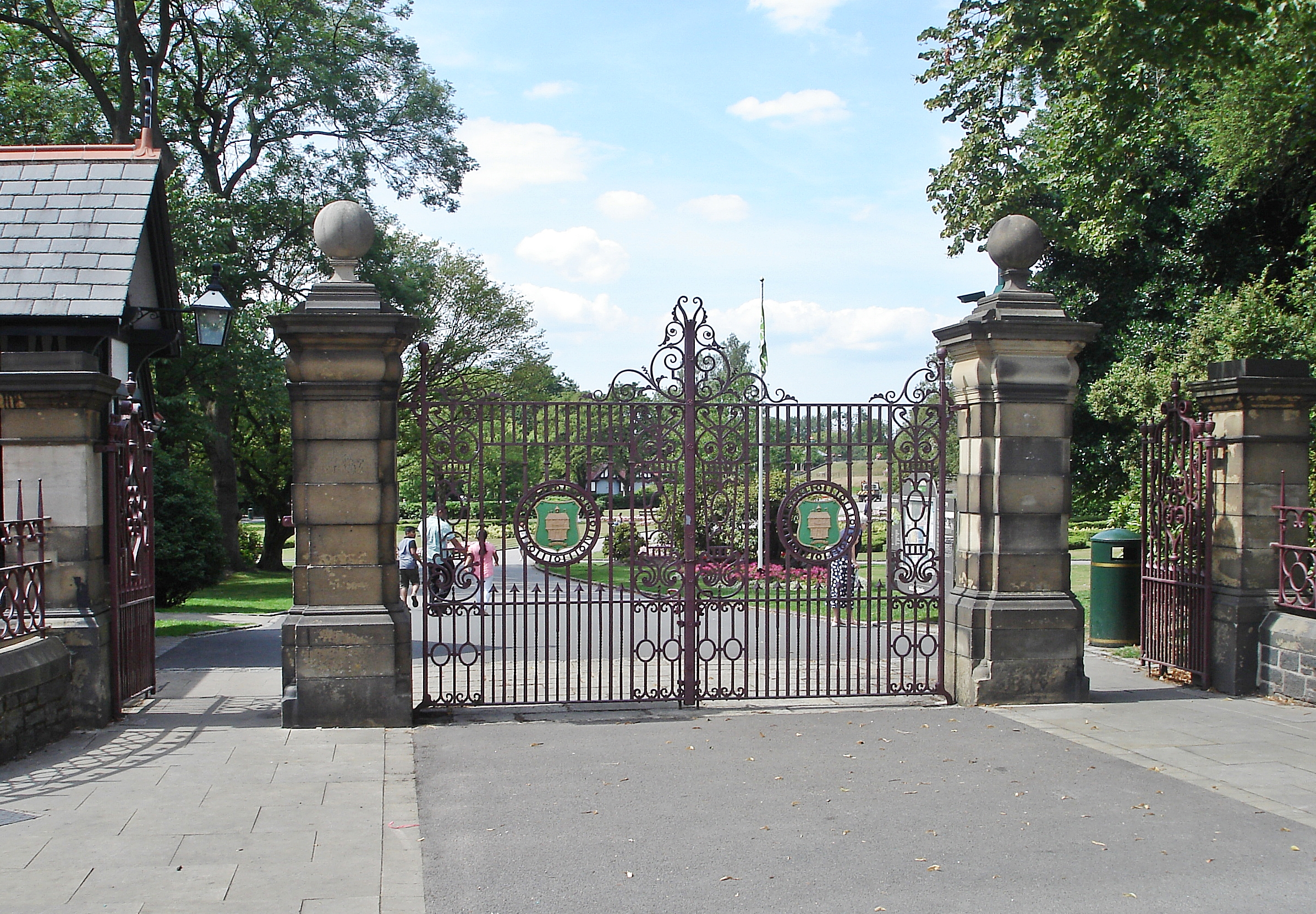
Entrance gateway

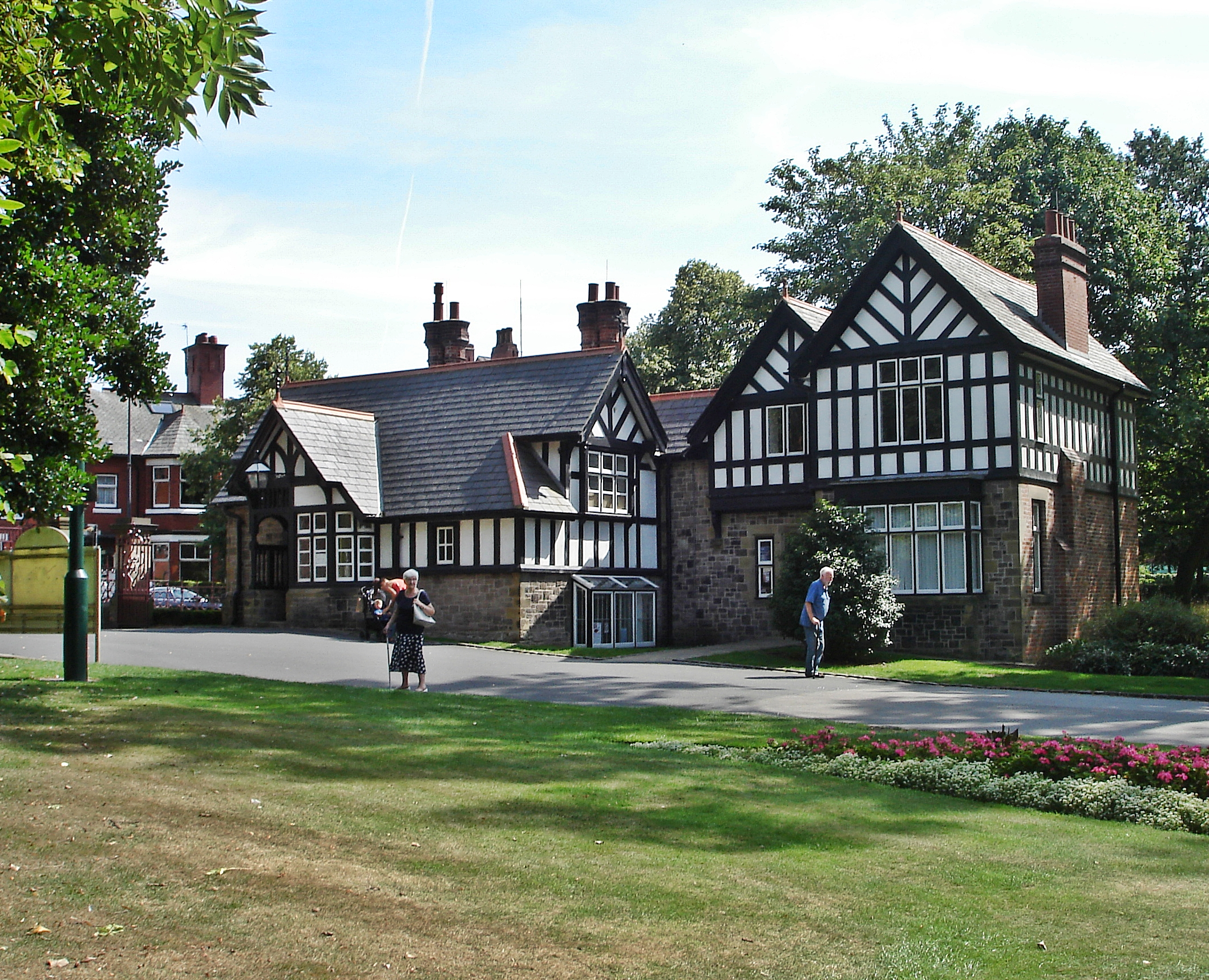
Entrance Lodge

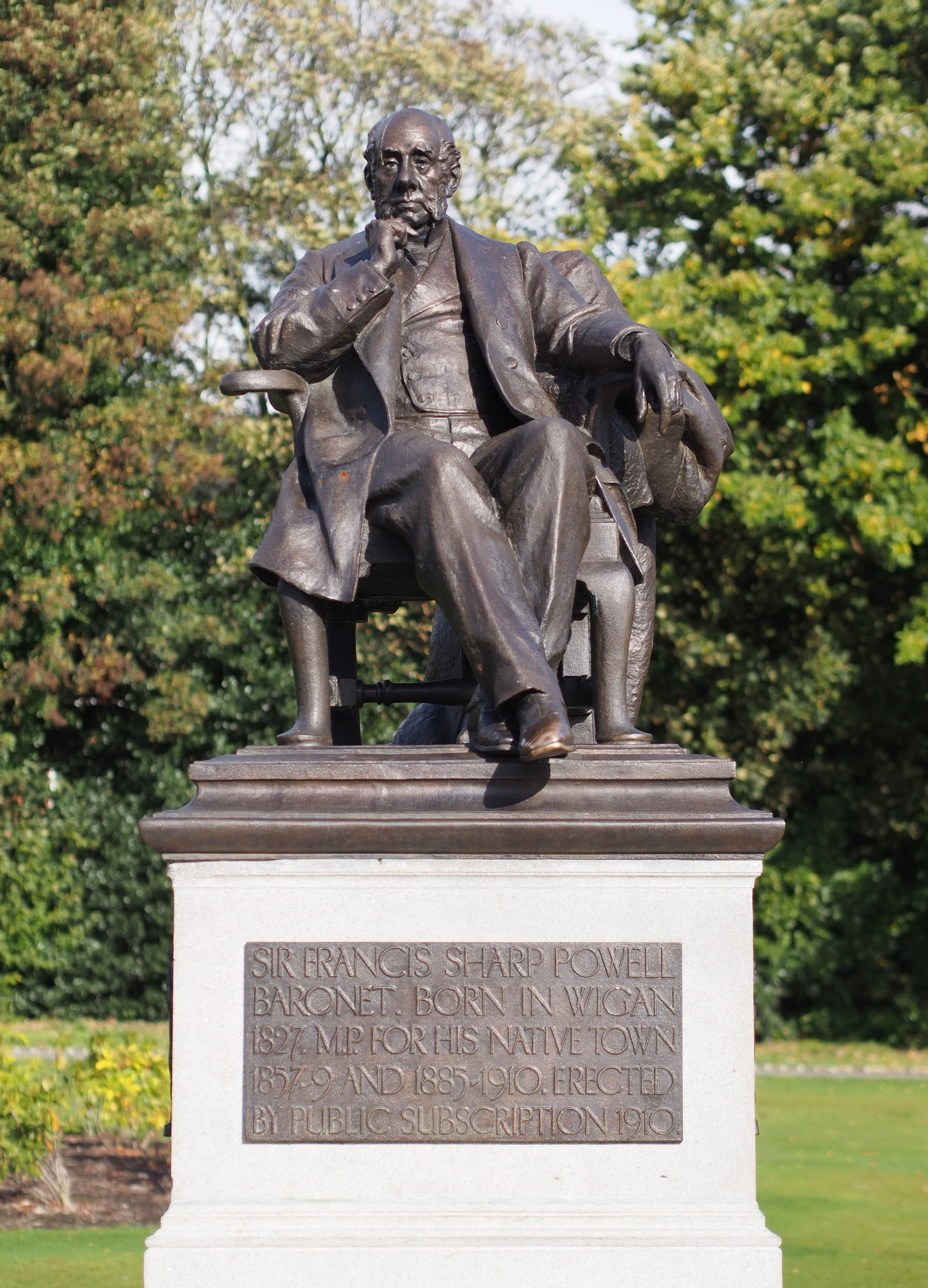
Statue of Sir Francis Powell

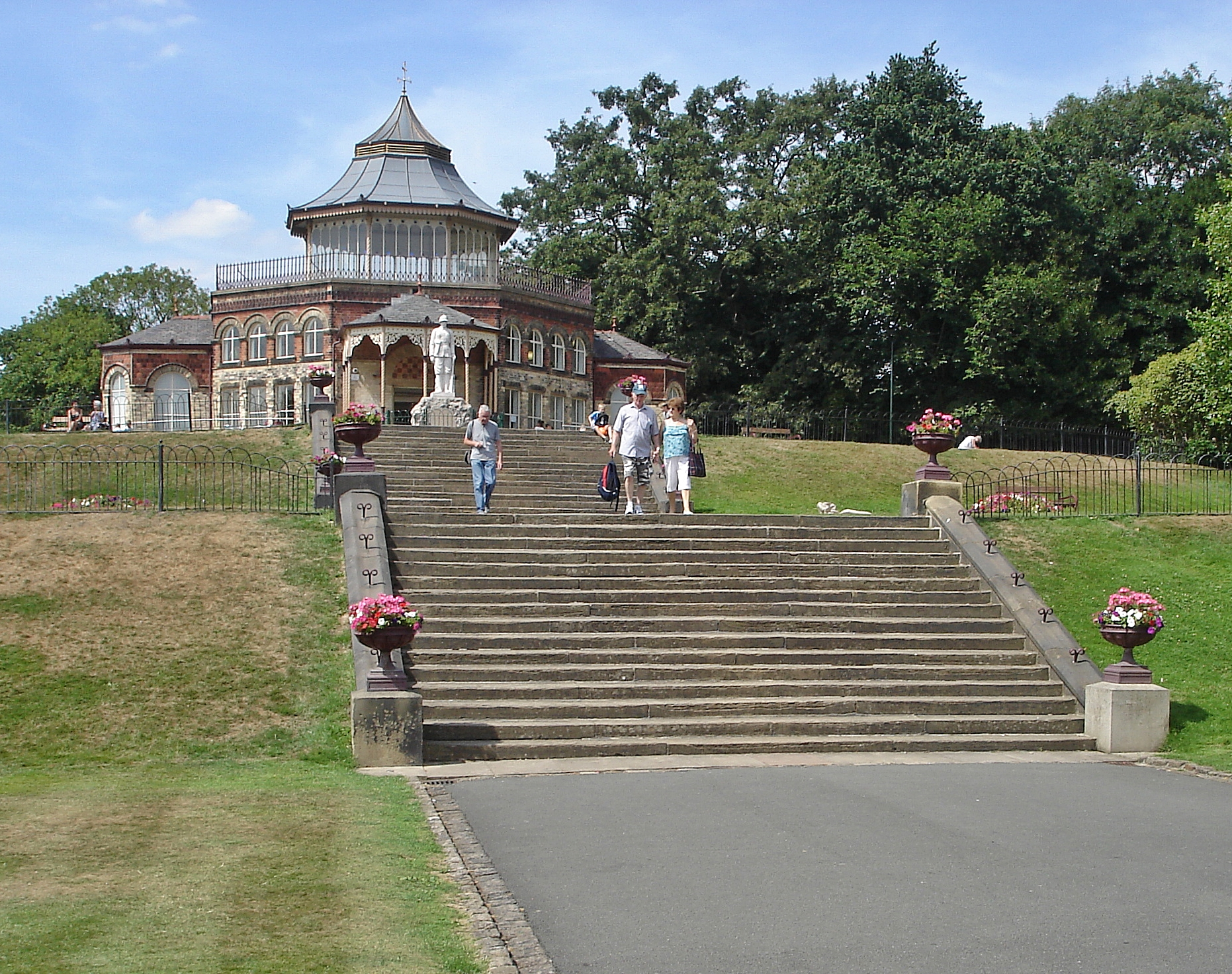
Flight of steps up to Boer War memorial and Pavilion

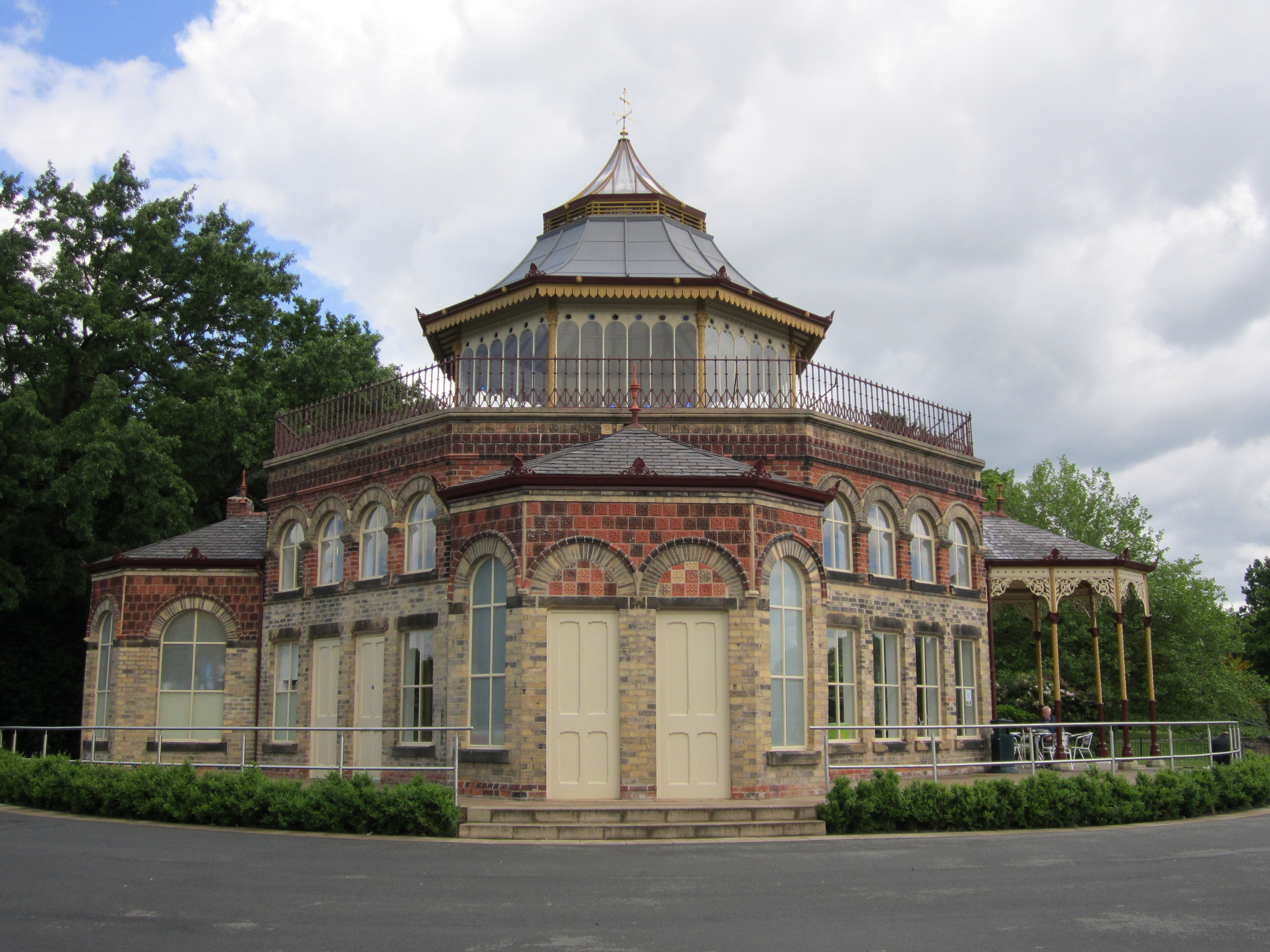
The Pavilion

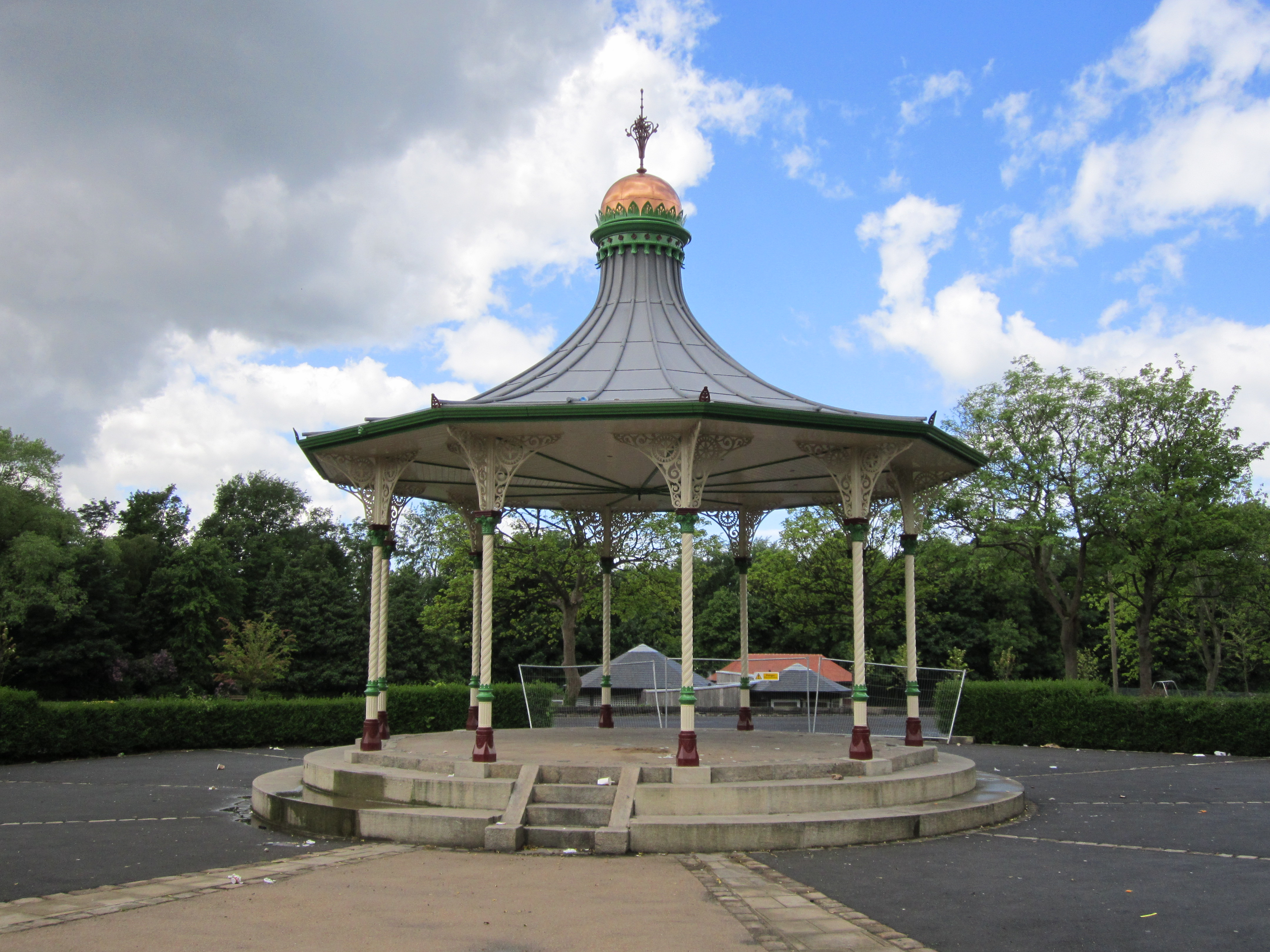
The bandstand

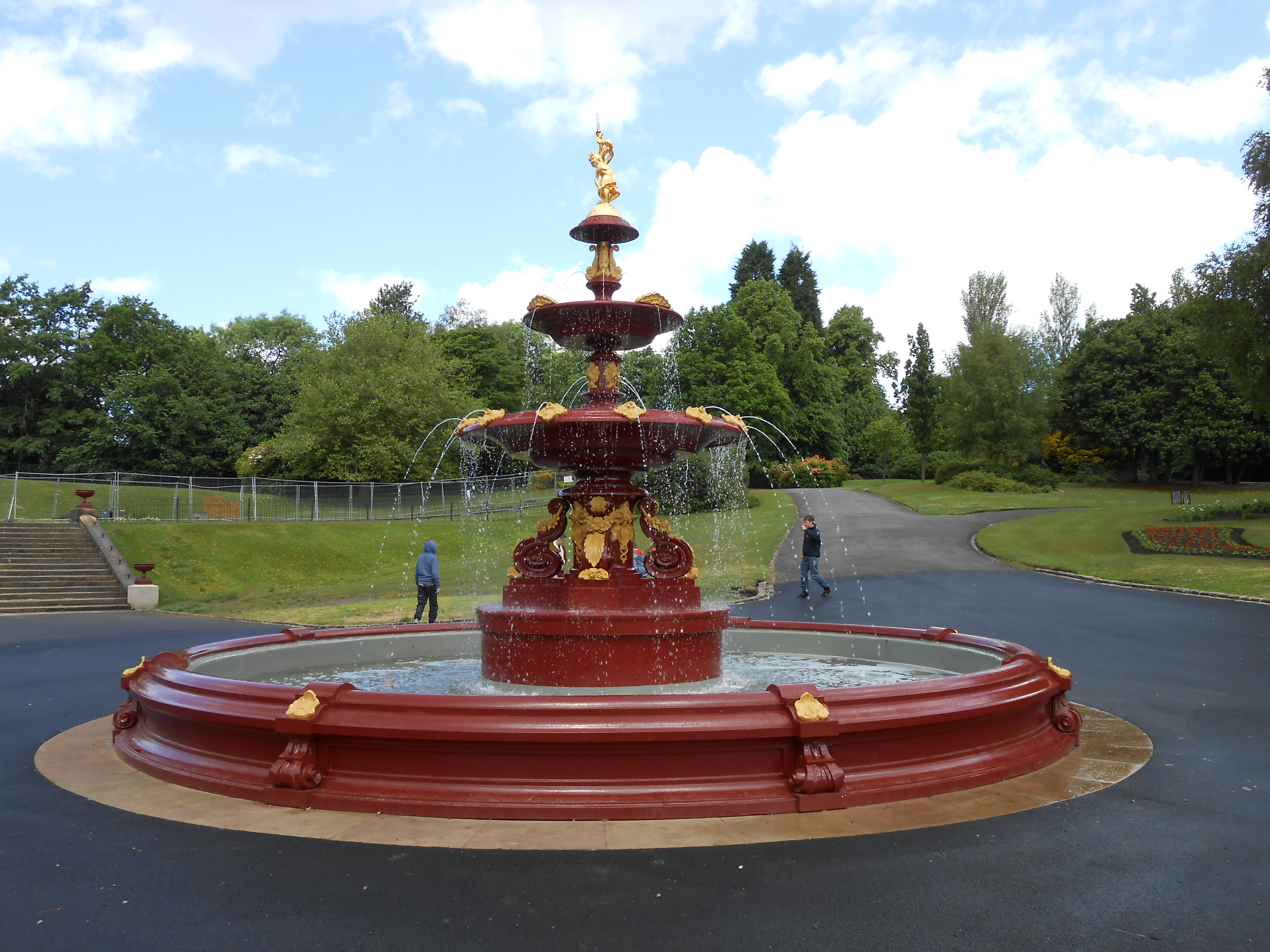
The Coalbrookdale fountain

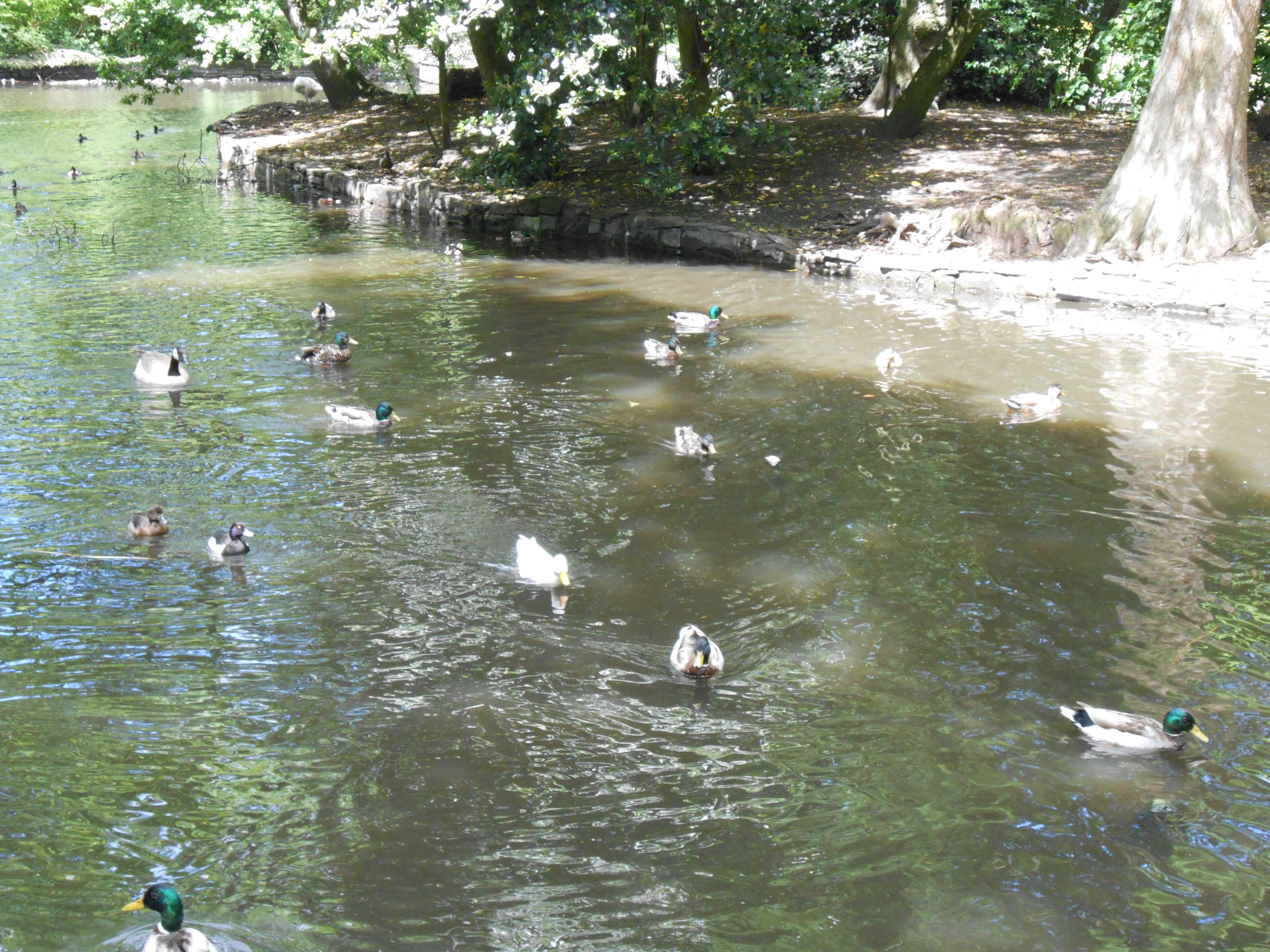
The duckpond

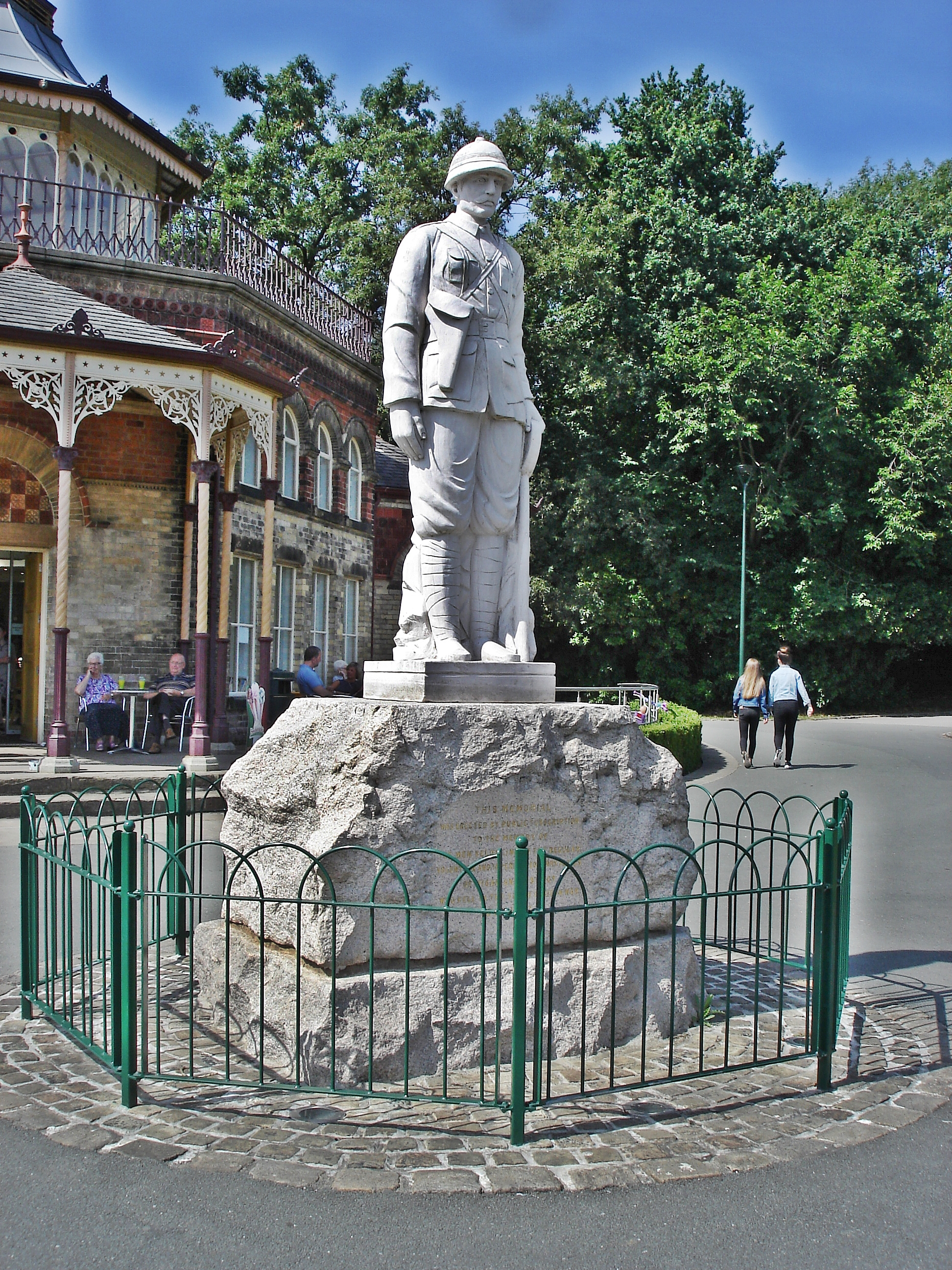
The Boer War memorial

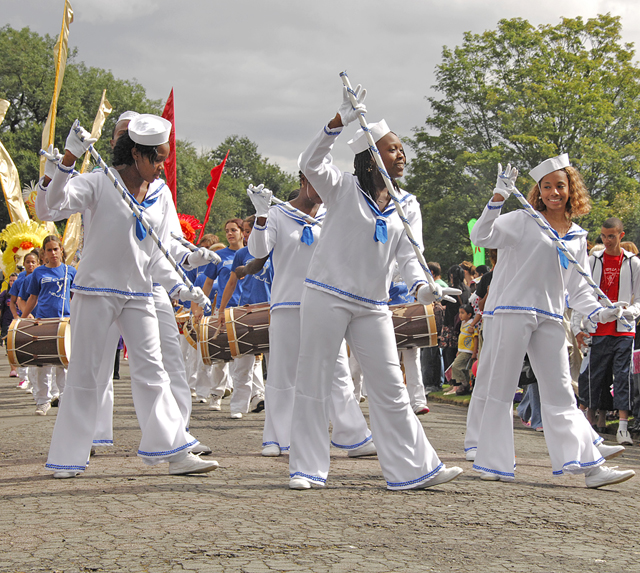
WOW Festival 2008
