= Sir Francis Powell, 1st Baronet =

British politician

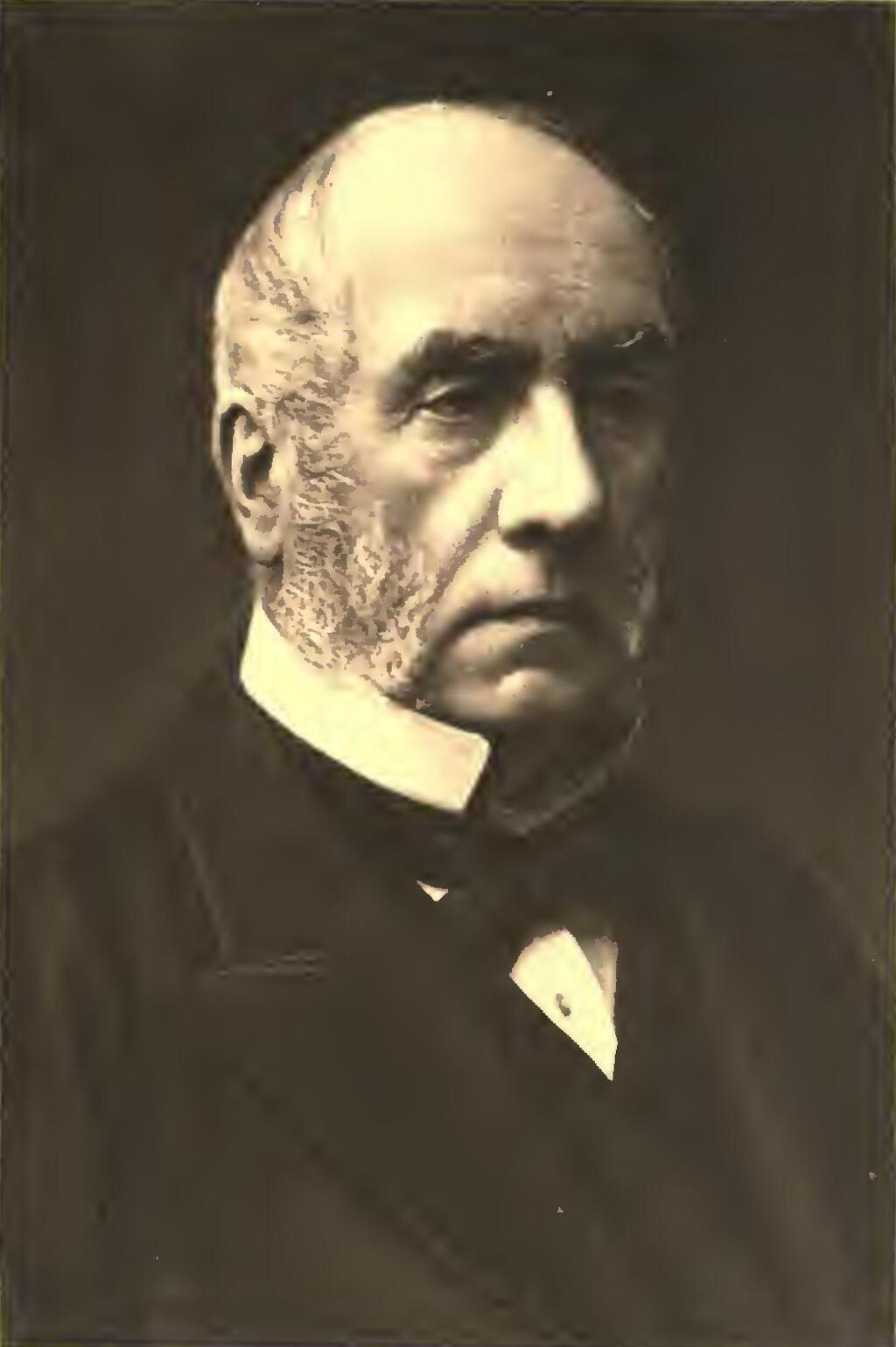
Sir Francis Sharp Powell

Sir Francis Sharp Powell, 1st Baronet (29 June 1827 – 24 December 1911) was an English Conservative politician who sat in the House of Commons between 1863 and 1910.

== Early life and career ==
Powell was the son of the Rev. Benjamin Powell of Wigan and his wife Anne Wade, daughter of the Rev. T. Wade. He was educated at Uppingham School, Sedbergh School and St John's College, Cambridge. He was called to the bar at Inner Temple in 1853, and practised on the Northern Circuit. He was a J.P. for Lancashire and the West Riding of Yorkshire.

== In politics ==
In the 1857 general election Powell was elected as a Member of Parliament (MP) for Wigan, but was not re-elected in 1859. Later in that Parliament, he was elected at a by-election for Cambridge but lost the seat in the 1868 general election. He was re-elected in 1865, and held the seat until his defeat at the 1868 general election

He was next elected MP for Northern Division of West Riding, Yorkshire in 1872 but lost the seat in the 1874 general election. He was elected as MP for Wigan at a by-election in January 1881, but was unseated on account of corrupt practices at the election. He stood again for Wigan in the 1885 general election and was elected. He held the seat until the January 1910 general election.

== Later life ==
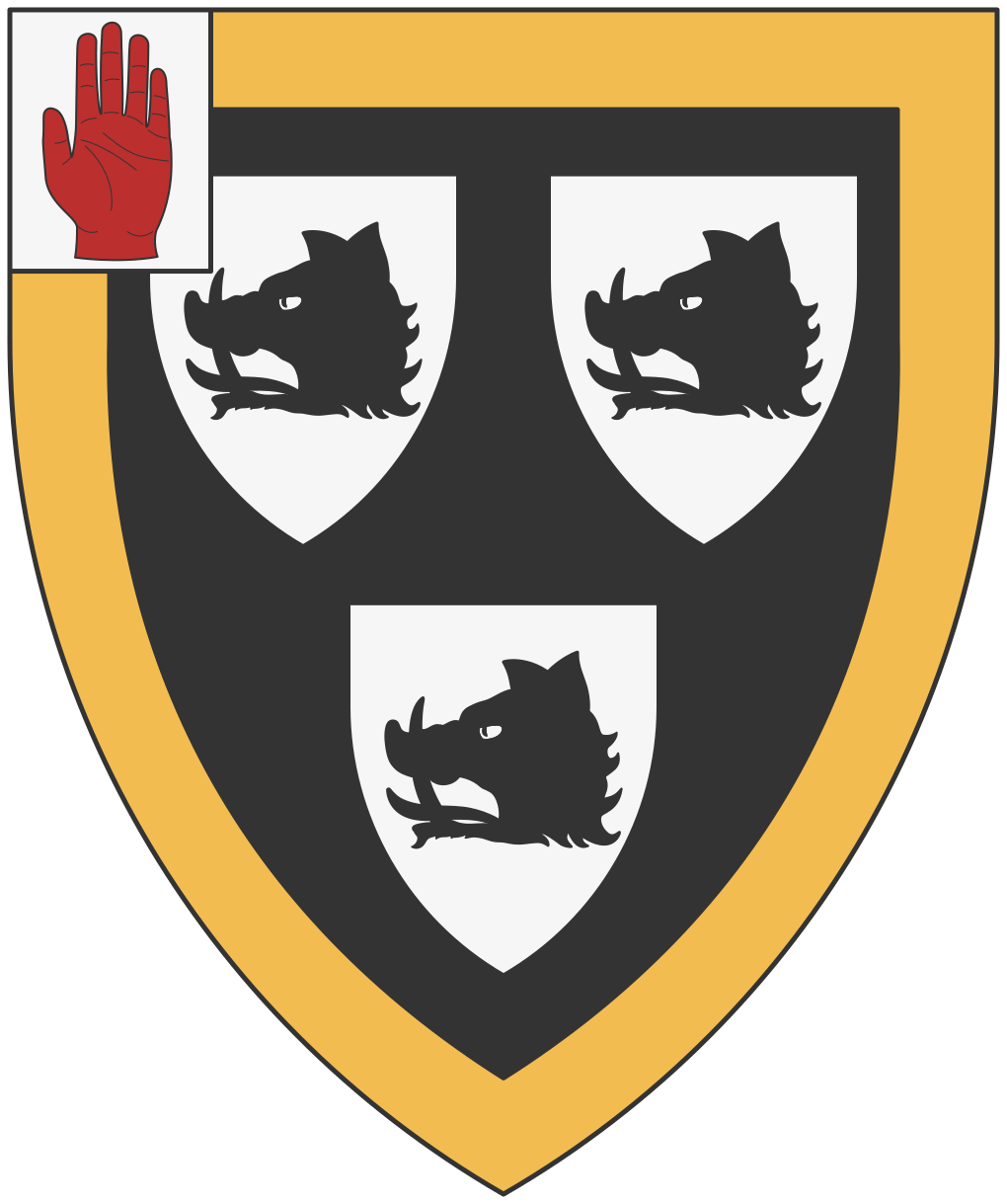
Escutcheon of the Powell baronets of Horton Old Hall

Powell was a member of the Royal Commission on Sanitation and was created a baronet of Horton Old Hall on 15 June 1892. Powell was a benefactor to Wigan and Sedbergh Schools and was chairman of the governors of Sedbergh for over 35 years.

Powell was elected a member of the council of Selwyn College, Cambridge, in June 1902, and received the freedom of the city of Bradford on 24 October 1902, ″for eminent service rendered to the city during his career″. He was President of the Royal Statistical Society from 1904 to 1905.

Powell died at Horton Old Hall, Yorkshire at the age of 84.

== Family ==
Powell married in 1858 Anne Gregson, second daughter of Matthew Gregson of Toxteth Park, Liverpool. He had no heir to inherit the baronetcy which became extinct on his death.

== Statue ==
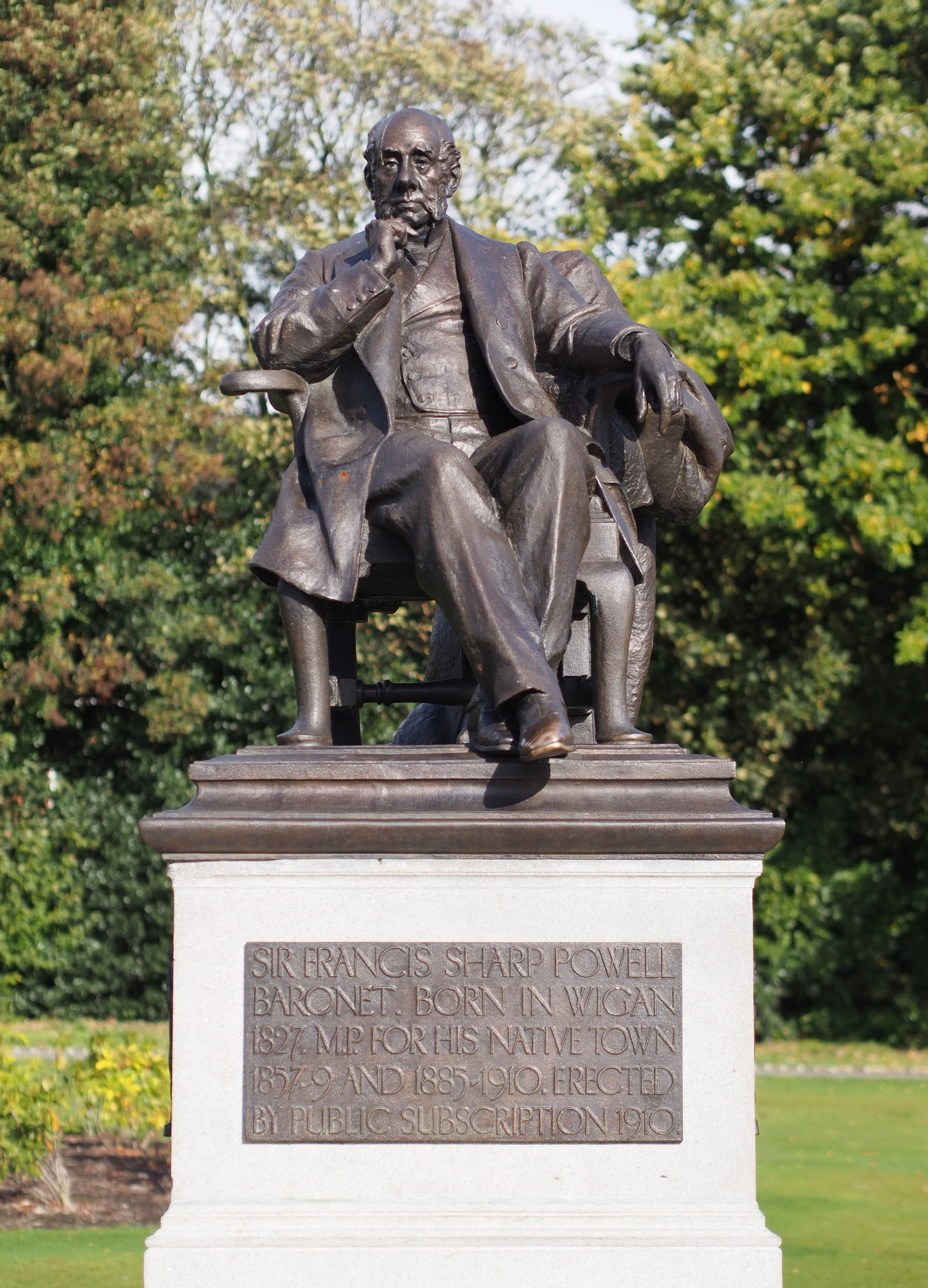
The statue, restored in 2012

Ernest Gillick's statue of Sir Francis Powell stands in Mesnes Park, Wigan. Erected in his home town in 1910, the statue is made from bronze, which after turning green in colour due to lack of treatment, was restored in 2012. The statue shows Powell sat in his office chair, deep in thought. There is a superstition that the rubbing of Powell's protruding right shoe will bring a person good luck.

Parliament of the United Kingdom
Preceded by James Lindsay; Joseph Acton	Member of Parliament for Wigan; 1857–1859; With: Henry Woods	Succeeded by James Lindsay; Henry Woods
Preceded by Andrew Steuart; Kenneth Macaulay	Member of Parliament for Cambridge; 1863–1868; With: Kenneth Macaulay to 1865; William Forsyth 1865–1866; John Eldon Gorst from 1866	Succeeded by Sir Robert Torrens; William Fowler
Preceded by Lord Frederick Cavendish; Sir Francis Crossley, Bt.	Member of Parliament for Northern Division of West Riding, Yorkshire; 1872–1874; With: Lord Frederick Cavendish	Succeeded by Lord Frederick Cavendish; Sir Mathew Wilson, Bt
Preceded by Lord Lindsay; Thomas Knowles	Member of Parliament for Wigan; 1881–1882; With: Thomas Knowles	Vacant seat suspended Title next held by Algernon Fulke Egerton
Preceded by Nathaniel Eckersley; Algernon Fulke Egerton	Member of Parliament for Wigan; 1885–January 1910	Succeeded by Henry Twist
Baronetage of the United Kingdom
New creation	Baronet (of Horton Old Hall); 1892–1911	Extinct
Preceded by Durand baronets	Powell baronets of Horton Old Hall; 15 June 1892 }	Succeeded by Wiggin baronets
