= Nathaniel Eckersley =

British Member of Parliament

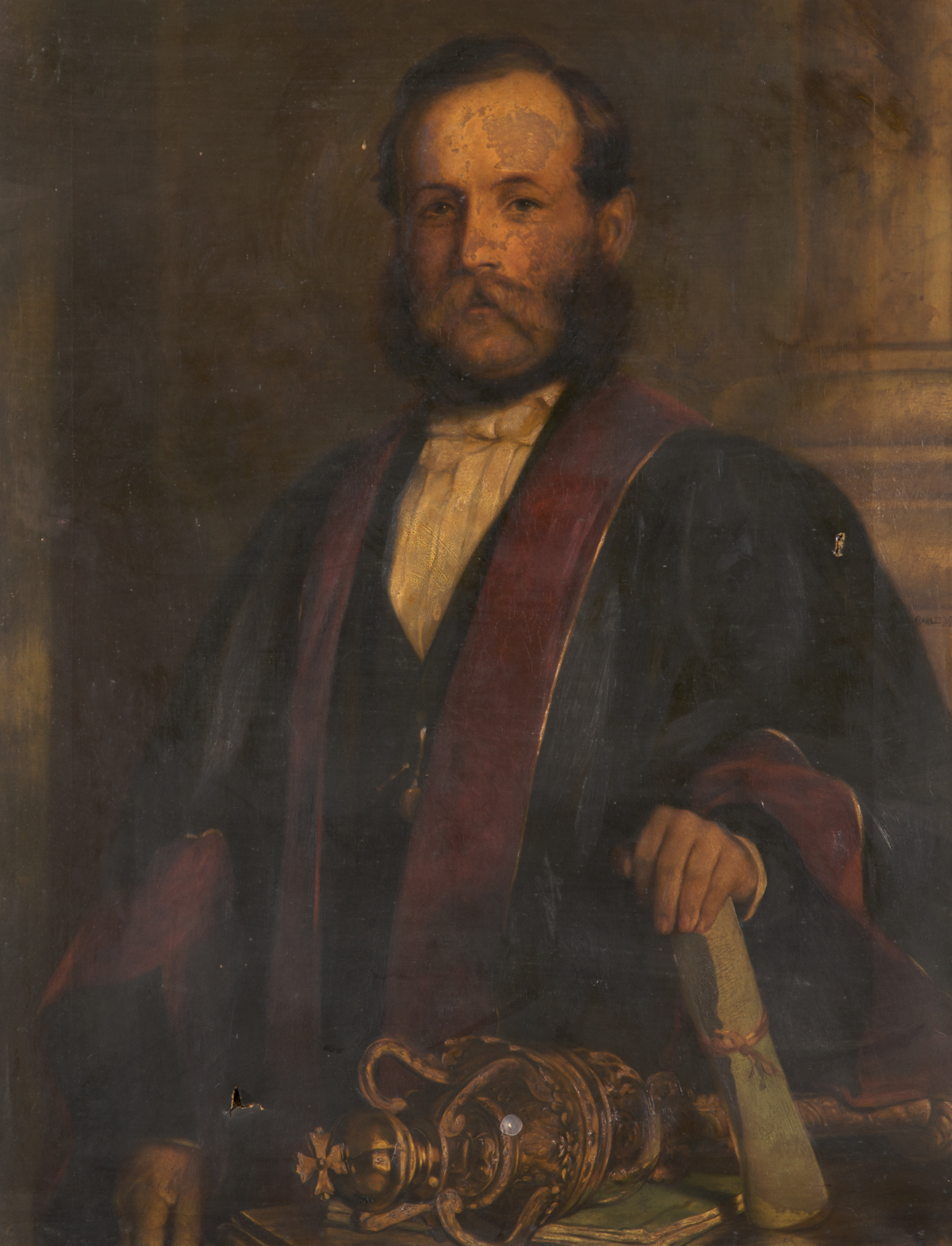
- 1869 painting of Eckersley by Charles Mercier

Member of Parliament for Wigan
- In office 27 March 1866 – 7 December 1868
- Preceded by: Hon. James Lindsay; Henry Woods
- Succeeded by: John Lancaster; Henry Woods
- In office 21 December 1883 – 18 December 1885
- Preceded by: Thomas Knowles; Algernon Egerton
- Succeeded by: Francis Powell

Personal details
- Born: 1815
- Died: 15 February 1892 (aged 76–77)
- Party: Conservative

Nathaniel Eckersley (1815 – 15 February 1892) was an English mill-owner, banker and Conservative Party politician from Standish Hall, near Wigan in Lancashire. He sat in the House of Commons for three years in the 1860s, and two years in the 1880s.

== Career ==
His uncle was Colonel Nathaniel Eckersley, from Laurel House in Hindley, who served with the Duke of Wellington and at the military station established in Manchester after the Peterloo Massacre.

In addition to his cotton mills, Eckersley was a partner of the Wigan Old Bank, formerly Thomas Woodock's, Sons and Eckersley, which amalgamated in 1874 with Parr's Banking Company in Warrington. He was Mayor of Wigan in 1853 and in 1873, and was appointed as a Deputy Lieutenant of Lancashire in September 1863.

He was chairman of the Wigan Junction Railways Company.

In January 1860 he raised the 21st (Wigan) Lancashire Rifle Volunteer Corps, drawn mainly from artisans employed by the local collieries and engineering works, officered by local professional men. He commanded the unit as a captain, and was later promoted to major after it joined the 4th Administrative Battalion, Lancashire Rifle Volunteers.

In June 1873 Eckersley led Wigan's welcome for the Prince and Princess of Wales, who opened a new hospital in the town, which the Princess named the Royal Albert Edward Infirmary.

=== Parliament ===
He was elected as one of the two Members of Parliament (MPs) for Wigan at a by-election in March 1866, following the resignation of the Conservative MP Hon. James Lindsay. Nominations for the contest took place in the moot hall in Wigan, supervised by the Mayor Thomas Knowles. The candidates then addressed the voters in the town hall. Eckersley offered himself as a "free and independent candidate", and said that until then he had never considered himself to be a politician. The Mayor called for a show of hands, which he found to be in favour of Eckersley, but a poll was demanded and Eckersley won 411 votes to the 349 cast for his Liberal opponent John Lancaster.

He was defeated at by John Lancaster (MP) at the 1868 general election, when Liberal candidates took both seats in Wigan, and he did not stand for Parliament again for another 15 years.

He was High Sheriff of Lancashire in 1878, and in that capacity helped to organise a fund for the dependants of the victims of the explosion on 7 June 1878 at the Wood Pit Colliery in Haydock, where more than 200 miners were killed.

When Wigan's Conservative MP Lord Lindsay succeeded to his father's peerage in 1880, and Eckersley was asked to stand at the by-election in January 1881, but refused. Following the death in December 1883 of Wigan's other Conservative MP Thomas Knowles, Eckersley was returned unopposed at the resulting by-election on 21 December 1883. He held the seat until when Wigan's parliamentary representation was reduced from two seats to one by the Redistribution of Seats Act 1885, and did not contest the 1885 general election.

Parliament of the United Kingdom
Preceded by Hon. James Lindsay; Henry Woods	Member of Parliament for Wigan; 1866 – 1868; With: Henry Woods	Succeeded by John Lancaster; Henry Woods
Preceded by Thomas Knowles; Algernon Egerton	Member of Parliament for Wigan; 1883 – 1885; With: Algernon Egerton	Succeeded by Francis Powell
Honorary titles
Preceded by George Marton	High Sheriff of Lancashire; 1878	Succeeded by William Garnett
