= James Lindsay (British Army officer) =

British military officer and politician

Lieutenant-General The Honourable Sir James Lindsay KCMG
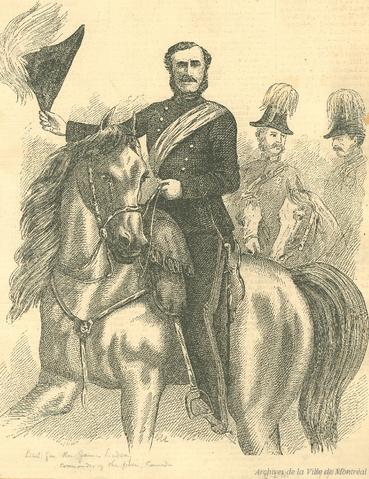
- Born: 25 August 1815; Muncaster Castle, Cumbria
- Died: 13 August 1874 (aged 58); Mitcham, London
- Military career
- Allegiance: United Kingdom
- Branch: British Army
- Service years: 1832–1874
- Rank: Lieutenant-General
- Commands: British Troops in Canada; Brigade of Guards
- Conflicts: Red River Rebellion
- Awards: Knight Commander of the Order of St Michael and St George

Lieutenant-General Sir James Alexander Lindsay, KCMG (25 August 1815 – 13 August 1874) was a British Army officer, Conservative Party politician, and member of Clan Lindsay.

== Career ==
Born at Muncaster Castle in 1815, James was the second son of James Lindsay, 24th Earl of Crawford. Educated at Eton, Lindsay was commissioned an ensign in the Grenadier Guards on 16 March 1832.

He was returned as Member of Parliament (MP) for Wigan at a by-election in October 1845, and held the seat until he was defeated at the 1857 general election. He regained the seat at the 1859 election. Promoted lieutenant colonel in 1860, he was commanding the Brigade of Guards in London in 1861. He then served as a major general on the staff in Canada from 1863 to 1867. During this period, in March 1866, he resigned from Parliament by becoming Steward of the Manor of Northstead.

Lindsay served as Major General commanding the Brigade of Guards from 1867 to 1868, and inspector general of reserve forces from 1868 to 1870. He was seconded from this command to serve as Commander of the British Troops in Canada during the Red River Rebellion, and organised the force of the Wolseley Expedition. On 15 September 1870, he was appointed to the colonelcy of The Buffs. He was promoted to lieutenant general on 10 October 1870. For his services in Canada, Lindsay was made a Knight Commander of the Order of St Michael and St George on 22 December 1870. Lindsay died at Cranmer House, Mitcham in 1874.

== Family ==
Lindsay married Lady Sarah Elizabeth Savile, the daughter of John Savile, 3rd Earl of Mexborough, on 6 November 1845. They had six children:

- James Greville Lindsay (31 January 1847 – 4 April 1848), died in infancy
- Maude Isabel Lindsay (26 May 1848 – 30 November 1916), died unmarried
- Mabel Lindsay (21 December 1849 – 12 June 1928), married in 1877 Lt.-Col. William John Frecheville Ramsden
- Mary Egidia Lindsay (27 August 1851 – 1 July 1911), married in 1875 John Coutts Antrobus, son of Gibbs Antrobus
- Reginald Dalrymple Lindsay (8 June 1853 – 14 August 1853), died in infancy

Military offices
Preceded by Lord Frederick Paulet	Major-General commanding the Brigade of Guards; 1867–1868	Succeeded by Sir Frederick Hamilton
Preceded by Sir Charles Doyle	Commander of the British Troops in Canada; March 1870 – September 1870	Succeeded by Sir Charles Doyle
Preceded by Day Hort MacDowall	Colonel of the 3rd (the East Kent) Regiment of Foot; 1870–1874	Succeeded by William Craig Emilius Napier
Parliament of the United Kingdom
Preceded by Peter Greenall; Charles Strickland Standish	Member of Parliament for Wigan; 1845–1857; With: Charles Strickland Standish 1845–1847; Ralph Anthony Thicknesse 1847–1854; Joseph Acton 1854–1857	Succeeded by Francis Powell; Henry Woods
Preceded by Francis Powell; Henry Woods	Member of Parliament for Wigan; 1859–1866; With: Henry Woods	Succeeded by Henry Woods; Nathaniel Eckersley
