= John Lancaster (MP) =

English Liberal politician

John Lancaster (1816 – 21 April 1884) was an English Liberal politician who sat in the House of Commons from 1868 to 1874.

Lancaster was the son of John Lancaster of Prestwich, Lancashire. He was engaged in the coal and iron trades and was chairman of the Lancashire Union Railway. He was a JP for Lancashire and a Fellow of the Geological Society.

In 1865 Lancaster stood unsuccessfully for Parliament at Wigan. At the 1868 general election he was elected Member of Parliament for Wigan. He held the seat until 1874.

Lancaster died at the age of 67. The Graphic of Saturday, 26 April 1884 recorded

"Mr. John LANCASTER, formerly M.P., for Wigan, who rose from humble beginnings to the ownership of the great mines of Nantyglo Blaina, Monmouthshire. The captain and several of the crew of the 'Alabama', after its engagement with the 'Kearsarge', off Cherbourg, in 1864, were rescued by Mr. LANCASTER, who, to save them, exposed his yacht to the fire of the Federal war-steamer."

This refers to the Battle of Cherbourg in the American Civil War in which the Union sloop USS Kearsarge sank the Confederate raider CSS Alabama. In the aftermath, Lancaster, having observed the battle on his personal steam yacht Deerhound, managed to rescue Captain Raphael Semmes, his officers, and a handful of crewmen; his status as a civilian and a member of Parliament enabled him to spirit the defeated Confederates to safety before they could be captured. The survivors were able to return home, with Semmes quickly returning to active service in the Confederate navy.

In 1841 Lancaster married Euphemia Gibson, daughter of D. Gibson of Renfrewshire.

Parliament of the United Kingdom
Preceded by Nathaniel Eckersley; Henry Woods	Member of Parliament for Wigan; 1868 – 1874; With: Henry Woods	Succeeded by Lord Lindsay; Thomas Knowles
