= Ralph Anthony Thicknesse =

British Whig politician, died 1854

Member of Parliament for Wigan
- In office 28 July 1847 – 22 August 1854 Serving with James Lindsay
- Preceded by: James Lindsay; Charles Strickland Standish
- Succeeded by: James Lindsay; Joseph Acton

Personal details
- Born: 1800
- Died: 22 August 1854 (aged 54)
- Party: Whig

Ralph Anthony Thicknesse (1800 – 22 August 1854) was a British Whig politician.

Thicknesse was first elected Whig MP for Wigan at the 1847 general election and held the seat until his death in 1854.

Parliament of the United Kingdom
Preceded by James Lindsay; Charles Strickland Standish	Member of Parliament for Wigan; 1847–1854; With: James Lindsay	Succeeded by James Lindsay; Joseph Acton
