= Henry Woods (MP) =

English cotton manufacturer, colliery owner and Liberal Party politician

Henry Woods (1822 – 16 May 1882) was an English cotton manufacturer and colliery owner and a Liberal Party politician who sat in the House of Commons from 1857 to 1874.

Woods was the son of William Woods of Wigan and his wife Elizabeth Marsden, daughter of Jonathan Marsden. He was a cotton manufacturer at Wigan, and a colliery owner. He was Deputy Lieutenant and J.P. for Lancashire.

At the 1857 general election Woods was elected as a Member of Parliament (MP) for Wigan. He held the seat until 1874.

Woods died at the age of 59.

Woods married firstly in 1854 Hannah Hindley daughter of Charles Hindley MP of Portland House, Ashton-under-Lyne. She died in 1857 and he married secondly in 1864, Henrietta Emma Gilbert, daughter of Ashurst Gilbert, Bishop of Chichester.

Parliament of the United Kingdom
Preceded by Joseph Acton; James Lindsay	Member of Parliament for Wigan; 1857 – 1874; With: Francis Sharp Powell 1857–1859; James Lindsay 1859–1866; Nathaniel Eckersley 1866–1868; John Lancaster 1868–1874	Succeeded by Thomas Knowles; James Lindsay, Lord Lindsay
