= Thomas Knowles =

English businessman and Conservative politician

Thomas Knowles (30 May 1824 – 3 December 1883) was an English businessman and Conservative politician who sat in the House of Commons from 1874 to 1883.

Knowles was born at Ince-in-Makerfield, the son of a colliery underlooker. According to his obituary, he began work at the age of nine, working up to fifteen hours a day for wages of half-a-crown a week, from which his father allowed him threepence a week pocket money. He spent two of the three pence on night school fees and rose through the ranks; collier, then underlooker, then (in 1847) colliery manager at Ince Colliery. In 1854, he became a partner in the colliery (then employing 200); when in 1873 the colliery (together with an associated ironworks at Warrington) became a limited liability company, Knowles became its chairman.

Knowles was in business in Lancashire with interests in coal mining, cotton spinning and bleaching. He was chairman of Pearson and Knowles Coal and Iron Company and served for two years as chairman of the Mining Association of Great Britain. He was also a director of the London and North Western Railway, and of the Manchester and Liverpool District Banking Company. He was a J.P. for Lancashire and Cheshire. In 1864 and 1865, he was Mayor of Wigan.

At the 1874 general election Knowles was elected member of parliament for Wigan. He held the seat until his death at the age of 59 in 1883.

Knowles married firstly Mary Foster in 1846 and secondly Mary Longworth in 1866, daughter of William Longworth of Little Bolton, Lancashire. The brothers Thomas Fielden and Edward Brocklehurst Fielden, both themselves Members of Parliament, were sons-in-law

Parliament of the United Kingdom
Preceded by Henry Woods; John Lancaster	Member of Parliament for Wigan; 1874 – 1883; With: Lord Lindsay to 1881; Francis Powell 1881; Writ suspended 1881–1882; Hon. Algernon Fulke Egerton from 1882	Succeeded by Nathaniel Eckersley; Hon. Algernon Fulke Egerton
