= Joseph Acton (MP) =

British politician (1803–1862)

Member of Parliament for Wigan
- In office 3 October 1854 – 28 March 1857 Serving with James Alexander Lindsay
- Preceded by: James Alexander Lindsay; Ralph Anthony Thicknesse
- Succeeded by: Francis Powell; Henry Woods

Personal details
- Born: 1803
- Died: 8 December 1862 (aged 59)
- Party: Whig

Joseph Acton (1803 – 8 December 1862) was a British Whig politician.

Acton was first elected Whig MP for Wigan at a by-election in 1854–caused by the death of Ralph Anthony Thicknesse–and held the seat until 1857 when he did not seek re-election.

Parliament of the United Kingdom
Preceded by James Lindsay; Ralph Anthony Thicknesse	Member of Parliament for Wigan; 1854–1857; With: James Alexander Lindsay	Succeeded by Francis Powell; Henry Woods
