= James Lindsay, 26th Earl of Crawford =

Scottish astronomer and philatelist (1847–1913))

The Right Honourable The Earl of Crawford and Balcarres KT FRS FRAS
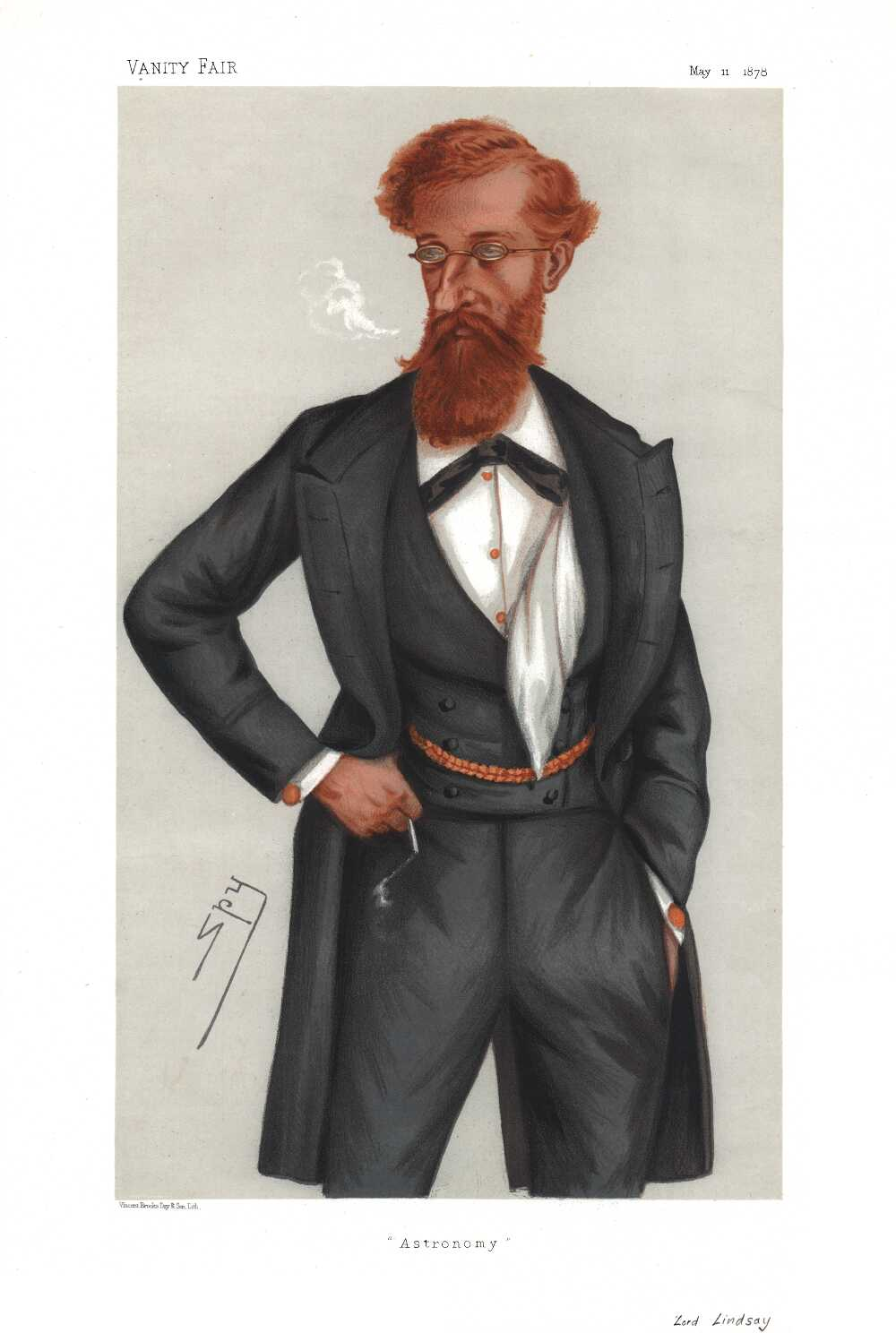
- Caricature of Lord Crawford by Leslie Ward

Member of Parliament for Wigan
- In office 1874–1881 Serving with Thomas Knowles
- Preceded by: John Lancaster; Henry Woods
- Succeeded by: Francis Sharp Powell; Thomas Knowles

Personal details
- Born: James Ludovic Lindsay; 28 July 1847 Saint-Germain-en-Laye, France
- Died: 31 January 1913 (aged 65)
- Party: Conservative
- Spouse: Emily Florence Bootle-Wilbraham (m. 1869–1913)
- Children: 7
- Parent(s): Alexander Lindsay, 25th Earl of Crawford; Margaret
- Education: University of Edinburgh

James Ludovic Lindsay, 26th Earl of Crawford and 9th Earl of Balcarres, KT, FRS, FRAS (28 July 1847 – 31 January 1913) was a Scottish astronomer, politician, ornithologist, bibliophile, and philatelist. A member of the Royal Society, Crawford was elected president of the Royal Astronomical Society in 1878. He was a prominent Freemason, having been initiated into Isaac Newton University Lodge at the University of Cambridge in 1866.

== Early life ==
The future Earl was born at Saint-Germain-en-Laye, France on 28 July 1847, the only son of Alexander Lindsay, 25th Earl of Crawford and his wife Margaret. He was asthmatic and spent considerable periods at sea studying the more portable sections of the family library which had been established by his father. (Note: Crawford was a member of the Royal Yacht Squadron and owner of several private yachts that he used for scientific expeditions, most famously the 1490 ton Valhalla (see below "Further reading").)

== Astronomy ==
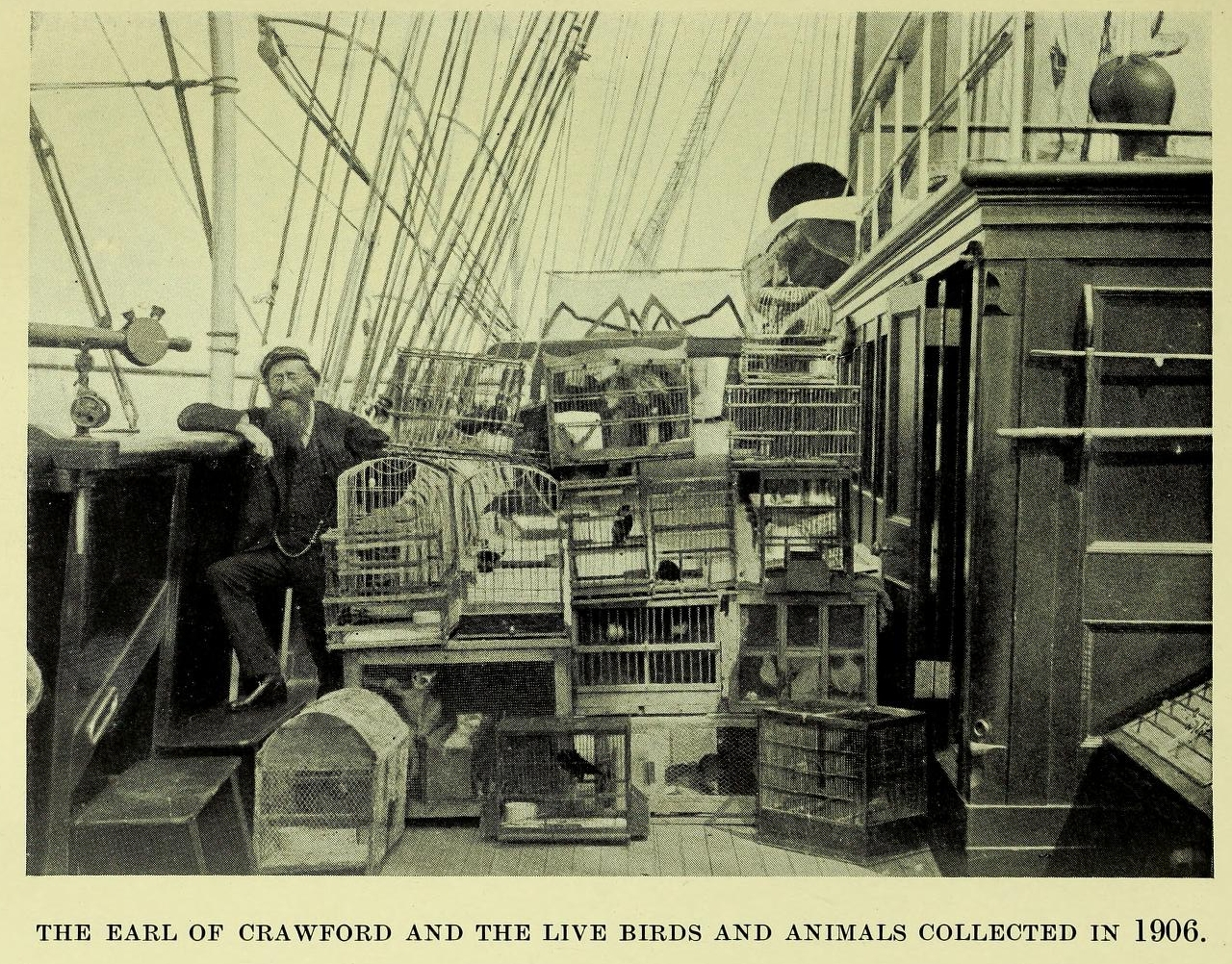
Lord Crawford aboard his yacht Valhalla in 1906

Crawford was interested in astronomy from an early age. Along with his father, he built up a private observatory at Dun Echt, Aberdeenshire. He employed David Gill to equip the observatory, using the best available technology. Among his achievements, Gill later made the first photograph of the Great Comet of 1882, pioneering astrophotography and the mapping of the heavens. Crawford mounted expeditions to Cádiz in 1870, to observe the eclipse of the sun; India in 1871, to observe the eclipse of the sun; and then to Mauritius in 1874, to observe the transit of Venus. On the latter two expeditions Crawford employed London photographer Henry Davis, who in 1876 was appointed Crawford's personal librarian.

Upon hearing of a threat to close down the Edinburgh Royal Observatory, in 1888 Crawford made a donation of astronomical instruments and his books on mathematics and the physical sciences from the Bibliotheca Lindesiana in order that a new observatory could be founded. Thanks to this donation, the new Royal Observatory, Edinburgh was opened on Blackford Hill in 1896.

As well as much astronomical equipment, Crawford's observatory included an extensive collection of rare books, part of the Bibliotheca Lindesiana at Haigh Hall, which his father and he had accumulated till it was one of the most impressive private collections in Britain at the time.

== The Bibliotheca Lindesiana ==
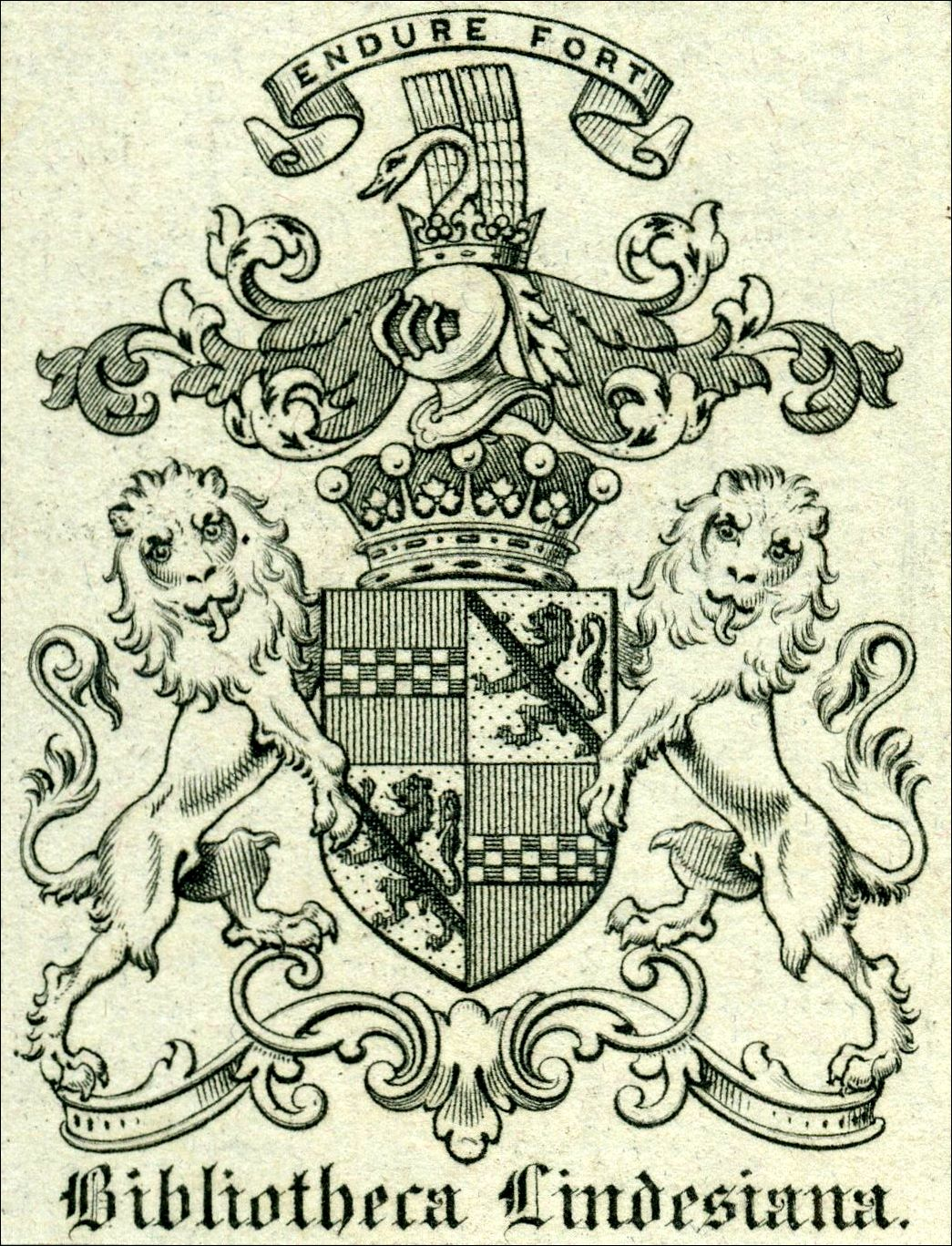
A book plate from the Bibliotheca Lindesiana

The Bibliotheca Lindesiana (i.e. Lindsayan or Lindsian library) had been planned by the 25th Earl and both he and his eldest son had been instrumental in building it up to such an extent that it was one of the most impressive private collections in Britain at the time, both for its size and for the rarity of some of the materials it contained. Alexander William Lindsay had been a book collector from his schooldays and so he continued. In 1861 he wrote to his son James (then 14 years old) a letter which describes his vision of the Bibliotheca Lindesiana; in 1864 he redrafted and enlarged it while visiting his villa in Tuscany. By now it was 250 pages long and under the name of the "Library Report" it continued to be added to during their lifetimes. He based his plan on the Manuel of J.-Ch. Brunet in which knowledge is divided into five branches: Theology, Jurisprudence, Science and Arts, Belles Lettres, History; to which Alexander added six of his own as paralipomena: Genealogy, Archaeology, Biography, Literary History, Bibliography and Encyclopaedias; and finally a Museum. Features of the collection included reacquired stock from earlier Lindsay collections, manuscripts both eastern and western, and printed books, all chosen for their intellectual and cultural importance.

The bulk of the library was kept at Haigh Hall in Lancashire with a part at Balcarres House in Fife. The Earl issued an extensive catalogue of the library in 1910: Catalogue of the Printed Books Preserved at Haigh Hall, Wigan, 4 vols. folio, Aberdeen University Press, printers. Companion volumes to the catalogue record the royal proclamations and philatelic literature. The cataloguing and organisation of the library was a major task for a team of librarians led by J. P. Edmond. Two catalogues were issued privately in 1895 and 1898, of the Chinese books and manuscripts (by J. P. Edmond) and of the Oriental manuscripts, Arabic, Persian, Turkish (by Michael Kerney). The manuscript collections (including Chinese and Japanese printed books) were sold in 1901 to Enriqueta Augustina Rylands for the John Rylands Library. Other parts of the collections have since been donated to or deposited in national or university libraries, including the National Library of Scotland. In 1946 the deposited collections were distributed to the British Museum, Cambridge University Library, and the John Rylands Library. Changes to these locations were made by later Earls of Crawford; apart from the Crawford family muniments those at the John Rylands Library were removed in 1988.

== Philately ==
Crawford's philatelic interests grew out of his work in extending the Lindsay family's library. He purchased a large collection of philatelic literature formed by John K. Tiffany of St. Louis, the first president of the American Philatelic Society. Tiffany's was already the world's largest and most complete collection of philatelic literature. He added to this by purchases throughout Europe. He added a codicil to his will bequeathing his philatelic library to the British Museum, of which he was a Trustee.

Crawford formed notable collections of the stamps of the Italian States, the United States and Great Britain. The Crawford Medal was established by the Royal Philatelic Society London in Crawford's honour for distinguished contributions to philately. It is awarded annually for "the most valuable and original contribution to the study and knowledge of philately published in book form during the two years preceding the award". The 26th Earl of Crawford by the time of his death in 1913 had amassed the greatest philatelic library of his time. Crawford's name was included as one of the "Fathers of Philately" in 1921.

== Politics ==
Crawford was elected as a Conservative Member of Parliament for Wigan in 1874, and held the seat until his elevation to the peerage in 1880.

== Military service ==
As a young man of his time and social standing, James Ludovic Lindsay joined his local Volunteer unit, the 8th Aberdeenshire Administrative Battalion, based in Echt. At the time,Volunteer officers were elected by the men of the company and Lindsay was duly elected lieutenant on 2 August 1864. Four years later, on 24 June 1868, he advanced to the rank of captain and became captain-commandant of the unit.

In August of the same year, Lindsay purchased a commission as an ensign in the 2nd Battalion of the Grenadier Guards.Subsequently, his name appeared twice in the Army Lists until mid-1869, reflecting his simultaneous association with both the Volunteers and the regular army.. After resigning from the Grenadier Guards, he rejoined the Volunteers, this time he joined the 4th Administrative Battalion based in Manchester. This battalion administered eight Lancashire Volunteer Corps, such as the 21st (Wigan), 55th (Leigh) and the 60th (Atherton). His progression through the ranks was rapid. He was promoted to major in 1873. Two years later, in 1875, the 4th Administrative Battalion expanded, and the number of companies increased. This increase was reflected in the officer ranks with the introduction of honorary colonel and increasing the number of lieutenant-colonels within the battalion to two. Crawford was promoted to lieutenant-colonel on 10 May 1875. Under his tenure, despite opposition from the Manchester-based Volunteer Corps, the 4th Administrative Battalion applied to change its name to the 4th Lancashire Rifle Volunteer Corps and it relocated its headquarters from Manchester to Wigan. His brother-in-law Arthur Bootle-Wilbraham, a former ensign in the Coldstream Guards, became the other lieutenant colonel. On 10 October 1900 Crawford was appointed honorary colonel of the unit, now the 1st Volunteer Battalion, Manchester Regiment.

== Marriage and children ==
On 22 July 1869, the Earl, who was then Lord Lindsay, married Emily Florence Bootle-Wilbraham (1848–1934), the daughter of Colonel the Hon Edward Bootle-Wilbraham (son of Edward Bootle-Wilbraham, 1st Baron Skelmersdale) and his wife Emily Ramsbottom (daughter of James Ramsbottom, MP, brewer and banker, of Clewer Lodge and Woodside, Windsor, Berkshire) and the sister of Ada Constance Bootle-Wilbraham, wife of Italian politician Onorato Caetani, Duke of Sermoneta and Prince of Teano. Together, James and Emily were the parents of seven children:

- Lady Evelyn Margaret Lindsay (8 May 1870 – 3 April 1944), married James Francis Mason, only son of James Mason of Eynsham Hall, in 1895.
- David Alexander Edward Lindsay, 27th Earl of Crawford (10 October 1871 – 8 March 1940), married Constance Lilian Pelly, second daughter and co-heiress of Sir Henry Pelly, 3rd Baronet, MP, and Lady Lilian Charteris (daughter of Francis Charteris, 10th Earl of Wemyss), in 1900.
- Hon Walter Patrick Lindsay (13 February 1873 – 2 July 1936), married Ruth Henderson, eldest daughter of Isaac Henderson, of Rome, Italy in 1902. They divorced in 1927.
- Major Hon Robert Hamilton Lindsay (30 March 1874 – 8 December 1911), served as aide-de-camp to the Viceroy of India and married Mary Janet Clarke, a daughter of Hon Sir William Clarke, 1st Baronet and Janet Marian Snodgrass (daughter of Hon Peter Snodgrass) in 1903.
- The Reverend Hon Edward Reginald Lindsay (15 March 1876 – 17 June 1951), a barrister and later Curate of St Matthew's, Bethnal Green, died unmarried.
- Rt Hon Sir Ronald Charles Lindsay (3 May 1877 – 21 August 1945), a diplomat who married Martha Cameron, daughter of American Senator J. Donald Cameron.
- Hon Lionel Lindsay (20 July 1879 – 18 August 1965), married his first cousin, Kathleen Yone Kennedy, daughter of Sir John Gordon Kennedy and Evelyn Adela Bootle-Wilbraham.

Lord Crawford died on 31 January 1913. His widow, Emily, Dowager Countess of Crawford, died on 15 January 1934.

Through his eldest son, the 27th Earl, he was a grandfather of eight, two sons and six daughters, including David Lindsay, 28th Earl of Crawford, Hon. James Lindsay (MP for Devon North), Lady Mary Lilian Lindsay (wife of Lord Chancellor Reginald Manningham-Buller, 1st Viscount Dilhorne, whose daughter is Baroness Manningham-Buller), and Lady Katharine Constance Lindsay (wife of Sir Godfrey Nicholson, 1st Baronet, and mother of Baroness Nicholson of Winterbourne).

Through his son Robert, he was a grandfather of Australian politician Robert Lindsay.

== Other positions and honours ==
Lindsay received the degree of LL.D. from the University of Edinburgh in 1882, and in the following year was nominated honorary associate of the Royal Prussian Academy of Sciences. He became a trustee of the British Museum and acted for a term as president of the Library Association.

He had a strong connection to Wigan, where he was chairman of the Free Library Authority and head of the Wigan Coal Company. In January 1900 he received the Freedom of the borough of Wigan.

Crawford was a member of the Council of the Zoological Society of London from 1902.

== Notes ==
Parliament of the United Kingdom
Preceded by John Lancaster; Henry Woods	Member of Parliament for Wigan; 1874–1881; With: Thomas Knowles	Succeeded by Francis Sharp Powell; Thomas Knowles
Professional and academic associations
Preceded by Wilbraham, 2nd Lord Egerton of Tatton	President of the Lancashire and Cheshire Antiquarian Society; 1886–89	Succeeded by William Cunliffe Brooks
Preceded by The King George V	President of the Royal Philatelic Society London; 1910–13	Succeeded by M. P. Castle
Peerage of Scotland
Preceded by Alexander William Crawford Lindsay	Earl of Crawford; Earl of Balcarres; 1880–1913	Succeeded by David Lindsay
