= List of places in Greater Manchester =

Some of the larger settlements of Greater Manchester.

This is a partial list of places in Greater Manchester, in North West England.

== Metropolitan boroughs and components ==
Metropolitan county	Metropolitan borough	Centre of administration	Other components
Greater Manchester	Bury	Bury	Prestwich, Radcliffe, Ramsbottom, Tottington, Whitefield
Greater Manchester	Bolton	Bolton	Blackrod, Farnworth, Horwich, Kearsley, Little Lever, South Turton, Westhoughton
Greater Manchester	Manchester	Manchester	Blackley, Cheetham Hill, Chorlton-cum-Hardy, Didsbury, Beswick, Fallowfield, Hulme, Moss Side, Newton Heath, Northenden, Ringway, Rusholme, Withington, Wythenshawe, Longsight,
Greater Manchester	Oldham	Oldham	Chadderton, Shaw and Crompton, Failsworth, Lees, Royton, Saddleworth
Greater Manchester	Rochdale	Rochdale	Heywood, Littleborough, Middleton, Milnrow, Newhey, Wardle
Greater Manchester	Salford	Swinton	Cadishead, Eccles, Greengate, Pendlebury, Pendleton, Salford, Walkden, Worsley
Greater Manchester	Stockport	Stockport	Bramhall, Bredbury, Cheadle, Gatley, Hazel Grove, Heaton Chapel, Heaton Mersey, Heaton Moor, Heaton Norris, Marple, Marple Bridge, Mellor, Reddish, Romiley
Greater Manchester	Tameside	Ashton-under-Lyne	Audenshaw, Broadbottom, Denton, Droylsden, Dukinfield, Hattersley, Hollingworth, Hyde, Longdendale, Mossley, Mottram-in-Longdendale, Stalybridge
Greater Manchester	Trafford	Stretford	Altrincham, Bowdon, Hale, Old Trafford, Sale, Timperley, Urmston
Greater Manchester	Wigan	Wigan	Abram, Ashton-in-Makerfield, Aspull, Astley, Atherton, Bryn, Golborne, Higher End, Hindley, Ince-in-Makerfield, Leigh, Orrell, Standish, Shevington, Tyldesley, Winstanley

== Bodies of water ==
=== Rivers ===
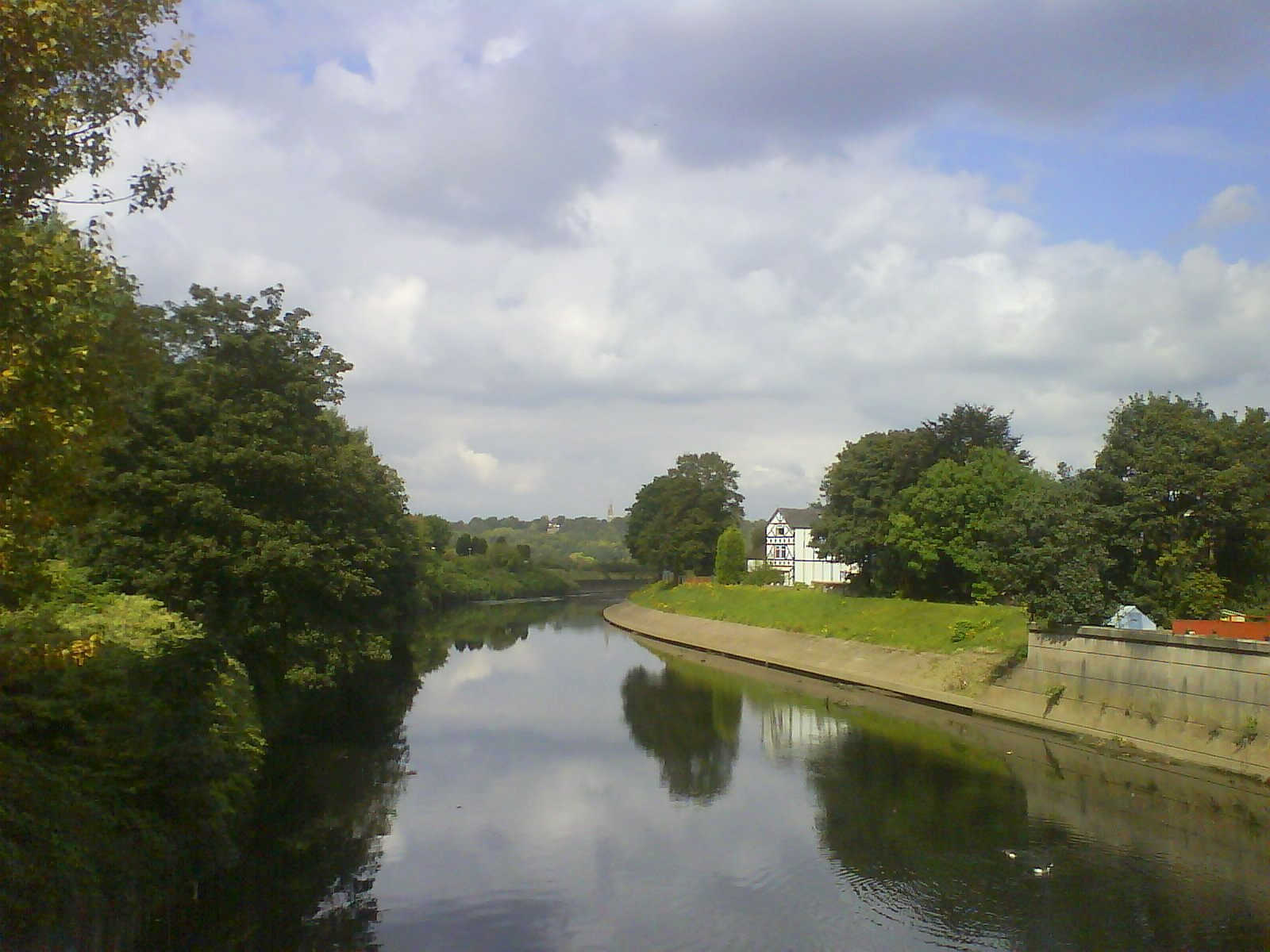
River Irwell in Salford

- River Beal
- River Bollin
- River Croal
- River Douglas
- River Etherow
- River Goyt
- River Irk
- River Irwell
- River Medlock
- River Mersey
- River Roch
- River Spodden
- River Tame
- Glaze Brook
- River Brook

=== Canals ===
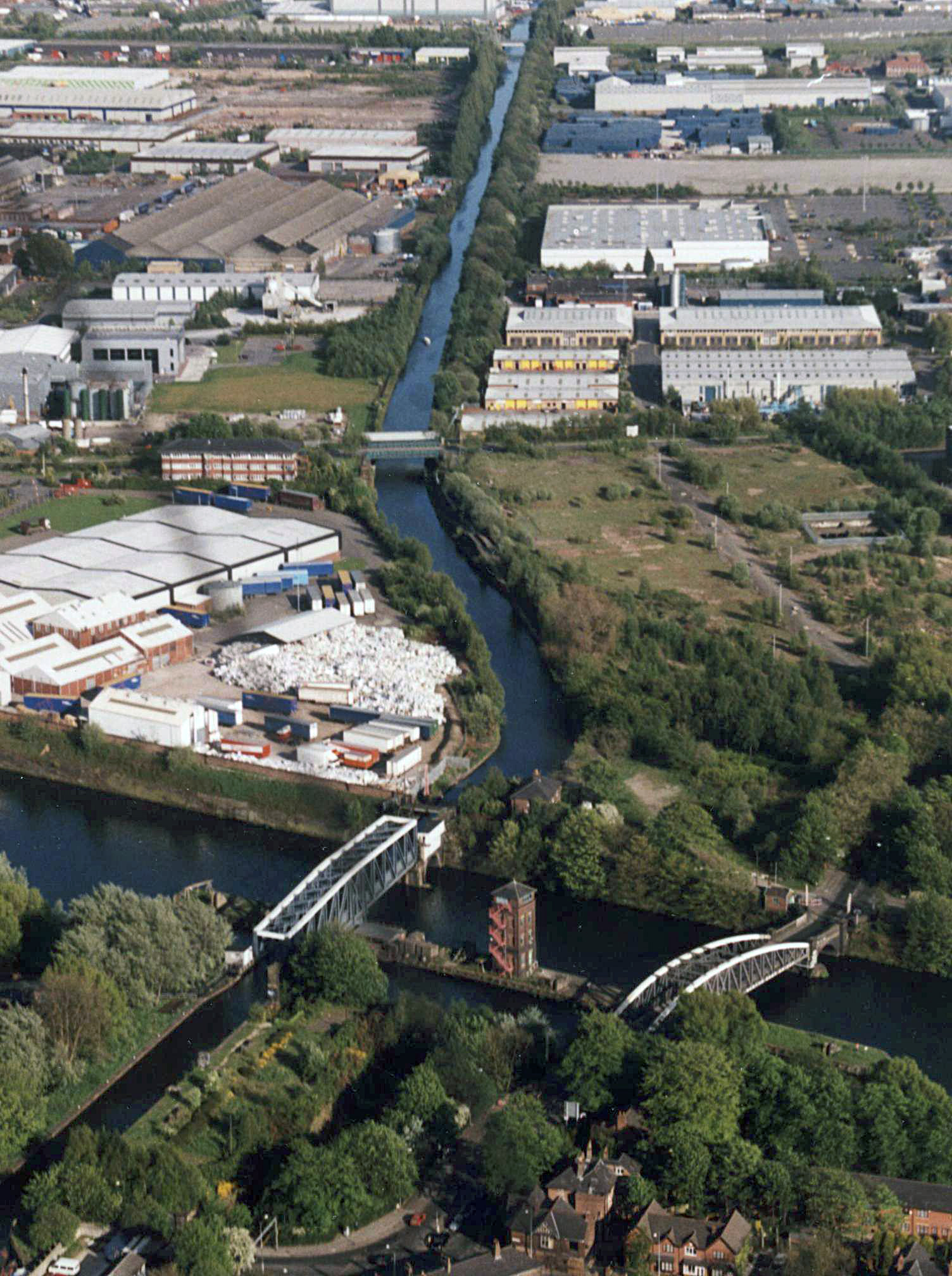
The Bridgewater Canal and the Manchester Ship Canal

- Ashton Canal
- Beat Bank Branch Canal
- Bridgewater Canal
- Fairbottom Branch Canal
- Hollinwood Branch Canal
- Huddersfield Narrow Canal
- Islington Branch Canal
- Leeds and Liverpool Canal
- Manchester Ship Canal
- Manchester, Bolton and Bury Canal
- Peak Forest Canal
- Rochdale Canal
- Stockport Branch Canal

=== Reservoirs ===
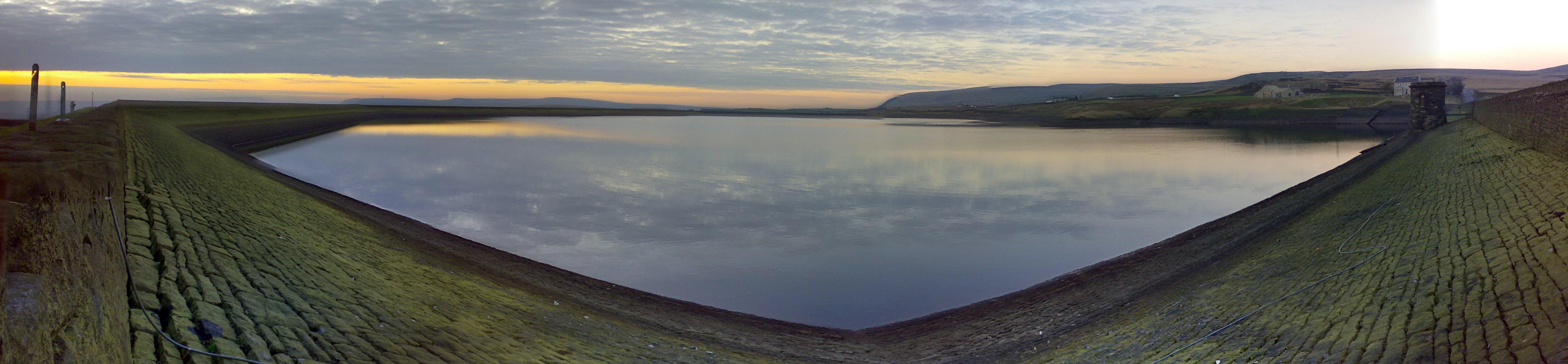
Ashworth Moor Reservoir

- Ashworth Moor Reservoir
- Audenshaw Reservoirs
- Besom Hill Reservoir
- Black Moss Reservoir
- Blackstone Edge Reservoir
- Brownhouse Wham Reservoir
- Brushes Reservoir
- Brushes Clough Reservoir
- Castleshaw Reservoir
- Chelburn Reservoir
- Chew Reservoir
- Crook Gate Reservoir
- Denton Reservoirs
- Diggle Reservoir
- Dovestones Reservoir
- Dowry Reservoir
- Godley Reservoir
- Gorton Reservoirs
- Greenbooth Reservoir
- Greenfield Reservoir
- Hamer Pasture Reservoir
- Hanging Lees Reservoir
- Heaton Park Reservoir
- High Rid Reservoir
- Higher Swineshaw Reservoir
- Hollingworth Lake
- Jumbles Reservoir
- Kitcliffe Reservoir
- Light Hazzles Reservoir
- Lower Chelburn Reservoir
- Lower Swineshaw Reservoir
- Manchester, Bolton and Bury Reservoir
- Naden Reservoirs (Higher, Middle and Lower)
- New Years Bridge Reservoir
- Norman Hill Reservoir
- Ogden Reservoir
- Piethorne Reservoir
- Readycon Dean Reservoir
- Rooden Reservoir
- Rumworth Lodge Reservoir
- Strinesdale Reservoir
- Swineshaw Reservoirs
- Yeoman Hey Reservoir
- Walkerwood Reservoir
- Watergrove Reservoir
- Worthington Lakes

=== Docks ===
- Salford Quays

== Hills, valleys, moorland and mosses ==
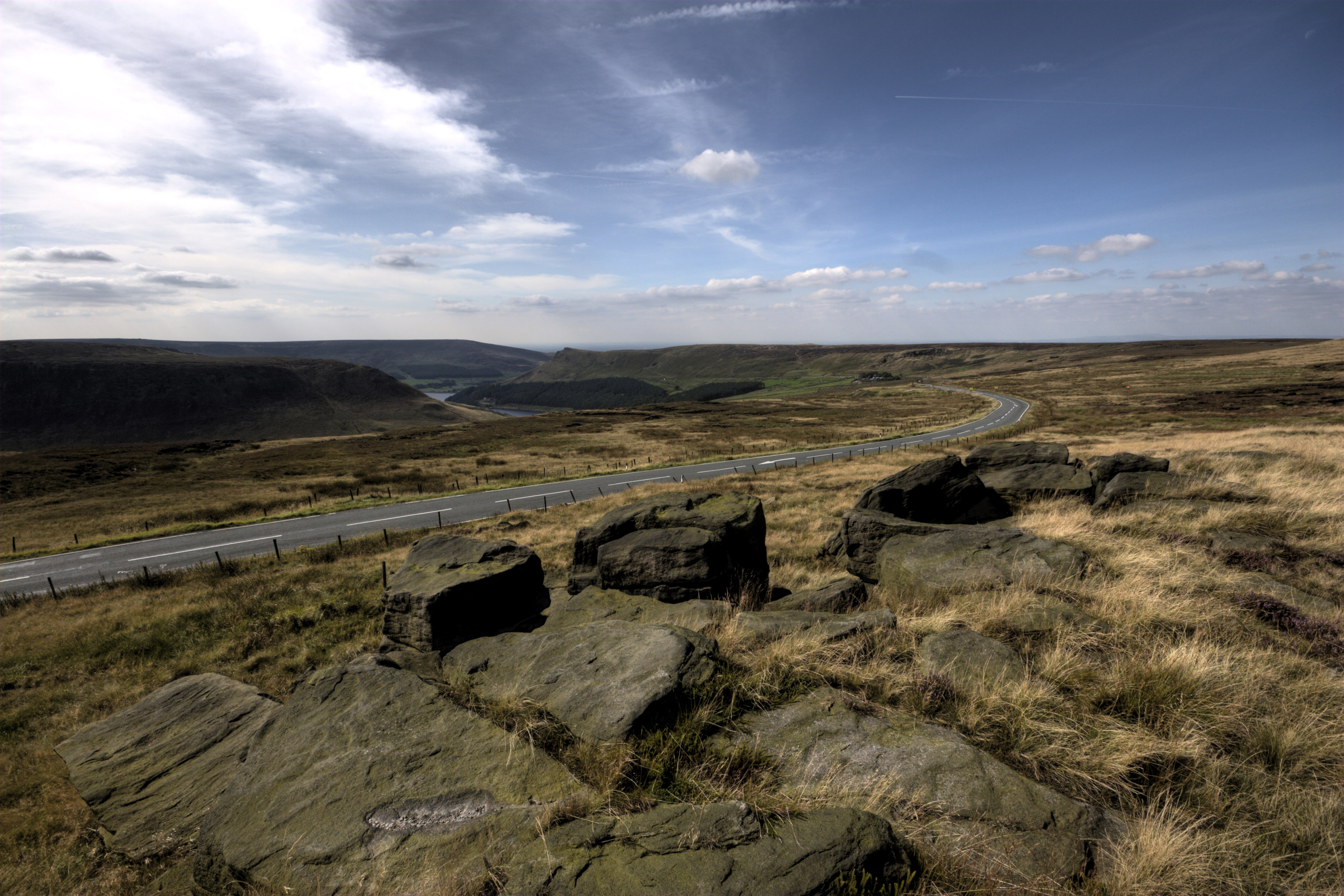
Hollin Brown Knoll on Saddleworth Moor

- Astley and Bedford Mosses
- Black Chew Head
- Blackstone Edge
- Carrington Moss
- Chat Moss
- Chew Valley
- Cheesden Valley
- Crompton Moor
- Harridge Pike
- Hartshead Pike
- Kersal Moor
- Pennine Way
- Red Moss, Greater Manchester
- Saddleworth Moor
- West Pennine Moors
- Wild Bank

== Notable buildings ==
- Buckton Castle
- Bury Castle
- Dunham Castle
- Manchester Castle
- Radcliffe Tower
- Rochdale Castle
- Stockport Castle
- Ullerwood Castle
- Watch Hill Castle

== Places of worship ==
- Manchester Cathedral
- Salford Cathedral
- Gorton Monastery

== Schools and colleges ==
- Manchester Metropolitan University
- University of Bolton
- University of Manchester
- University of Salford

== Roads and streets ==
=== Motorways ===
- M6 motorway
- M60 motorway
- M602 motorway
- M62 motorway
- M67 motorway
- A57(M) motorway (Mancunian Way)

=== Notable roads ===
- Wilmslow Road

== Parks, commons and open space ==
- Alexandra Park, Manchester
- Alexandra Park, Oldham
- Ardwick Green
- Birchfields Park, Manchester
- Boggart Hole Clough
- Cale Green Park
- Chadderton Hall Park
- Chorlton Water Park
- Clayton Vale
- Crumpsall Park
- Fletcher Moss Botanical Garden
- Heaton Park
- Kersal Moor
- Leverhulme Park
- Mesnes Park
- Peel Park, Salford
- Philips Park, Clayton
- Platt Fields Park, Manchester
- Queen's Park, Bolton
- Sale Water Park
- Whitworth Gardens
- Whitworth Park, Manchester

=== Country parks ===
- Borsdane Wood
- Burrs Country Park
- Clifton Country Park; Clifton Marina
- Daisy Nook
- Haigh Country Park
- Jumbles Country Park
- Moses Gate Country Park
- Pennington Flash Country Park
- Tandle Hill

=== Squares and gardens ===
- Cathedral Gardens
- Piccadilly Gardens
- St Michael's Flags and Angel Meadow Park
- Sackville Gardens on Whitworth Street

=== Cemeteries ===
- Agecroft Cemetery
- Blackley Cemetery
- Southern Cemetery, Manchester
- Weaste Cemetery

== Public transport ==
=== Airports ===
- Barton Aerodrome
- Manchester Airport
