= List of castles in Greater Manchester =

Map of Greater Manchester with the locations of castles: 1. Buckton Castle; 2. Bury Castle; 3. Dunham Castle; 4. Manchester Castle; 5. Radcliffe Tower; 6. Rochdale Castle; 7. Stockport Castle; 8. Ullerwood Castle; 9. Watch Hill Castle

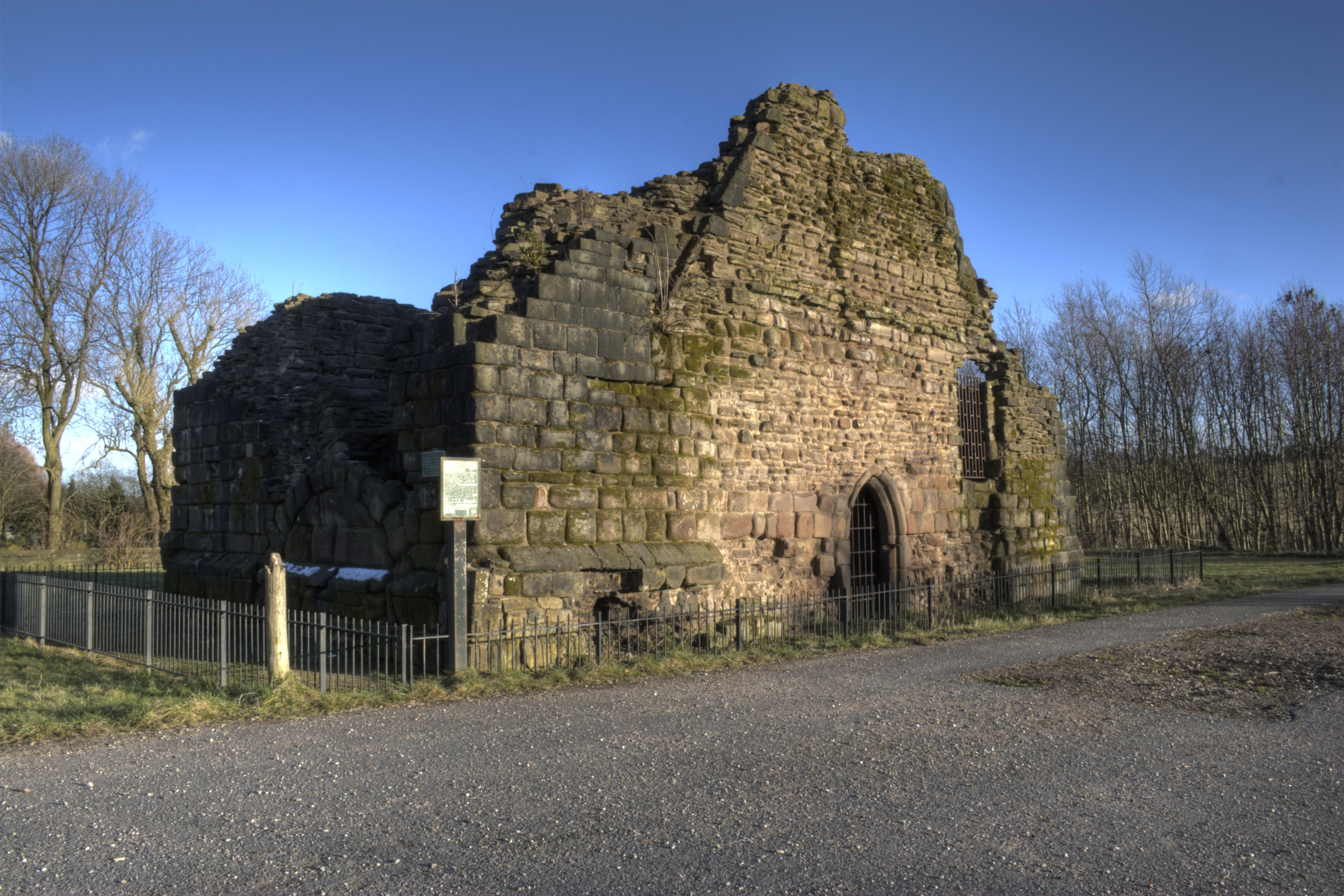
Radcliffe Tower is one of three fortified manor houses in Greater Manchester.

There are nine castles in Greater Manchester, a metropolitan county in North West England. They comprise four motte-and-bailey castles, three fortified manor houses, an enclosure castle, and a possible shell keep. A motte-and-bailey castle is characterised by two elements: the motte is an artificial mound with a wooden stockade and stronghold on top, usually a stone keep or tower, while the bailey is a defended enclosure adjacent to the motte, typically enclosed by a ditch and a bank topped by a timber palisade or stone wall. Motte-and-bailey castles were the most common type of castle in England following the Norman Conquest. A shell keep was a motte with a stone wall rather than a wooden stockade on top, and would not have contained a tower within the walls. Four of Greater Manchester's castles are scheduled monuments: Buckton, Bury, Radcliffe Tower, and Watch Hill. A scheduled monument is a "nationally important" archaeological site or historic building, given protection against unauthorised change.

The purpose of a castle was not solely militaristic; it was also a stamp of authority over the local population and a symbol of status. Some castles would have served as centres of trade and administration for a manor. The earliest castles in Greater Manchester are Dunham and Watch Hill in Trafford, Ullerwood in Manchester, and Stockport Castle in Stockport. Dunham, Ullerwood, and Stockport castles were first recorded in 1173 as belonging to barons who had rebelled against Henry II, and Watch Hill likely dates from the same period. At least three of these sites were motte-and-bailey castles, probably because of the speed and ease with which they could be erected. Hamon de Massey, who owned the Trafford castles and Ullerwood, and Geoffrey de Constentyn, who owned Stockport Castle, were two of the three rebels from Cheshire; the third was the Earl of Chester, the owner of Chester Castle.

Castles continued to be built in the area, although the last to be constructed in Greater Manchester were two fortified manor houses near Bury, built more for comfort than as utilitarian military structures. Bury Castle and Radcliffe Tower followed the national trend in the 13th century and would most likely have acted as the centres of the manors they served.

== List of castles ==
Castle	Location	Type	Constructed	Scheduled	Notes
Buckton Castle	Buckton Hill, Carrbrook; SD98920162	Enclosure castle	1180s	Yes	The castle overlooks the Tame Valley, a position that may have allowed it to control movement through the valley. It was probably built by the earls of Chester in the 12th century and was first recorded in 1360, by which time it was already ruinous. The structure consisted of a stone curtain wall and is surrounded by a ditch 10 metres (33 ft) wide and 6 metres (20 ft) deep; the enclosed area covers about 730 square metres (0.18 acres). The remains have been disturbed by 18th-century treasure hunters, and the site is close to Buckton Vale Quarry.
Bury Castle	Bury; SD803108	Fortified manor house	1469	Yes	The castle is on a slope overlooking the River Irwell in the centre of modern Bury. It is a fortified stone manor house built for Sir Thomas Pilkington. The castle may have replaced an earlier moated house on the site. Excavations have revealed foundation walls measuring 180 metres (590 ft) by 82 metres (269 ft), and a keep or tower 25 metres (82 ft) by 19 metres (62 ft). Bury Castle was razed after the Wars of the Roses, when Thomas Pilkington's lands were confiscated. The remains, once buried, have been excavated for public display and now form the centrepiece of Castle Square in the town centre.
Dunham Castle	Dunham Massey; SJ73428742	Motte	Pre-1173	No	The castle was first recorded in 1173 and belonged to Hamon de Massey. It was still standing in 1323 and fell into disuse sometime between then and 1362. The castle is 24 metres (79 ft) in diameter and survives to a height of 2 metres (6.6 ft). The site is surrounded by a moat that has been turned into an ornamental lake. It was formerly protected as a scheduled monument, but was delisted as it may be a "natural hummock of glacial sand".
Manchester Castle	Manchester; SJ839989	Fortified manor house	Pre-1184	No	The castle is thought to have stood on a bluff at the confluence of the rivers Irk and Irwell, near Manchester Cathedral and beneath the present-day Chetham's School of Music, placing it on the edge of medieval Manchester. It may originally have been a ringwork castle before later becoming a manor house. First recorded in 1184, it was held in 1215 by Gresle, the baron of Manchester, and in 1243 by Robert de Furch. Three concentric rings of ditches have been identified around the likely site of the castle.
Radcliffe Tower	Radcliffe; SD79580751	Fortified manor house	1403	Yes	The tower is located on Church Street East and is all that remains of a medieval fortified manor house, built in 1403 and constructed from stone with two towers and a moat. The house was demolished in the 19th century, leaving only this tower, now a Grade I listed building and a scheduled monument. It measures 9.6 metres (31 ft) by 17 metres (56 ft) and survives to a height of 6.1 metres (20 ft). The structure was used as a pigsty before being restored.
Rochdale Castle	Rochdale; SD89121286	Motte-and-bailey	Early post Norman Conquest	No	The castle is defended by a ditch and an earth rampart; the motte measures 30 metres (100 ft) at the base, and the bailey is 37 metres (121 ft) by 30 metres (100 ft). It lay derelict by the early 13th century. Both the motte and bailey are now obscured by housing developments.
Stockport Castle	Stockport; SJ897905	Motte-and-bailey	Pre-1173	No	The castle stood on the south side of a valley overlooking a ford across the River Mersey. It was first recorded in 1173 when Geoffrey de Constentyn held it against Henry II during the barons' rebellion. Originally constructed with timber and earthwork defences, it was rebuilt in stone at the start of the 13th century. The castle lay in ruins by 1535 and was demolished in 1775 to make way for a cotton mill. Although no trace of the keep on the motte survives, it was described in 1775 as irregular in shape and measuring 31 by 60 metres (102 by 197 ft). The bailey lies to the south-east of the motte.
Ullerwood Castle	Ringway; SJ8083	Shell keep	Pre-1173	No	The castle has been confused with Watch Hill Castle in nearby Bowdon; both probably belonged to Hamon de Massey. It was first recorded in 1173 as one of the castles de Massey held against Henry II. The site is now topped by a modern house.
Watch Hill Castle	Bowdon; SJ74788599	Motte-and-bailey	12th century (probable)	Yes	The castle is located on the boundary of Bowdon and Dunham Massey. It was constructed from timber, with a motte 6 metres (20 ft) high, 40 metres (130 ft) wide at the base, and 17 metres (56 ft) across at the top; the bailey covers approximately 2,400 square metres (0.59 acres). A coin from the reign of Henry II was discovered at the site, and the castle may have been built during this period. It most likely belonged to Hamon de Massey. If it was built in Henry II's reign, it may have been used in the barons' rebellion against him. The castle had fallen out of use by the 13th century.

== See also ==
- Castles in South Yorkshire
- Castlesteads, Greater Manchester
- List of castles in Cheshire
- List of castles in England
- Scheduled monuments in Greater Manchester
