= List of places of interest in Greater Manchester =

This is a list of places of interest in the British county of Greater Manchester. See List of places in Greater Manchester for a list of settlements in Greater Manchester.

== Bolton ==
Name	Image	Location	Description
Bolton Museum		Bolton	Museum and art gallery including collections of natural history, archaeology, art and local history, as well as one of Britain's oldest public aquariums.
Bolton Steam Museum		Bolton	Museum housing a variety of preserved steam engines.
Hall i' th' Wood		Bolton	16th century manor house that was the home of Samuel Crompton and was where he designed and built the first spinning mule. Grade I listed building.

== Bury ==
Name	Image	Location	Description
Bury Art Museum		Bury	Museum and art gallery that is home to the Wrigley Collection, an assemblage of over two hundred oil paintings, watercolours, prints and ceramics accumulated by the Victorian paper manufacturer Thomas Wrigley.
Fusilier Museum		Bury	Museum housing the collection of the Lancashire Regiment, commemorating over three hundred years of the regiment's history.
Radcliffe Tower		Radcliffe	Remains of a fortified manor house built in 1403 by James de Radcliffe. Grade I listed building.

== Manchester ==
Name	Image	Location	Description
84 Plymouth Grove		Manchester	Neoclassical villa and former home of the Gaskell family built c.1838. Its neoclassical style is rare in Manchester. Grade II* listed building.
Centre for Chinese Contemporary Art		Manchester	Agency for Chinese art established in 1986.
Gallery of Costume		Fallowfield	Museum housing clothing and accessories from the 17th century to the present.
Heaton Hall		Heaton Park	Palladian country house described as one of the finest buildings of its kind in Lancashire. Grade I listed building.
Heaton Park BT Tower		Heaton Park	Telecommunication tower that is one of the few British towers built of reinforced concrete.
Heaton Park Tramway		Heaton Park	
Holy Trinity Platt Church		Rusholme	Anglican church built in 1845 by Edmund Sharpe as his second 'pot church', so-called because the main building material used in its construction was terracotta. Grade II* listed building.
John Rylands Library		Deansgate	
Manchester Art Gallery		Manchester	
Manchester Jewish Museum		Manchester	Museum located in a former Spanish and Portuguese synagogue. Grade II* listed building.
Platt Fields Park		Fallowfield	Large public park with an artificial pleasure lake.

== Oldham ==
Name	Image	Location	Description
Gallery Oldham		Oldham	Art gallery and natural history museum.

== Rochdale ==
Name	Image	Location	Description
Ellenroad Mill		Newhey	Former cotton spinning mill, part of which now forms the Ellenroad Ring Mill Engine, a preserved stationary steam engine.

== Salford ==
Name	Image	Location	Description
The Lowry		Salford Quays	

== Stockport ==
Name	Image	Location	Description
Bramall Hall		Bramhall	14th century Tudor manor house that is the ancestral home of the Davenport family. Grade I listed building.
Hat Works		Stockport	Museum located in Wellington Mill, an early fireproof cotton spinning mill. Grade II listed building.

== Tameside ==
Name	Image	Location	Description
Buckton Castle		Stalybridge	Medieval ringwork remains of a castle with a curtain wall built by William de Neville in the late 12th century.

== Trafford ==
Name	Image	Location	Description
Dunham Massey Hall		Dunham Massey	Moated hall built in 1616 by Sir George Booth. Grade I listed building.
Imperial War Museum North		Trafford Park	

== Wigan ==
Name	Image	Location	Description
Astley Green Colliery Museum		Astley	Former working colliery that produced coal from 1912 to 1970. It is now a museum and has the only surviving pit headgear and engine house on the Lancashire Coalfield. Grade II listed building.
Haigh Hall		Haigh	Country house built in 1827-40 by James Lindsay, 24th Earl of Crawford, it remaining the seat of the Lindsay family until 1947. Grade II* listed building.
Haigh Windmill		Haigh	Tower mill built in 1845. It is the only remaining windmill in Greater Manchester.
