= Agden =

Agden may refer to:

- Agden, Cheshire West and Chester, England
- Agden, Cheshire East, England
- Agden Reservoir, Sheffield, England
