= Dunham Town =

Coordinates: 53.388°N 2.390°W

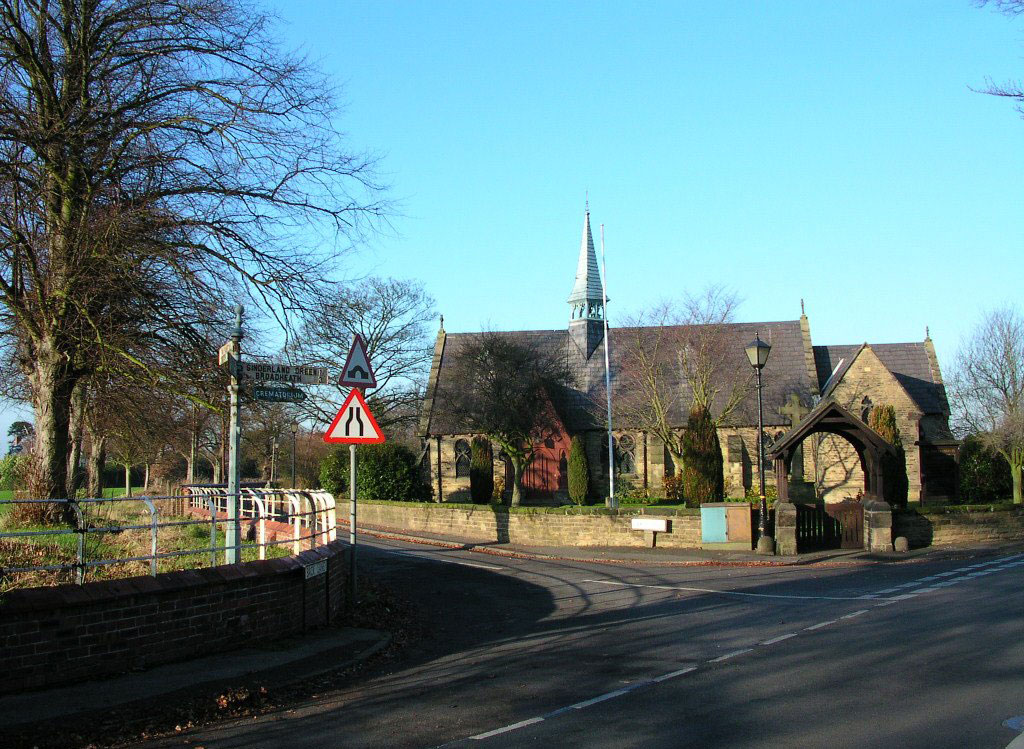
- St Mark's Church, Dunham Town

- Location within Greater Manchester
- OS grid reference: SJ740880
- Civil parish: Dunham Massey
- Metropolitan borough: Trafford
- Metropolitan county: Greater Manchester
- Region: North West
- Country: England
- Sovereign state: United Kingdom
- Post town: ALTRINCHAM
- Postcode district: WA14
- Dialling code: 0161
- Police: Greater Manchester
- Fire: Greater Manchester
- Ambulance: North West
- UK Parliament: Altrincham and Sale West

Dunham Town (often simply called Dunham) is a village in the civil parish of Dunham Massey in the Metropolitan Borough of Trafford, Greater Manchester, England. It was historically a part of Cheshire.

== History ==
Dunham Town previously formed part of the parish of Bowdon, in the hundred of Bucklow.

== Geography ==
Dunham Town is in the Bowdon ward of the Metropolitan Borough of Trafford.

Neighbouring settlements include Altrincham, Bowdon, Dunham Woodhouses, Little Bollington and Partington.

Dunham Park lies to the south of the village. It was designated a site of special scientific interest in 1965 because of its biological content. Dunham Park has been managed by the National Trust since 1976.

== See also ==
- Listed buildings in Dunham Massey
