= Ullerwood Castle =

Castle in Greater Manchester, England

- Ringway, Greater Manchester, England

Site information
- Type: Motte-and-bailey castle
- Owner: Hamon de Masci
- Condition: Destroyed; site built over

Location
- Location in Greater Manchester
- Coordinates: 53.3504°N 2.3005°W

Site history
- Built: 11th–12th century (probable)

Ullerwood Castle is an early medieval castle, possibly a shell keep, in Ringway, a civil parish on the southern border of Manchester, England. Twelfth-century historian Roger of Hodwen included Hamon de Masci in list of rebels against Henry II in 1173 and wrote that he held the castles of Ullerwood Dunham. There is no other contemporary documented reference to the site. Ullerwood Castle has been confused with Watch Hill Castle in nearby Bowdon, but the two are separate sites, though both were probably owned by the de Masci family. The castle site lies beneath a house and is surrounded by trees.

== See also ==
- List of castles in Greater Manchester
