= Ringway, Manchester =

Civil parish in Greater Manchester, England

Coordinates: 53.357°N 2.272°W

Ringway
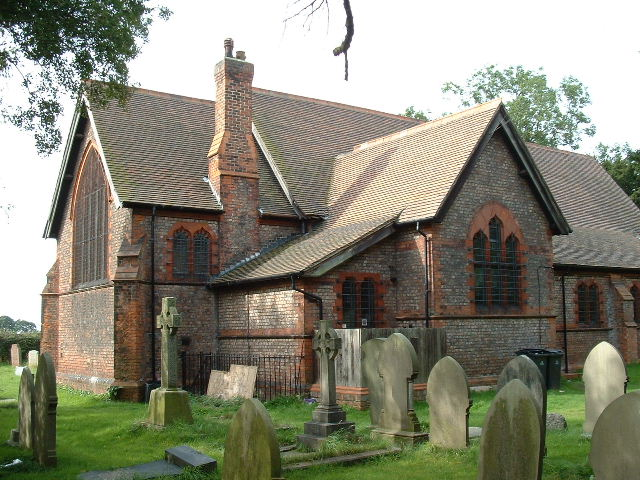
- Ringway Chapel

- Location within Greater Manchester
- Interactive map of Ringway
- Population: 103 (2011 Census)
  - Density: 0.2
- OS grid reference: SJ818845
- Civil parish: Ringway
- Metropolitan borough: Manchester
- Metropolitan county: Greater Manchester
- Region: North West
- Country: England
- Sovereign state: United Kingdom
- Post town: ALTRINCHAM
- Postcode district: WA15
- Post town: MANCHESTER
- Postcode district: M90
- Dialling code: 0161
- Police: Greater Manchester
- Fire: Greater Manchester
- Ambulance: North West
- UK Parliament: Wythenshawe and Sale East

Ringway is a civil parish on the southern border of Manchester, England. Historically in Cheshire, it is the only civil parish in the city of Manchester. The population at the 2011 census was 103. Ringway is home to Manchester Airport.

== History ==
The name appears to come from the Old English (Anglo-Saxon) Hringhæg meaning "circular or enclosing hedged enclosure".

Ringway Chapel is on Wilmslow Old Road near the south edge of Manchester Airport.

- 1173: First mention of Ullerwood Castle, which is now in Ringway parish. It is a shell keep; at that time it was owned by Hamon de Massey.
- 1515: First mention of 'Ringey Chapel', a chapel of ease in Bowdon parish.
- English Civil War (1642–1651): Dissenters started using the Ringway Chapel.
- 1721 or shortly before: John Crewe of Crewe Hall inherited the Lordship of Ringway.
- 1721 Dissenters were ejected from the chapel, and moved to a barn, and in 1723 re-established themselves at Hale.
- About 1736: Ringway Chapel was demolished, and replaced by a new plain red brick building. According to the St Wilfrid's Mobberley Christening Records Abraham Johnson was baptised on 24 October 1736 "the first Sunday after it was finished by me, Faithful Meaykin (curate of St Wilfrid's) who preached the first sermon"
- 1741: The chapel's bell was recast or replaced.
- 1751: Record of baptisms began.
- 1821: Record of burials began: previous burials were at Bowdon.
- 1863: Ringway parish (including all or part of what is now Halebarns) was split off Bowdon parish. Ringway chapel became Ringway parish's parish church dedicated to All Saints.
- 1894: Ringway church was demolished and rebuilt.
- 20 April 1895: Ringway church was consecrated by the Bishop of Chester.
- November 1967: A new parish church (dedicated to All Saints) was consecrated in Ringway Parish's Halebarns end, because urban spread from Altrincham into Halebarns, and loss of farms near Ringway due to road and airport extensions, had changed the centre of gravity of the parish.
- December 1970: Ringway Church declared redundant by an Order in Council and closed. It became a storeroom.
- 1974: Part of Ringway ecclesiastical parish was brought into the city of Manchester as Ringway civil parish, to bring most of the terminal and hangar areas of Manchester Airport (previously known as Manchester (Ringway) Airport, built during 1935/38, and the location between 1940 and 1957 of RAF Ringway) within the city boundaries. The parish had previously been in the Bucklow Rural District of Cheshire.
- 1997: Ringway Chapel was restored and converted for use as a design studio.
- 2001: According to a census Ringway civil parish had a population of 106.
- 2011: Ringway chapel started to be used by the Seventh-day Adventist Church.

== Governance ==
Ringway Parish Council had nominally consisted of eight Councillors, but none had been elected and the parish council was not performing its statutory obligations. In a 2009 review of local governance arrangements in Manchester 35 (40%) of the 88 electors in the parish (100% of respondents) indicated the desire to retain the parish council. From 2010 the number of parish Councillors has been reduced to five, and the elections scheduled for 2011 were brought forward. Of the five Councillors nominally in the role since 2011, only four have lived in the parish. A further review of local arrangements is planned by Manchester City Council. The area is within the Manchester City Council Ward of Woodhouse Park (Wythenshawe); so does have effective representation from the three Ward (City) Councillors.

== Demography ==
At the 2001 UK census, Ringway civil parish had a total population of 106, of which 50 were female and 56 male. The average household size was 2.59. Of those aged 16–74 in Ringway, 38 (= 43.7%) had no academic qualifications, significantly higher than the 28.9% for all of England. According to the census, none were unemployed and 28 were economically inactive. Of the residents of Ringway parish, 16 were under the age of 16 and 3 were aged 75 and over; the mean age of the people of Ringway was 37.47. 84 of them described their health as 'good'.
