= Little Bollington =

Village in Cheshire, England

Coordinates: 53.376°N 2.409°W

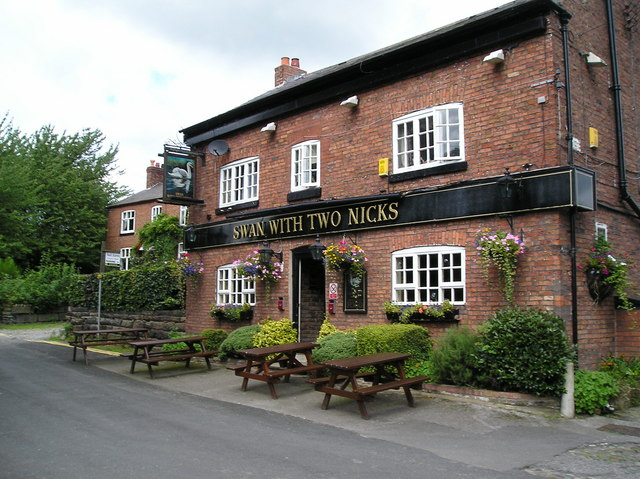
- The Swan With Two Nicks public house, Little Bollington

- Location within Cheshire
- Population: 170 (2011 census)
- OS grid reference: SJ728867
- Civil parish: Little Bollington with Agden
- Unitary authority: Cheshire East
- Ceremonial county: Cheshire
- Region: North West
- Country: England
- Sovereign state: United Kingdom
- Post town: ALTRINCHAM
- Postcode district: WA14
- Dialling code: 0161
- Police: Cheshire
- Fire: Cheshire
- Ambulance: North West
- UK Parliament: Tatton

Little Bollington is a village and former civil parish, now in the parish of Little Bollington with Agden, in the Cheshire East district, in the ceremonial county of Cheshire, England. The Bridgewater Canal runs through the western side and Dunham Park lies to the north east. The village is 2.5 miles (4.0 km) west of Altrincham, near the boundary with Greater Manchester, which here follows the River Bollin.

At the 2011 census the parish has a population of 170. In place of a parish council, administration took place via a parish meeting.

== History ==
At Fairy Brow in Little Bollington, there is evidence of Bronze Age activity. An archaeological dig by South Trafford Archaeological Group in 1983 uncovered an oval Bronze Age burial pit. In the burial were (unurned) cremated remains of an adult male; the remains were radio carbon dated to 3435 (+/-35) bp. A tanged copper alloy knife dated 2000-1500 BC was with the cremated remains. According to the Domesday survey in 1086, the manor of Little Bollington was held by the Saxon thegn Aelfward and later by the Norman Hamon de Mascy. The northern part of Little Bollington was in the medieval parish of Bowdon.

Bollington was formerly a township in the parishes of Bowden and Rostherne, in 1866 Bollington became a civil parish, On 1 April 1974 the parish was renamed from "Bollington" to "Little Bollington", on 1 April 2023 the parish was abolished and merged with Agden to form "Little Bollington with Agden".

The area was flooded overnight on New Year’s Eve 2024 when the Bridgewater Canal was breached following heavy rain.

== Demography ==
At the 2001 census, Little Bollington had a total population of 162. For every 100 females, there were 100 males. The average household size was 2.22. Of those aged 16–74 in Little Bollington, 48.0% had no academic qualifications or one GCSE, similar to the figures for all of the former Borough of Macclesfield (35.6%) and England (45.5%). According to the census, 0% were unemployed and 24.41% were economically inactive. 9.88% of the population were under the age of 16 and 11.73% were aged 75 and over; the mean age of the people of Little Bollington was 47.83. 64.81% of residents described their health as 'good'.

== See also ==
- Listed buildings in Little Bollington
