= Castles in South Yorkshire =

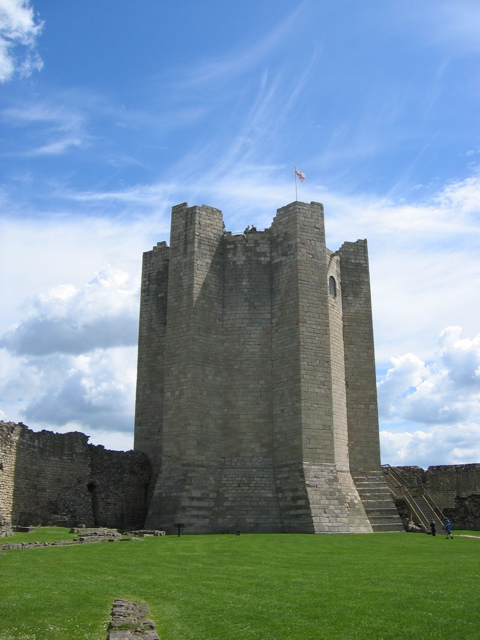
The keep of Conisbrough Castle in South Yorkshire

While there are many castles in South Yorkshire, the majority are manor houses and motte-and-bailey which were commonly found in England after the Norman Conquest.

== Mediaeval castles ==
=== Beighton ===
Beighton is now a suburb of Sheffield, but in the mediaeval period lay just over the county boundary in Derbyshire. Its castle is known only from a single thirteenth-century reference to "the tower of the former castle", and its location is not known with certainty. However, the Enclosure Plan for the village and a plan made in 1792 indicate a site by the River Rother, which may have formed a moat.

=== Bradfield ===
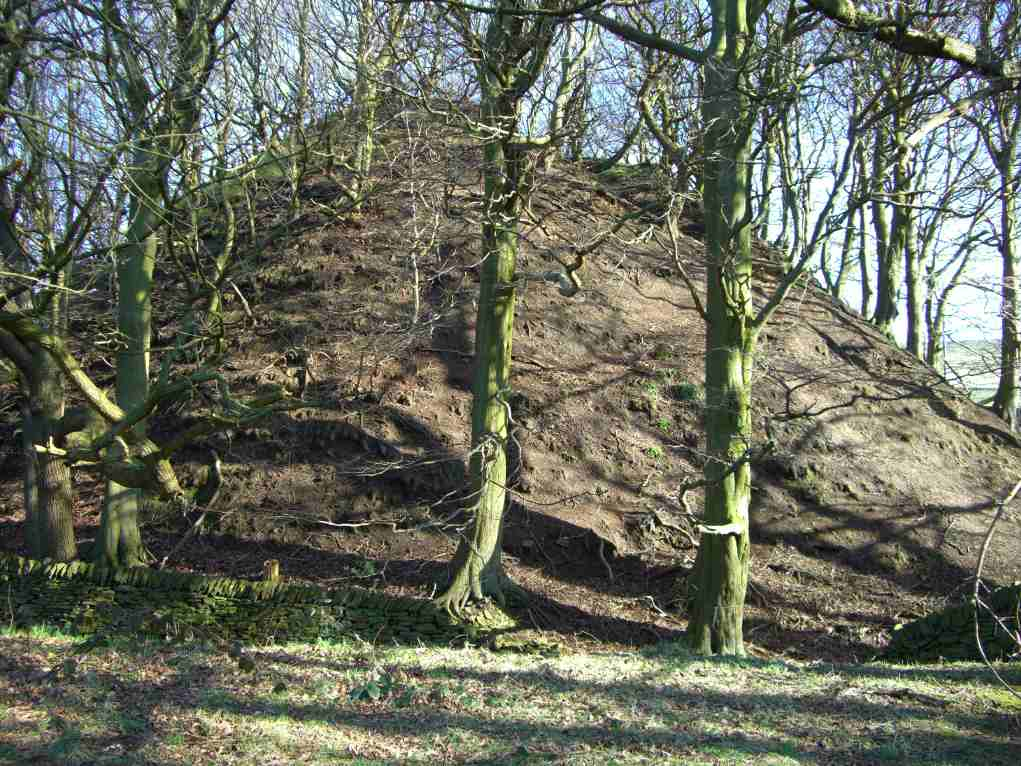
Bailey Hill in Bradfield in South Yorkshire

Bradfield lies north west of Sheffield. Two sites in the village have been identified with castles. Bailey Hill is a 60-foot-high (18 m) motte, and an eighteenth-century excavation found stonework, suggesting that its castle may have been rebuilt in stone. Its bailey covered three-quarters of an acre, and its surrounding ditch and rampart still stand up to 30 feet (9.1 m) high. The village grew up around this castle, which was dependent on Sheffield Castle. The site is a scheduled monument.

Nearby Castle Hill has been variously identified as a ringwork, a natural look-out point, or a siege work. The hill, which could possibly be a motte, has been quarried, although one source suggests remains of a keep were visible in 1819.

=== Conisbrough ===
Conisbrough Castle dates from the twelfth-century castle. Its remains are dominated by the 100 ft (30 m) high circular keep, which is supported by six buttresses. In the mid-1990s, the keep was restored, with a wooden roof and two floors being rebuilt. The building is considered one of South Yorkshire's primary tourist attractions, and sees in excess of 35,000 visitors per year.

=== Doncaster ===
Doncaster Castle lay on the site of the town's Roman fort, beside the River Don. It stood on a motte, which lies under the east end of St George's Minster. The motte was surrounded by a 16-foot (4.9 m) deep ditch, 30 feet (9.1 m) wide, which later marked the bounds of St George's churchyard. The castle was demolished, probably in the twelfth century, and there are no visible remains.

=== Hickleton ===
Hickleton lies west of Doncaster. Its castle was a motte and bailey, known from a seventeenth-century sketch of the motte made by Roger Dodsworth. The site was subsequently destroyed by quarrying, and no remains are visible.

=== Kimberworth ===
Kimberworth lies west of Rotherham. Its wooden castle was a motte and bailey, dependent on Tickhill Castle. The motte survives, but there is no visible evidence of the bailey, and the castle was never rebuilt in stone. The site is a scheduled monument.

=== Laughton ===
Laughton-en-le-Morthen lies south east of Rotherham. Laughton Castle was a motte and bailey dependent on Tickhill Castle, and was probably built on the site of a hall owned by Edwin, Earl of Mercia. The motte survives, as does a ditch surrounding the bailey. The castle was probably originally built by Roger de Busli, and may predate his castle at Tickhill. The site is a scheduled monument.

=== Langthwaite ===
Langthwaite lay north of Doncaster. The village is now abandoned, but the site of the castle lies near Adwick le Street. The castle was a motte and bailey. The motte survives, reduced in height, while a 40-foot (12 m) wide ditch marks the outline of the bailey. The site is a scheduled monument.

=== Mexborough ===
Mexborough lies north of Rotherham. Its wooden castle was a motte and bailey, dependent on Tickhill Castle. The motte and earthworks of the bailey survive in a public park (Castle Hills Park) and so are freely accessible during daylight hours. The castle was never rebuilt in stone. Although reduced in size, the motte stands 52 feet (16 m) high, and is surrounded by a six-foot bank and a 50 ft (15 m) wide ditch. The site is a scheduled monument.

=== Sheffield ===
The first Sheffield Castle was a wooden motte and bailey type, built for William de Lovetot in the early twelfth century. The first castle was destroyed during the Second Barons' War in 1266, along with the rest of the town, and was replaced by a larger stone castle in 1270. The castle was badly damaged in the English Civil War and largely demolished in 1648.

=== Skellow ===
Skellow lies north west of Doncaster. Its castle was a motte and bailey. The motte survives in the grounds of Skellow Hall, and part of the earthworks of the bailey can be seen in a field to the north. The site was reused during the English Civil War, and is now known as Cromwell's Batteries. The site is a scheduled monument.

=== Tickhill ===
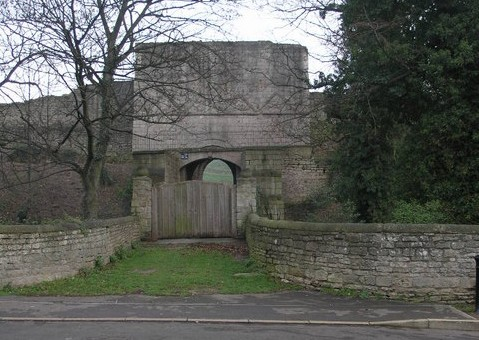
Part of Tickhill Castle

Tickhill Castle was a prominent stronghold in the reign of King John I of England.

=== Thorne ===
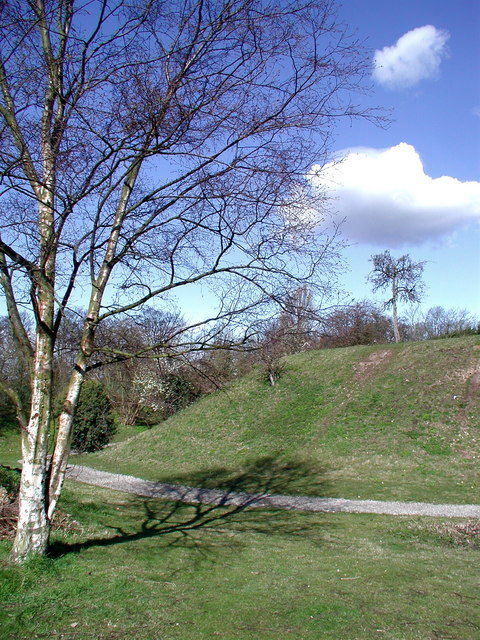
The motte of Thorne Castle

Thorne lies north east of Doncaster. Its castle was a motte and bailey dependent on Conisbrough. The motte survives, now known as Peel Hill. A ditch around the motte also survives, and a few wall fragments have been found. The castle may have also acted as a hunting lodge for Hatfield Chase. The tower, built of masonry, survived at least until the fifteenth century, when John Leland wrote that "by the church garth of Thorne is a praty pile or castelet, well diked, now used for a prison for offenders in the forestes". The foundations were largely removed in the 1820s. The site is now a scheduled monument.

=== Other sites ===
There is a Castle Hill in Hampole, but the site has been heavily ploughed, and no evidence of a castle survives. There was a fortified manor house at Bolsterstone ("Bolsterstone Castle") of which only remnants remain. Fenwick has a mediaeval moat, and this site has been identified as the possible location of a fortification noted in 1272. Darfield New Hall was the site of a tower house built around the fifteenth century, sometimes identified as a pele tower. Cusworth Park in Sprotborough has a "Castle Hill", sometimes identified as a motte, but this may be a landscape gardening feature.

== Manor Houses ==
=== Houndhill ===
Houndhill in Worsbrough, Barnsley. The house has two sides of mediaeval fortification walls remaining along with two of the original four turrets. The fortified manor house was defended by fifty men-at arms during the English Civil War. The house still remains in the hands of the Elmhirst family who owned it at the time of the civil war.

=== Manor Lodge ===
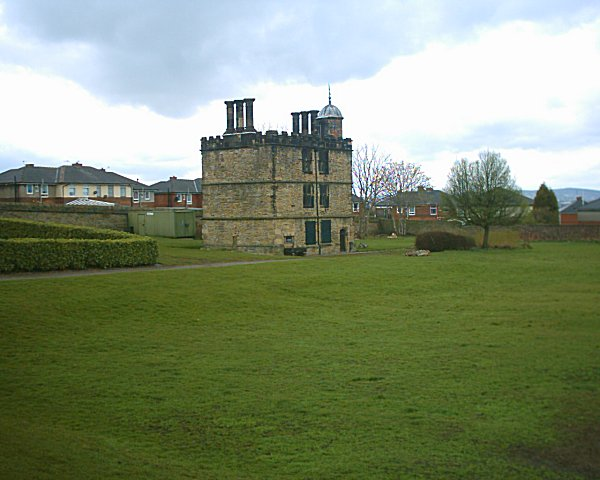
The Turret House at Manor Lodge

=== Other sites ===
Bentley has a double moat, with foundations of a building visible on the central platform. This may have been a mediaeval manor house. Rossington similarly has the Draw Dykes Moat, which was probably the site of a manor house, although there could conceivably have been a castle there. Hooton Pagnell Hall is a Tudor building, likely built on the site of a manor house. Cowley Manor in Ecclesfield was demolished in the seventeenth century, but is believed to have been a moated manor house.

== Post-Medieval structures ==
=== Stainborough Castle ===
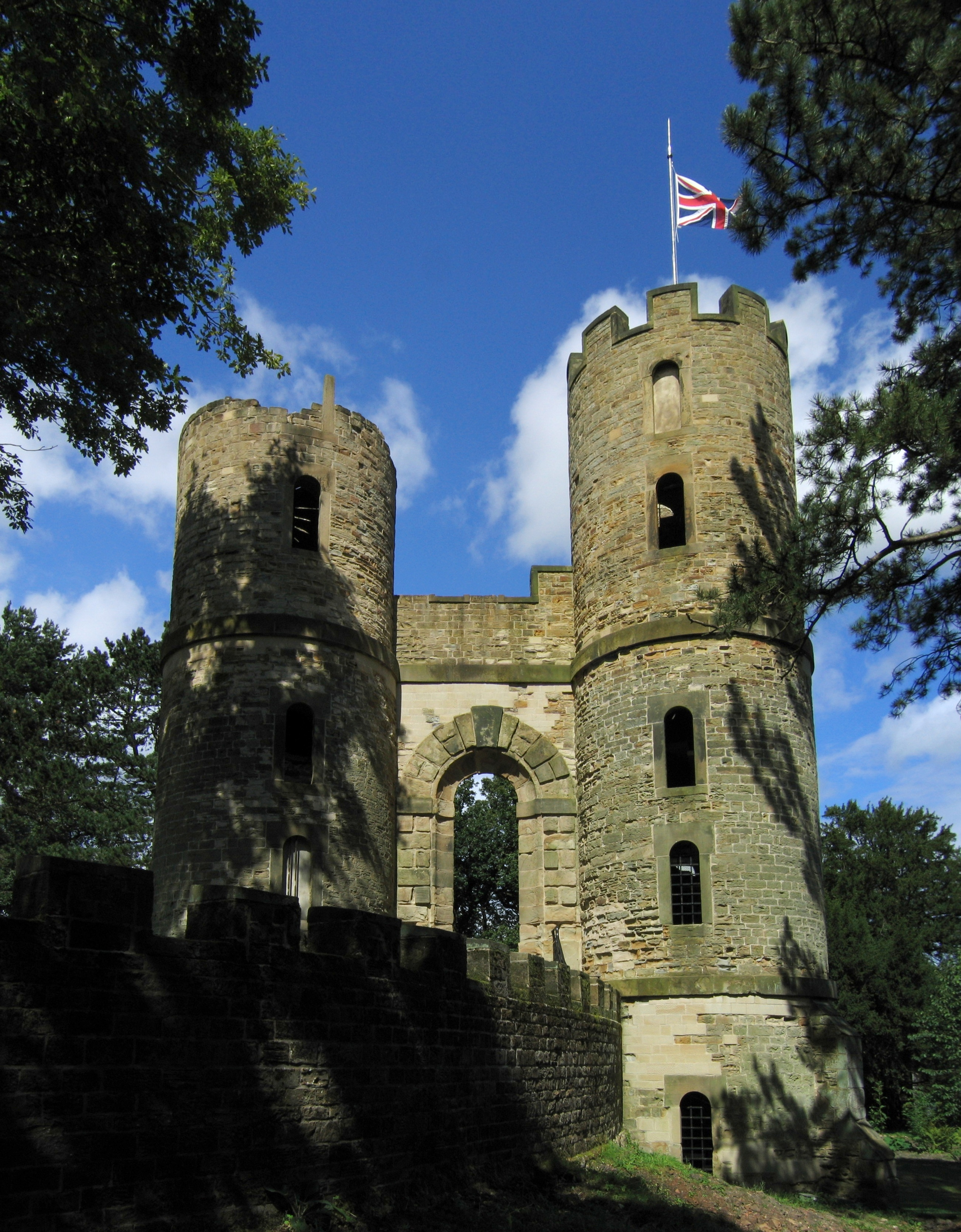
Stainborough Castle

Stainborough Castle, in the grounds of Wentworth Castle, is a folly built from 1726 and inscribed "Rebuilt in 1730". It missed by only a few years being the first sham castle in an English landscape garden.

=== Wentworth Castle ===
Wentworth Castle, near Barnsley, is a former stately home, the seat of the recreated Earls of Strafford.

== See also ==
- Castles in Greater Manchester
- Grade I listed buildings in South Yorkshire
