= Ernest Francis Bashford =

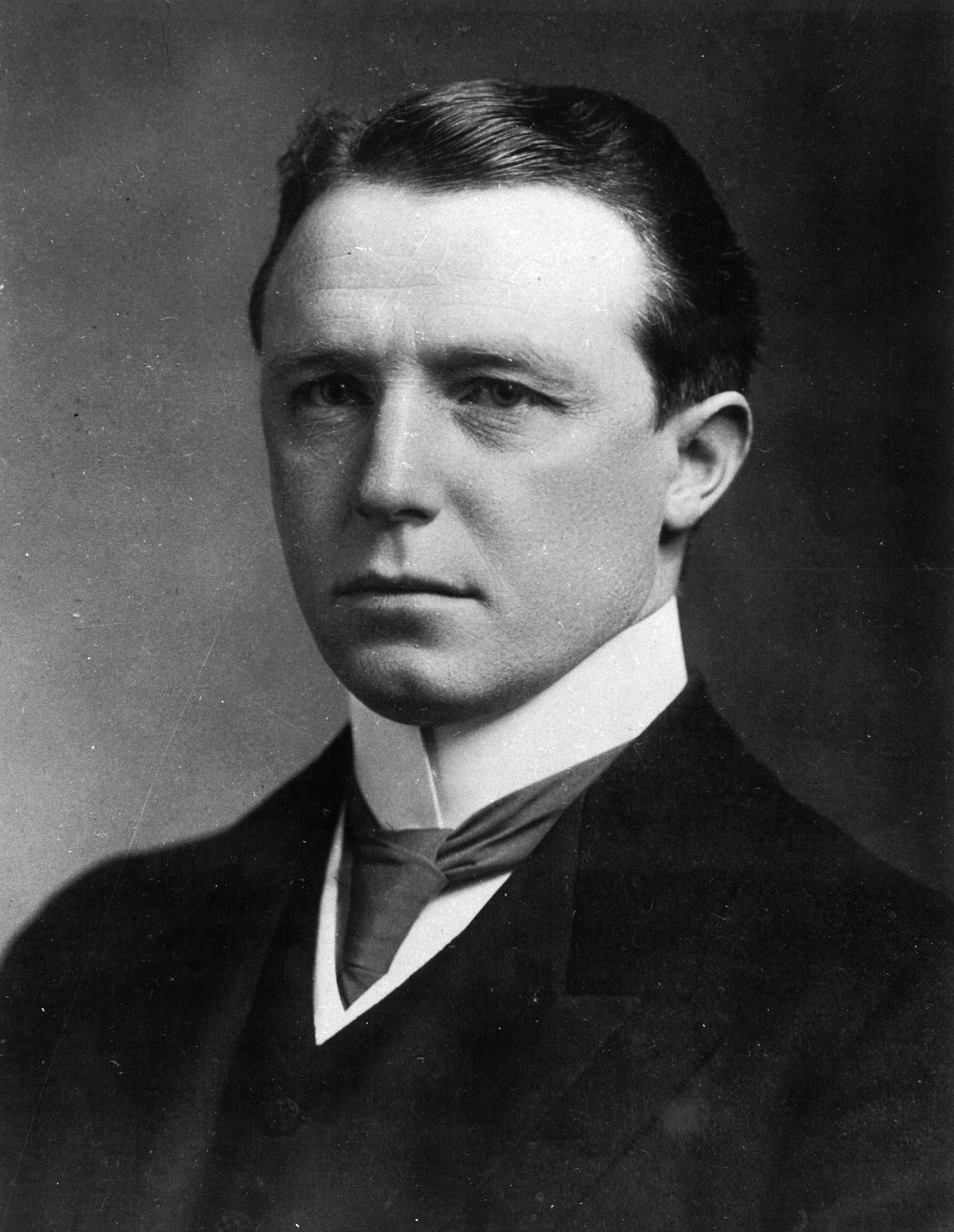
- Born: 1873; Bowdon, Cheshire, England
- Died: 23 August 1923 (aged 49–50); Germany
- Education: University of Edinburgh
- Known for: Oncology
- Scientific career
- Thesis: Some remarks on Ehrlich's chain theory of disease and immunity (1901)

Ernest Francis Bashford OBE (1873 – 23 August 1923) was an influential English oncologist who pioneered the biological approach to the study of cancer.

== Early life ==
Ernest Bashford was born in Bowdon, Cheshire, as the eldest son of William and Elizabeth Bashford. He attended George Heriot's School before studying at the University of Edinburgh. At Edinburgh he was Vans Dunlop Scholar in anatomy, chemistry, zoology and botany, Mackenzie Bursar in practical anatomy, and won the Wightman Prize in Clinical Medicine for his essay, "Some notes on cases treated in Ward XXVI of the Royal Infirmary during winter session 1896-97", the Patterson Prize in Clinical Surgery, was appointed to the Houldsworth research scholarship in experimental pharmacology and won the Stark scholarship in clinical medicine and pathology. He graduated with an MB ChB in 1899, followed by an MD in 1900.

== Career ==
Following graduation, he was awarded the McCosh graduate scholarship for study and research in Europe, an award which enabled him to travel to Germany, where he worked with Paul Ehrlich at the Royal Prussian Institute for Experimental Therapeutics, Frankfurt am Main, and then with Oscar Liebreich in the Pharmacological Institute in Berlin. In 1901 he won the Milner Fothergill Gold Medal in Therapeutics at the University of Edinburgh and returned there to work as an assistant to Thomas Richard Fraser, professor of clinical medicine.

In 1902 he married Elisabeth Alfermann, with whom he had a daughter, and also obtained his MD. That year he was appointed general superintendent of research at the Imperial Cancer Research Fund and in 1903 he became director of the Fund's laboratories in London. During this time, he established the modern practice of experimental investigation of cancer in Britain, asserting that it was a biological problem and not confined to human pathology. From articles in the British Medical Journal and other publications, he prepared a volume of reprints concerning the problems, growth and heredity of cancer, and experiments with breast cancer in mice. In this period he oversaw more than 200,000 experiments on animals to study their resistance to transplanted tumours. His criticism of the work of Dr Robert Bell, who believed that all cancers were caused by disorder of the blood and that surgery could not be an effective cure, resulted in a libel trial from which Bell was awarded damages of £2,000.

During the twelve years that he directed the laboratory, he established the Imperial Cancer Research Fund as an experimental research institution of international status. He was also president of the first International Cancer Congress in Heidelberg in 1906 and a delegate of the British government to the International Conference on Cancer Research in Paris in 1910.

== Later life ==
In 1914 he resigned from the Imperial Cancer Research Fund on the grounds of ill health, and was succeeded as director by J.A. Murray. From 1915 he served with the Royal Army Medical Corps, initially with the Mediterranean Expeditionary Force and then in France, where he held the post of adviser in pathology in the Army of Occupation. He was appointed OBE in 1919 and died from heart failure in Germany on 23 August 1923.
