= Listed buildings in Agden, Cheshire West and Chester =

Agden is a civil parish in Cheshire West and Chester, England. It contains four buildings that are recorded in the National Heritage List for England as designated listed buildings, all of which are at Grade II. This grade is the lowest of the three gradings given to listed buildings and is applied to "buildings of national importance and special interest". The parish is entirely rural, and all the listed buildings are related to agriculture.

Name and location	Photograph	Date	Notes
Fields Farm; 52.9943°N 2.7322°W	—	Early 17th century	Originating as a timber-framed farmhouse, it was partly encased in brick in the 19th century. It is in two wings, both with slate roofs, each having two storeys. The cross-wing is timber framed with brick nogging, standing on a brick and stone plinth. The right wing is encased in brick, and has two dormer windows.
Agden Hall Farmhouse; 52.9932°N 2.7302°W	—	Early 19th century	The farmhouse is constructed in brick with a slate roof, and is in two storeys. It has a gabled porch, and a doorcase with pilasters. The windows are casements. The gabled ends each have an open pediment. To the right of the house is a single-room extension.
Agden House Farmhouse; 52.9908°N 2.7306°W	—	Early 19th century	A farmhouse in brick with a slate roof. It is in three storeys. The style of the doorcase is derived from the Doric, and above the door is a fanlight. Flanking the doorway are two-storey bay windows with hipped roofs containing sash windows. There is another sash window in the top storey.
Stables and barn, Agden Hall Farm; 52.9935°N 2.7306°W	—	Early 19th century (probable)	Constructed in brick, these buildings are joined to form the north and west sides of the farmyard. They are in two storeys, and are roofed in corrugated asbestos. Features include divided doors, casement windows, breathers that are either loopholes or diamond-shaped, and pitch holes.

== See also ==
- Listed buildings in Dunham Massey
- Listed buildings in High Legh
- Listed buildings in Little Bollington
- Listed buildings in Lymm
- Listed buildings in Millington
