= Stockport Castle =

Former castle in Greater Manchester, England

- Location within Greater Manchester

General information
- Architectural style: Promontory castle
- Location: Stockport, Greater Manchester, England
- Coordinates: 53.411401°N 2.154218°W
- Demolished: 1775

Stockport Castle was a promontory castle in Stockport, Greater Manchester, England. Historically part of Cheshire, the castle stood within the medieval town, overlooking a ford across the River Mersey. It was first documented in 1173, but the next known reference dates to 1535, when it was already in ruins. The remaining structures were demolished in 1775.

== Location ==
Stockport Castle was an urban castle in the town of Stockport. The medieval town lay on the south side of a valley at the confluence of the rivers Goyt and Tame, where they form the River Mersey. The site of the castle is a 10-metre-high (33 ft) sandstone spur overlooking a ford (grid reference SJ897905). The castle was flanked by cliffs or steep slopes on its north, south, and west sides.

== History ==
The first mention of Stockport Castle comes from 1173, when Geoffrey de Costentyn held it against Henry II during the barons' rebellion of 1173–1174. There is a local tradition that de Costentyn was the son of Henry II, Geoffrey II of Brittany; in fact, de Costentyn was a local lord who owned not only the manor of Stockport but also land in Staffordshire and Ireland. The bailey would originally have been defended by a wooden palisade and earthworks; these were replaced by stone walls at the beginning of the 13th century. Two fragments of the wall survive.

Dent suggests that the castle began to decline in the 14th century when the Warren family became Lords of the Manor of Stockport; Stockport was not the only manor the family owned, and they favoured Poynton over Stockport. The castle's abandonment mirrors a wider trend among the castles of the Greater Manchester area; by the 13th century, apart from Dunham Castle, there was no indication of continued activity at any of them. According to the antiquarian John Leland, the castle lay in ruins by 1535. At this time, the gaol was still present and a market was held in the castle's bailey. The grounds had been divided and rented out by the Lord of the manor. The ruins were levelled in 1775 by Sir George Warren, the lord of the manor, and a cotton mill was built on the site. In 1974 excavations of the motte were carried out to establish how long the castle had been occupied.

== Layout ==
A motte-and-bailey castle was a common type of fortification in medieval England. It consisted of an artificial mound, usually surmounted by a tower or keep, with a large defended enclosed area next to the mound that was typically used for storage and barracks. Stockport Castle's motte occupied the site of what is now Castle Yard, previously known as Castle Hill, which influenced the name of the surrounding area. The bailey was situated south-east of the motte. The castle was probably similar in size and shape to sites such as Launceston in Cornwall and Pontefract in West Yorkshire. The keep surmounting the motte was irregularly shaped and, according to plans drawn in 1775 by the Reverend John Watson, a local antiquarian, measured 31 by 60 m (102 by 197 ft). No trace of the keep survives, as the area was levelled in 1775 and again in 1853.

== See also ==
- List of castles in Greater Manchester
