= Listed buildings in Little Bollington =

Little Bollington is a former civil parish in Cheshire East, England. It contained four buildings that are recorded in the National Heritage List for England as designated listed buildings, all of which are at Grade II. This grade is the lowest of the three gradings given to listed buildings and is applied to "buildings of national importance and special interest". Apart from the village of Little Bollington the parish was rural, and all the listed buildings are houses.

Name and location	Photograph	Date	Notes
The White Cottage; 53.37940°N 2.40926°W		16th century	A house that is basically timber-framed with four crucks. Some of it has been encased in brick and in sandstone. The roof is partly in slate and partly in asbestos. The house is in two storeys and has a two-bay front, with two large timber-framed dormers. Most of the windows are 20th-century casements.
Bollington Hall Farm House; 53.37909°N 2.40736°W		1770	A brick farmhouse on a rendered plinth and a slate roof. It is in two storeys and has a symmetrical three-bay front. The central bay projects slightly and has a recessed porch with a triple keystone. The windows are casements with voussoirs and keystones.
Stamford Farm House; 53.37550°N 2.40975°W	—	Late 18th century (probable)	A brick house with stone dressings and a slate roof. It is in two storeys with an attic, and has a symmetrical three-bay entrance front. The central bay projects slightly forward under a pediment. The doorway has a triple keystone and a gabled wooden canopy. The windows are 20th-century casements.
Holly Bank; 53.37575°N 2.41360°W	—	Early 19th century (probable)	A brick house with stone dressings and a slate roof. It is in two storeys with an attic, and has a symmetrical three-bay front. There is a central porch supported by Doric columns; it has an entablature and stands in front of a round-headed doorway. The windows are sashes.

== See also ==
- Listed buildings in Agden
- Listed buildings in Altrincham
- Listed buildings in Dunham Massey
- Listed buildings in Millington
- Listed buildings in Rostherne
