= Dunham Castle =

Medieval castle in Greater Manchester, England

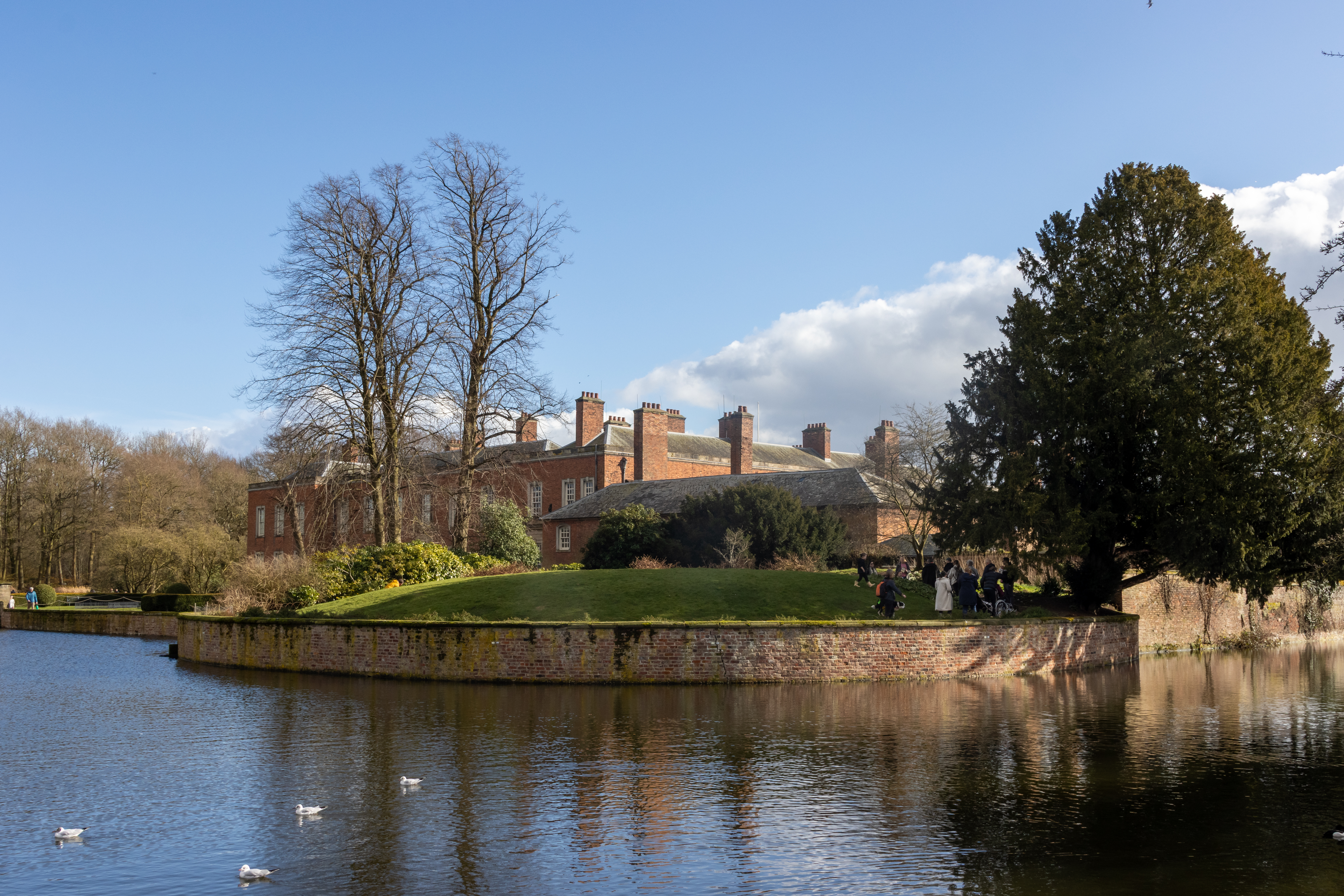
- The remaining mound at Dunham Massey Hall

- Location within Greater Manchester

General information
- Architectural style: Motte-and-bailey castle (probable)
- Location: Dunham Massey, Greater Manchester, England
- Coordinates: 53.38274°N 2.399571°W
- Completed: c. 1173
- Demolished: Between 1323 and 1362 (probable)
- Client: Hamo de Masci

Dunham Castle is an early medieval castle in Dunham Massey, a civil parish in the Metropolitan Borough of Trafford, Greater Manchester, England (grid reference SJ73428742).

== History ==
The castle is first referred to in 1173, in a document stating Hamo de Masci held the castles of Dunham and Ullerwood. Documentary evidence suggests that the castle at Dunham was still standing in 1323. It fell into disuse between 1323 and 1362. It probably stood on a mound, or motte, near the site of Dunham Massey Hall today. The motte is 24 metres (79 ft) in diameter and survives to a height of 2 metres (6.6 ft). The site was surrounded by a moat, which was later turned into an ornamental lake. Dunham Castle has been confused with Watch Hill Castle in nearby Bowdon, but the two were separate sites, though both were probably owned by the de Masci family. Dunham Castle was once a scheduled monument, but was delisted as it may be a "natural hummock of glacial sand".

== See also ==
- List of castles in Greater Manchester
- Scheduled monuments in Greater Manchester
