= Bury Castle, Greater Manchester =

Fortified manor ruins in Greater Manchester, England

Bury Castle
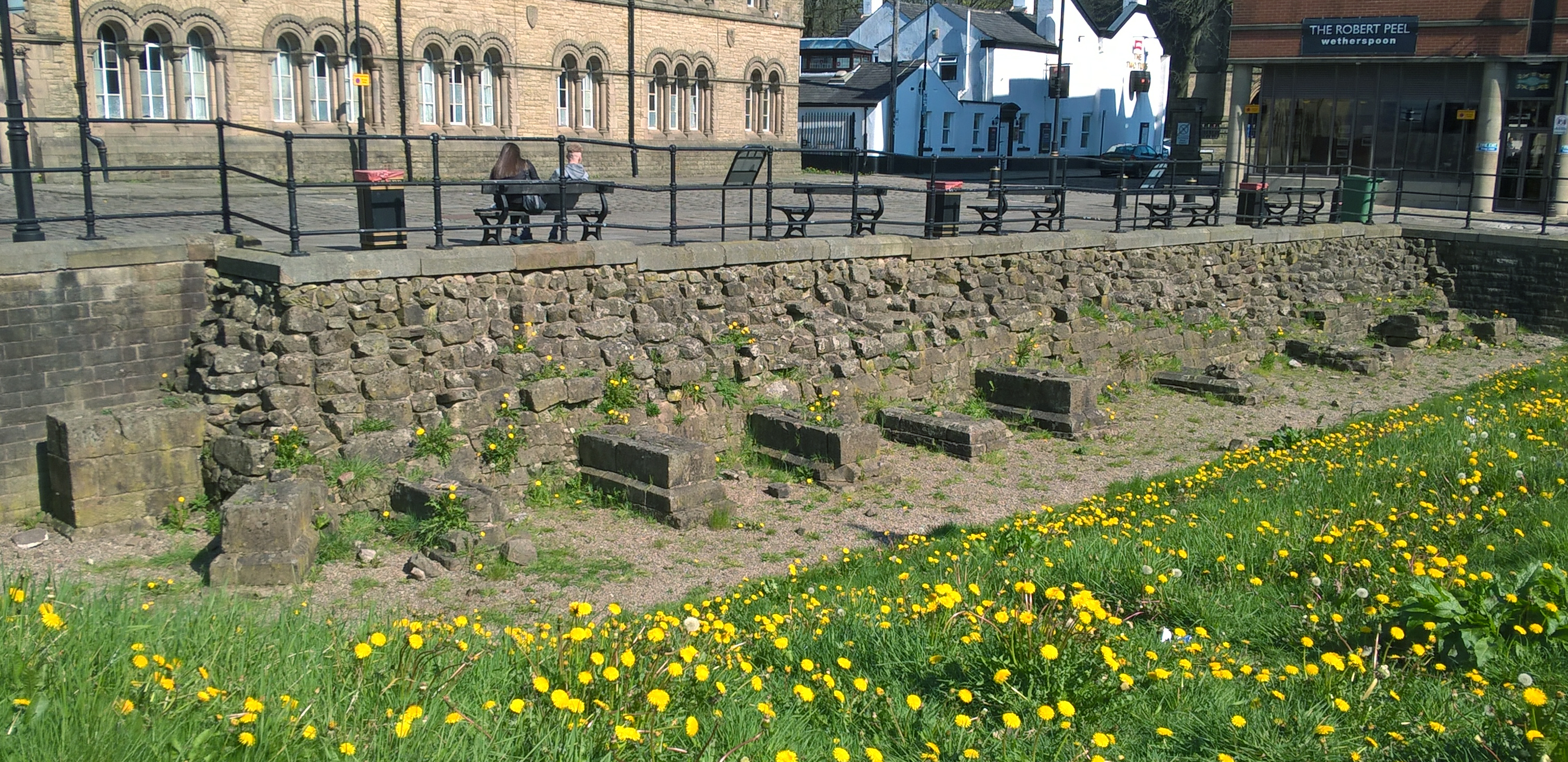
- Part of the inner wall of the moat of Bury Castle, with buttresses

- Location within Greater Manchester

General information
- Architectural style: Fortified manor house
- Location: Cooper Street, Bury, Greater Manchester, England
- Coordinates: 53°35′38″N 02°17′55″W
- Completed: 1469
- Demolished: 1485
- Client: Sir Thomas Pilkington

Design and construction
- Designations

Scheduled monument
- Official name: Medieval moated site and later fortified manor house known as Bury Castle 100m west of the parish church
- Designated: 27 January 1976
- Reference no.: 1015128

Bury Castle was an early medieval moated manor house in Bury, Greater Manchester, England. Historically part of Lancashire, its remains are listed as a scheduled monument. The manor house was built in 1469 by Sir Thomas Pilkington – lord of the manors of Bury and Pilkington, and an influential member of the Lancashire gentry. He was granted permission by Edward IV to:

"'build to make and to construct walls and turrets with stone, lime and sand around and below his manor house in Bury in the County of Lancaster, and to shut in the manor house with such manner of walls and turrets; also to embattle, crenellate and machicolate those towers."

It is situated at the top of a slope overlooking the River Irwell, in a strong defensive position. Excavations have revealed six main construction phases on the site. The first phase, dated between 1359 and 1400, produced a house platform surrounded by a moat. The building was razed to the ground (slighted) on the orders of Henry VII after Sir Thomas supported the House of York in the Wars of the Roses, particularly the Battle of Bosworth in 1485. In addition, all of Sir Thomas' lands were confiscated.

In 1540 the antiquary John Leland described Bury Castle as "a ruin of a castle by the Parish Church in the town". In 1753 Thomas Percival drew plans of the visible foundations of the castle walls, measuring 600 ft (180 m) by 270 ft (82 m). The ruins were subsequently looted to provide building material for the town of Bury. In 1865 further foundations were discovered, this time of a keep or defensive tower measuring 82 ft (25 m) by 63 ft (19 m), with walls 6 ft (1.8 m) thick.

The remains of Bury Castle drew public attention in 1973, when amateur archaeologists uncovered stonework that had previously lain beneath a car park. The site, which is owned by Bury Council and has undergone "restoration and enhancement work", has been open to the public since 2000 and now forms the centrepiece of Castle Square in the town centre. Bury Castle is about 3.3 km (2.1 mi) north of Radcliffe Tower, an early 15th-century moated manor house.

== See also ==
- List of castles in Greater Manchester
- Scheduled monuments in Greater Manchester
