= Dunham Massey =

Civil parish in Greater Manchester, England

Coordinates: 53.381°N 2.397°W

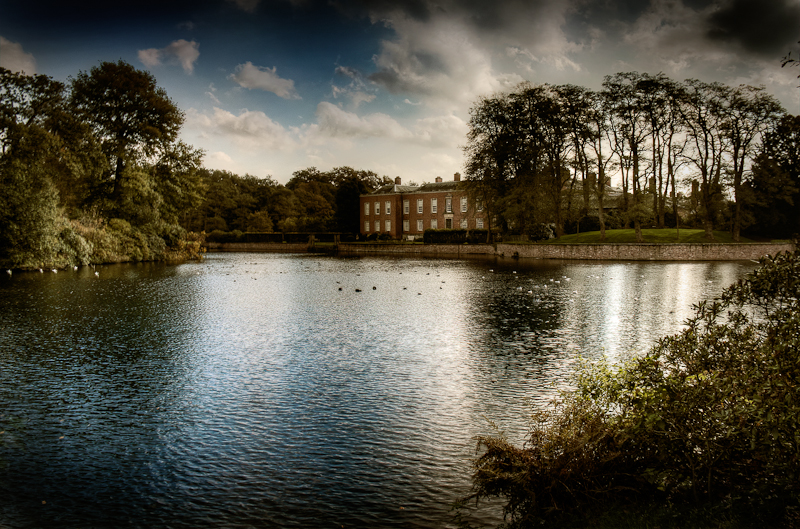
- Dunham Massey Hall

- Location within Greater Manchester
- Population: 475 (2001 Census)
- OS grid reference: SJ740876
  - London: 200 miles
- Metropolitan borough: Trafford
- Metropolitan county: Greater Manchester
- Region: North West
- Country: England
- Sovereign state: United Kingdom
- Post town: ALTRINCHAM
- Postcode district: WA14
- Dialling code: 0161
- Police: Greater Manchester
- Fire: Greater Manchester
- Ambulance: North West
- UK Parliament: Altrincham and Sale West

Dunham Massey is a civil parish in the Metropolitan Borough of Trafford, Greater Manchester, England. The parish includes the villages of Sinderland Green, Dunham Woodhouses and Dunham Town, along with Dunham Massey Hall and Park, formerly the home of the last Earl of Stamford and owned by the National Trust since 1976. Dunham Massey is in the historic county of Cheshire but, since 1974, it has been part of Trafford Metropolitan Borough; the nearest town is Altrincham. At the 2001 census, the parish had a population of 475.

Dunham Massey's history is reflected in its 45 listed buildings. It was a regionally important place during the medieval period and the seat of the Massey barons. The Georgian mansion, with the remains of a castle on its grounds, is a popular tourist attraction. There are two Sites of Special Scientific Interest in Dunham Massey: Dunham Park, located south of Dunham Town, and Brookheys Covert.

== History ==
The Roman road between Chester and York passing between the Dunham Massey and Bowdon forms the boundary between the two. The name Dunham is derived from the Anglo-Saxon dun, meaning hill. The Massey element of the name is a result of its ownership by the Massey family. The manor of Dunham is recorded in the Domesday Book of 1086 as having belonged to Aelfward, a Saxon thegn, before the Norman Conquest and to Hamo de Masci afterwards. The Barons de Masci also had control over the manors of Baguley, Bowdon, Hale, Partington and Timperley. The suffix of "Massey" to the name Dunham reflects the manor's importance; Dunham was the seat of the Masseys.

The importance of Dunham is further exemplified by the former existence of two de Massey castles: Dunham Castle and Watch Hill Castle on the border with Bowdon; a third, Ullerwood Castle, was near Hale. The Masseys remained lords of Dunham and its environs until the 14th century, when the family's male line became extinct. The Booth family inherited most of the Massey family land in 1409, with Dunham Massey remaining at the heart of the estate.

By the Elizabethan period, Dunham Massey Castle had been demolished. Probably during the medieval period, Dunham Massey Hall became the home of the manorial lord and a centre of power in the area. The hall was rebuilt in 1616, leaving no remains of the old medieval manor house. A mill at Dunham was documented in 1353, although its present structure dates to the 1860s. It lies on the River Bollin, opposite Little Bollington. The first record of Dunham's deer park was also in 1353. The settlement at Dunham Woodhouse (named after an outlying lodge on the estate) dates from the 15th century. During the medieval period, the primary source of employment was agriculture, mainly arable farming.

The Warrington and Stockport Railway was constructed through Dunham during 1853/54. Dunham Massey railway station served the area between 1854 and its closure in 1962. Dunham grew as a result, with the population increasing by 57.5% between 1851 and 1881. Otherwise, the Industrial Revolution had little effect on Dunham Massey and it remained a predominantly agricultural area.

The area was flooded overnight on New Year’s Eve 2024 when the Bridgewater Canal was breached following heavy rain.

== Dunham Massey Hall ==
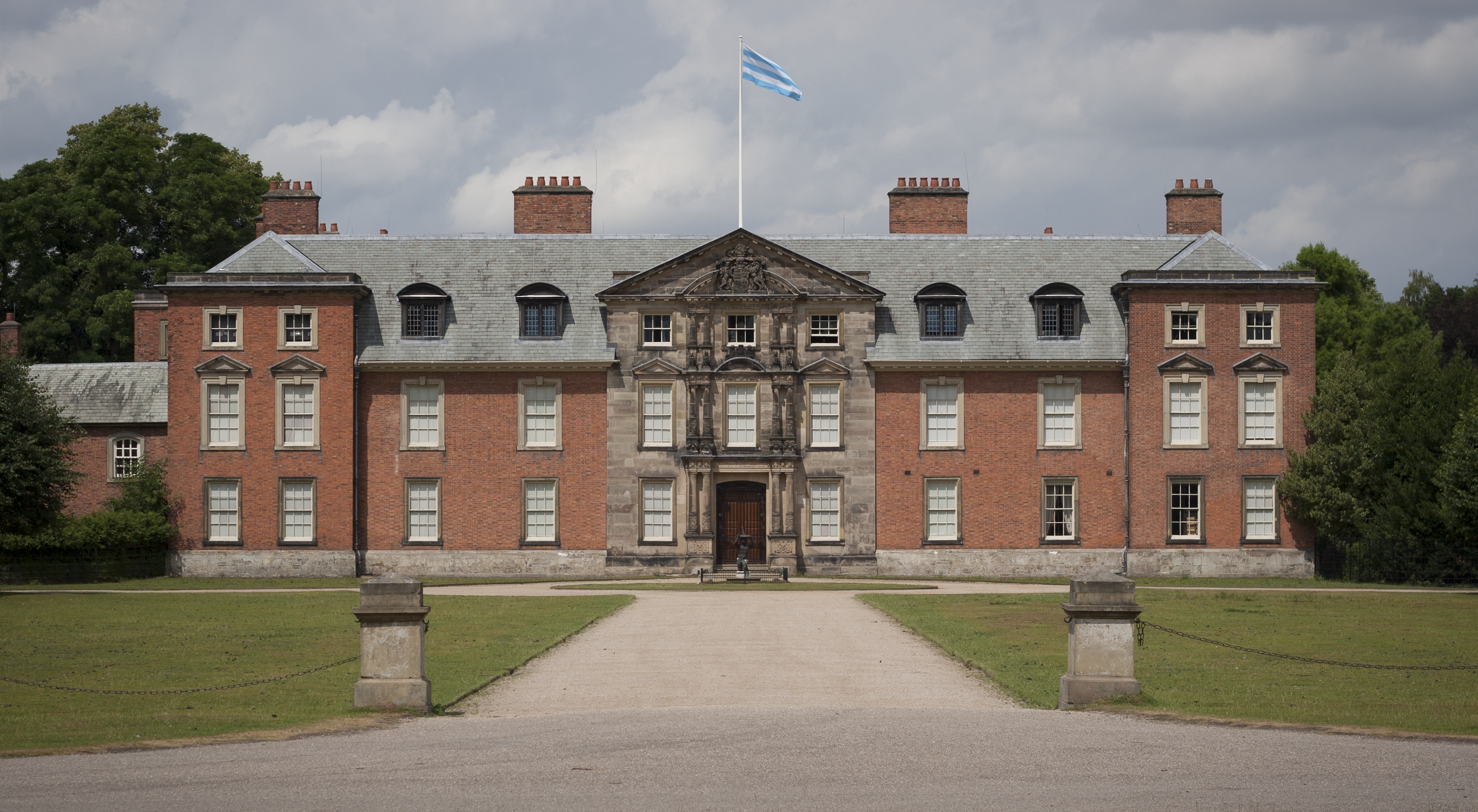
Dunham Massey Hall

The present hall was built in 1616 by Sir George Booth, who received one of the first baronetcies to be created by James I in 1611; it was remodelled by John Norris for his descendant, George, 2nd Earl of Warrington between 1732 and 1740. It was further altered by John Hope towards the end of the 18th century and again by Joseph Compton Hall between 1905 and 1908. The hall, stables and the carriage house of Dunham Massey are all Grade I listed buildings, three of six such buildings in Trafford.

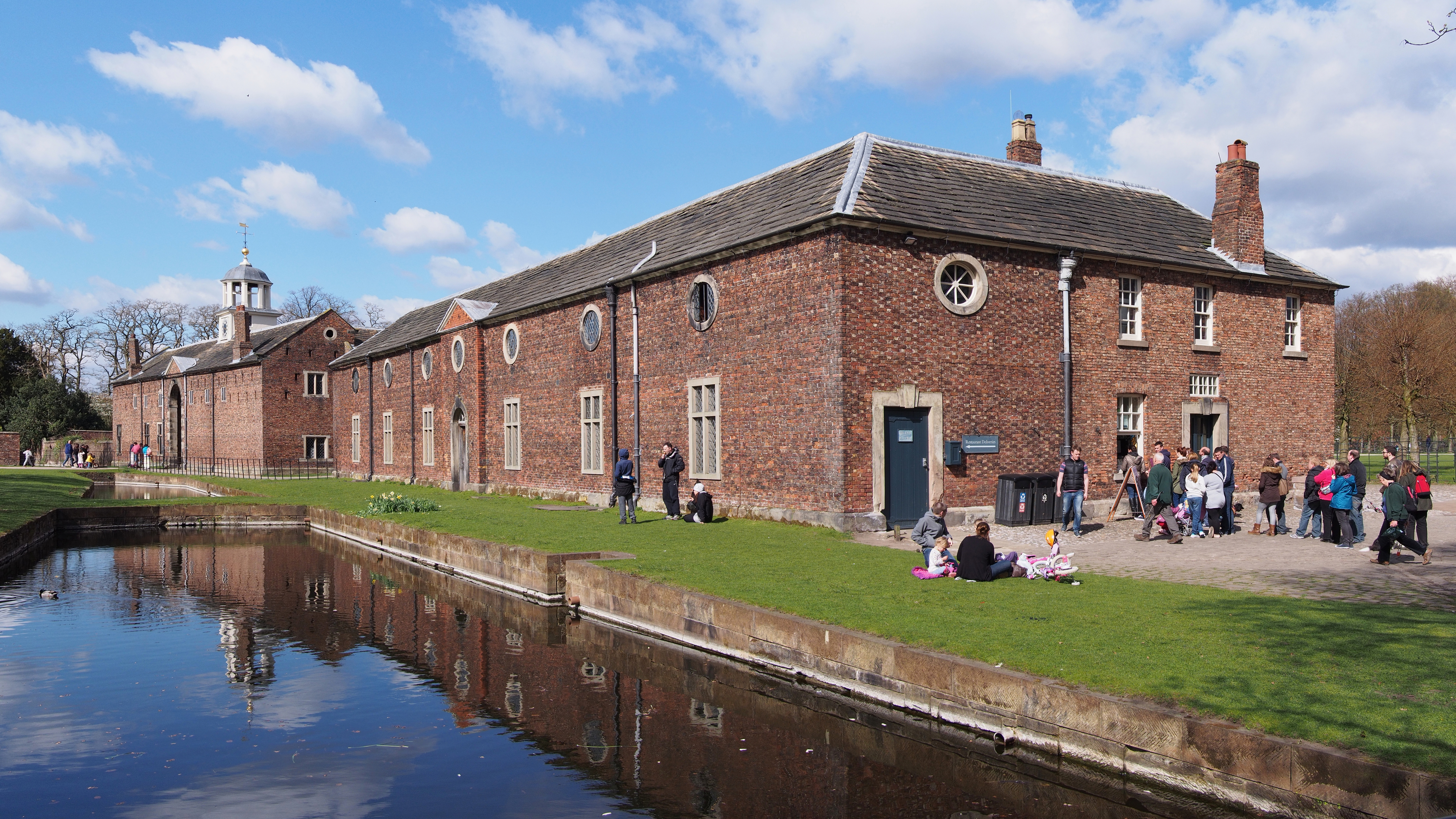
Dunham Massey stables and carriage hall

The site is moated and lies immediately west of the village of Dunham, with its deer park to the south. The hall was used as a military hospital during the First World War and donated to the National Trust by Roger Grey, 10th and last Earl of Stamford in 1976.

Inside is a significant collection of Huguenot silver, the carving The Crucifixion by 17th-century wood carver Grinling Gibbons and a white marble bust of the Emperor Hadrian. The head is antique, but the neck and shoulders are 18th-century; it was probably acquired by George, Earl of Stamford and Warrington. The hall's collection of paintings include Allegory with Venus, Mars, Cupid and Time by Guercino; The Cascade at Terni by Louis Ducros; and portraits by William Beechey, Francis Cotes, Michael Dahl, A. R. Mengs, Sir Joshua Reynolds, George Romney, Enoch Seeman and Zoffany. George Harry, Earl of Stamford and Warrington removed a selection of paintings to Enville Hall in the late-1850s and it was not until Roger Grey, 10th Earl of Stamford succeeded as Earl, that some were rebought by the family after sales in 1929 and 1931.

The deer park is the only surviving medieval park in Trafford or the surrounding area. The hall and grounds are open to the public and are a popular tourist attraction, with 310,093 visitors in 2018.

== Governance ==
Dunham Massey was historically in the ecclesiastical parish of Bowdon and the county of Cheshire.

The civil parish of Dunham Massey was created in 1894, under the Local Government Act 1894, and has its own parish council. Dunham Massey became part of the Metropolitan Borough of Trafford in 1974 upon the borough's creation, but was previously in Bucklow Rural District. The village is part of the Bowdon electoral ward. The Councillors for Bowdon Ward are Sean Anstee, Karen Barclay, and Michael Hyman, all members of the Conservative Party.

Dunham Massey is also a part of the Altrincham and Sale West constituency. Since the formation of the Altrincham and Sale West constituency in 1997, it has been represented in the House of Commons by the Conservative MP, Graham Brady.

== Geography ==
Dunham Massey lies to the east of Warburton and to the west of Bowdon, with Altrincham approximately 2 miles (3 km) to the north east. The landscape is predominantly flat, with some mossland. Dunham Park occupies 192.7 acres (78.0 ha) of the area. The Roman road running from Chester to York forms the boundary between Dunham and Bowdon. The River Bollin runs to the south, with the Bridgewater Canal running through the area. The local geology is lower keuper marl, with a ridge of sand and gravel running from Dunham to Warburton.

== Demography ==
At the 2001 UK census, Dunham Massey had a total population of 475. For every 100 females, there were 96.3 males. The average household size was 2.36. According to the census, 0.01% were unemployed and 19.24% were economically inactive. 17.89% of the population were under the age of 16, and 9.89% were aged 75 and over; the mean age of the residents of Dunham Massey was 43.71. 75.79% of residents described their health as 'good'.

Population size in Dunham Massey since 1861
Year	1861	1871	1881	1891	1901	1911	1921	1931	1951	1961	1971	2001
Population	1,535	1,790	1,977	2,079	2,644	2,928	1,668	1,694	523	525	539	475
Source: A Vision of Britain through Time

== Landmarks ==
=== Site of Special Scientific Interest ===
Brookheys Covert

Brookheys Covert is a Site of Special Scientific Interest in the Dunham Park Estate (grid reference SJ742904). The site is a semi-natural wood consisting mainly of ash, birch and rowan, with a wetland habitat and several marl pits, which have flooded to form ponds. The reserve spans 5.8 acres (2.3 ha) and is managed by the Dunham Massey Estates. Brookheys Covert provides a habitat for many animals, including foxes, rabbits, squirrels and 57 species of bird.

Dunham Park

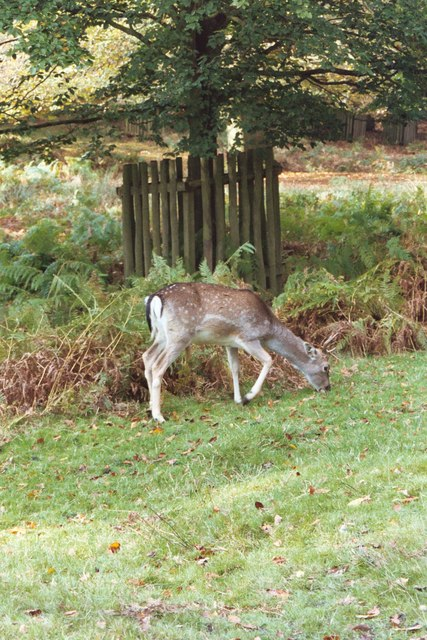
Dunham Massey Deer Park

Dunham Park covers an area of 192.7 acres (78.0 ha) and is part of the Dunham Park Estate, run by the National Trust (grid reference SJ740870). The park is mostly "pasture-woodland or park-woodland" and has been since the Middle Ages. Many of the oak trees, which make up the larger part of the woodland, date back to the 17th century. Dunham Park is the only place in the north-west of England with such a concentration of old trees and one of only a few remaining in England, making it a site of national importance. The park supports a range of animals, including fallow deer and over 500 species of insect.

=== Grades II* and II listed buildings ===
Dunham Massey has many Grade II listed buildings; among the most striking is the 18th-century sandstone obelisk at the end of the north vista from Dunham Massey Hall. Tradition has it that it marks the burial site of a racehorse.

There are many listed residences in Dunham Massey, most dating from the 18th or early 19th century, and many feature Flemish bond brickwork and slate roofs. They include: Dunham Massey Lodge, on Dunham Road; Willow Cottage; numbers 1 and 2 Barns Lane; number 1 Orchard View; The Hollies, on Station Road; numbers 1, 3 and 4 Woodhouse Lane; Big Tree Cottages, on Woodhouse Lane. Agden View, also on Woodhouse Lane, dates from 1725 and has both garden wall bond and Flemish bond brickwork. Big Tree House, on Charcoal Road, dates from the mid-18th century and features English bond brickwork.

Yew Tree Cottage and Lime Tree Cottage are also on Charcoal Lane; both houses date to the 17th century and exhibit garden wall bond brickwork with slate roofs. Ivy House, on Woodhouse Lane, was built in the early 18th century. Kitchen Garden cottage was built in 1702. Rose Cottage and Farm Cottage are late-18th or early 19th century. The Meadows, on School Lane, was built in the 17th century and features garden wall bond brickwork and a thatched roof.

The farm buildings of Home Farm, including its dovecote, were built in the early 19th century, and feature Flemish bond brickwork. Sinderland House, also dating from the early 19th century, is another of Dunham Massey's listed farmhouses. Manor Farmhouse, on Station Road, was built by George Booth, 2nd Earl of Warrington; the building dates from the mid-18th century and features both Flemish and garden wall bond brickwork. The farmhouse on Station Road was built in 1752. The barn on Woodhouse Lane dates from the early 18th century and features garden wall bond brickwork, a slate roof, and upper cruck frames. Dog Farmhouse, also on Woodhouse Lane, was built in the early 19th century; however, it may have been an adaptation of an earlier, possibly 18th-century, farmhouse.

Dunham School was built in 1759, with additions in 1860 and the 20th century. Above the door is an engraved panel reading: "This School was Erected in 1759 For the Benefit of the Township of Dunham Massey. According to the Will of Thomas Walton Gent." The school is now used as the parish hall. The nearby Dunham School Bridge, over the Bridgewater Canal, was built in 1776 by John Gilbert, who also built the aqueduct for the Bridgewater Canal over the River Bollin, which was opened in 1776. The other listed bridge, Brick Kiln Lane Bridge, was also built in the 18th century. Bollington watermill, constructed in the 1860s, has an undershot waterwheel.

There are a number of listed structures in the grounds of Dunham Massey Hall, including the 1720 wellhouse that supplied water to the hall until the 1860s, and the early-18th-century ornamental sundial in front of the hall, depicting a black slave clad in leaves, carrying the sundial above his head. The stable buildings, the slaughterhouse, the deer house, the orangery, and an ashlar shelter to the west of the hall, all date from the 17th or 18th century. Barn Cottages date from at least 1751.

The cottages were originally a single barn, which was converted in the 19th century. Other Grade II listed structures in the grounds of the hall include: the lakeside wall (18th century); two small piers south of the garden forecourt (18th-century); a pier north west of the garden forecourt (18th-century); the gateway opposite the kitchen (1750); the piers at the south of forecourt garden topped with lions (18th-century); and an obelisk erected by George, 2nd Earl of Warrington, in 1714 in memory of his mother. Near the hall there is a Grade II* listed sawmill, probably built in 1616.

== See also ==
- Grade I listed buildings in Greater Manchester
- Grade II* listed buildings in Greater Manchester
- Listed buildings in Dunham Massey
