= Manchester Castle =

Medieval fortified manor house in Manchester, England

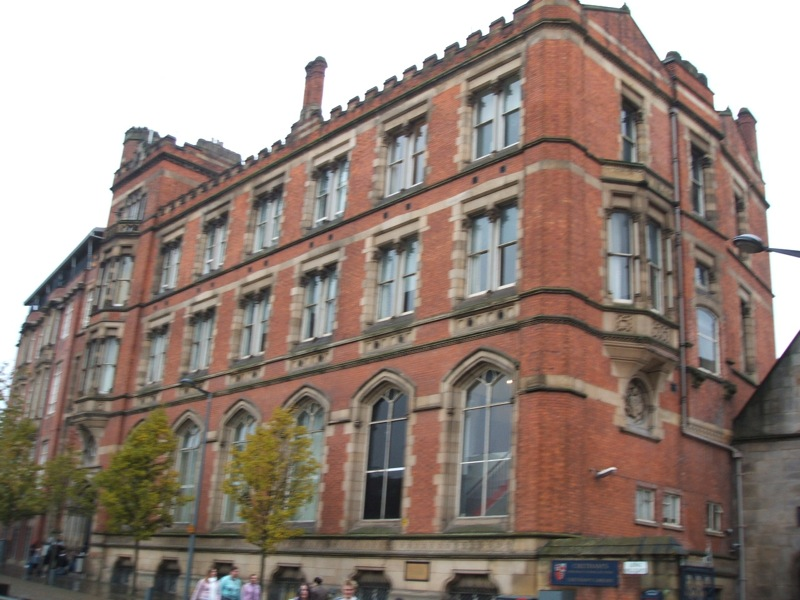
- Chetham's School of Music on the site of Manchester Castle

- Location within Greater Manchester

General information
- Architectural style: Fortified manor house
- Location: Manchester, England
- Coordinates: 53.486768°N 2.241911°W
- Client: de Grelley family barons of Manchester

Manchester Castle was a medieval fortified manor house in what is now Manchester city centre, England. It was probably located on a bluff at the confluence of the rivers Irk and Irwell, close to Manchester Cathedral, on the site now occupied by Chetham's School of Music, placing it near the edge of the medieval township of Manchester (grid reference SJ839989).

== History ==
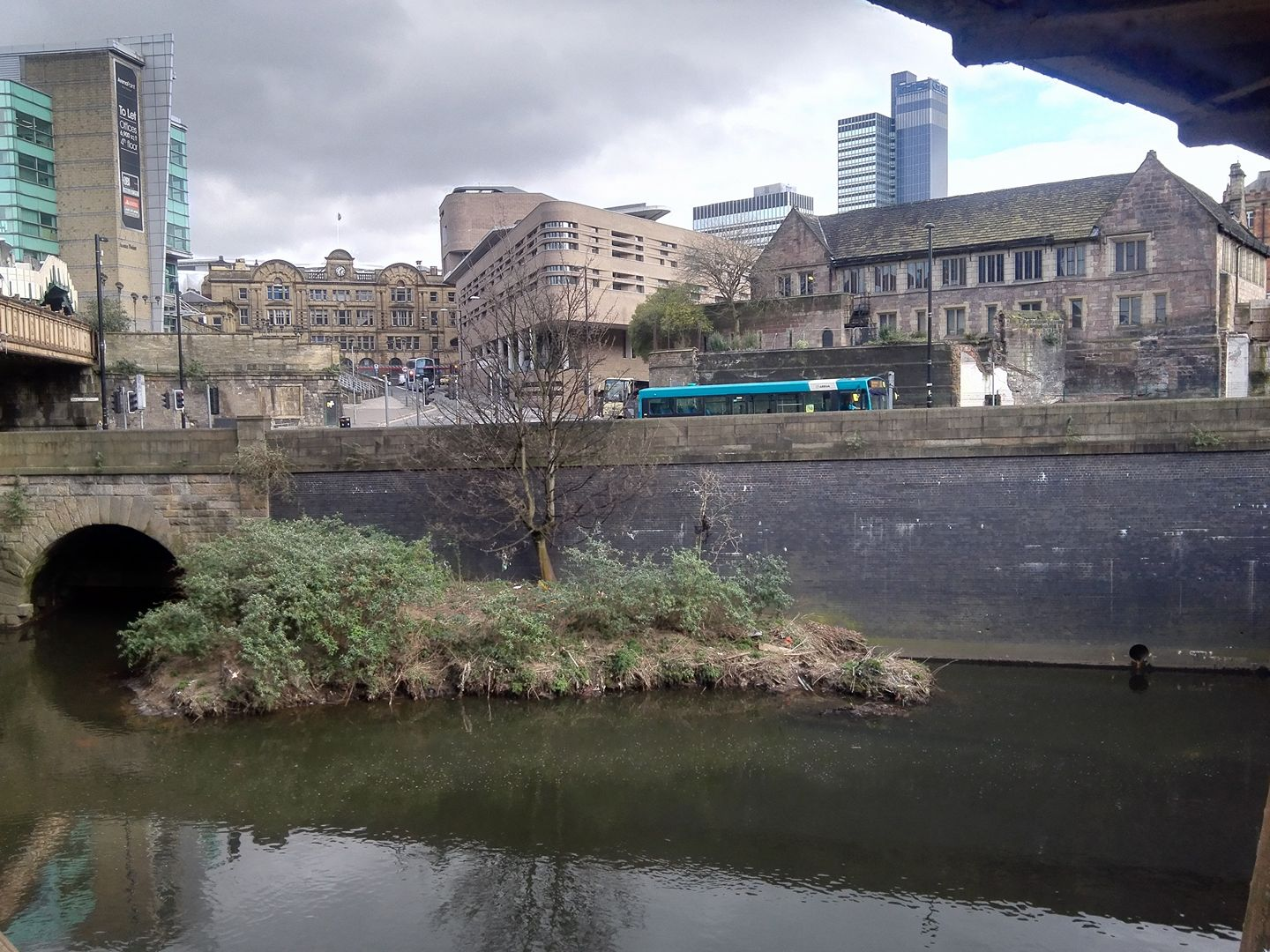
Photo of Chethams from the other side of the River Irwell

Manchester Castle was first referred to in 1184; in 1215 it was recorded as belonging to the Greslé family, who were barons of Manchester. This is the last historic reference to the castle. Before the manor house was built, Manchester Castle may have taken the form of a ringwork constructed from timber and with a wooden palisade. This earlier castle has been described as "of no political or military importance". Three rings of ditches have been discovered surrounding the likely site of the castle; however, these may be part of a Saxon burh or Norman castle.

In his book Warfare in England (1912), the author and historian Hilaire Belloc identified the "Manchester Gap", between the Pennines and the Mersey estuary, as one of the two most important defensive lines in medieval England, along with the line of the River Thames. Although Belloc ascribed great importance to Manchester and its supposed ability to hinder troop movements, the castle historian D. J. Cathcart King refuted this interpretation, nothing that the site was forgotten at an early date.

== See also ==
- History of Manchester
- List of castles in Greater Manchester
