= Rochdale Castle =

Medieval castle site in Greater Manchester, England

- Rochdale, Greater Manchester, England

Site information
- Type: Motte-and-bailey castle
- Condition: Destroyed; site built over

Location
- Location in Greater Manchester
- Coordinates: 53.611987°N 2.164396°W

Site history
- Built: Early post Norman Conquest

Rochdale Castle was a motte-and-bailey castle in Rochdale, Greater Manchester, England. Historically a part of Lancashire, it was built in the period shortly after the Norman Conquest of England.

In the 12th century, many charters refer to "the vill of the castle of Rachedal". A charter dated c. 1238 describes the castle as standing on rising ground commanding the valley of the Roche a location still known as Castle Hill. The castle was abandoned in the early 13th century. It was documented again in 1322.

In 1626 a Gabriel Tayor had a house on the site, known as Castle Hill, described as being on the "reputed site of a castle standing there, but now clean defaced". Buildings were later erected over the castle bailey and in the 19th century a house was built on the motte.

The motte is 100 feet (30 m) at the base; the bailey is rectangular, lies to the south, and measures 120 feet (37 m) by 100 feet (30 m). The defences consisted of an earth rampart and ditch.

== See also ==
- List of castles in Greater Manchester
