= WA postcode area =

Postcode area within the United Kingdom

Warrington
- Postcode area
- Location within the United Kingdom
- Coordinates: 53.391°N 2.594°W
- Sovereign state: United Kingdom
- Postcode area: WA
- Postcode area name: Warrington
- Post towns: 9
- Postcode districts: 18
- Postcode sectors: 97
- Postcodes (live): 18,090
- Postcodes (total): 25,555
- Statistics as at May 2020

The WA postcode area, also known as the Warrington postcode area, is a group of sixteen postcode districts in North West England, within nine post towns. These cover north Cheshire (including Warrington, Frodsham, Knutsford, Lymm, Runcorn and Widnes), eastern Merseyside (including St Helens and Newton-le-Willows) and small parts of south-western Greater Manchester (including Altrincham).

Mail for the WA postcode area is processed at Warrington Mail Centre, along with mail for the CW, L and WN postcode areas.

== Coverage ==
The approximate coverage of the postcode districts:

Postcode district	Post town	Coverage	Local authority area(s)
WA1	WARRINGTON	Warrington, Town Centre, Woolston, Paddington, Orford	Warrington
WA2	WARRINGTON	Warrington, Dallam, Longford, Orford, Padgate, Winwick	Warrington
WA3	WARRINGTON	Lowton, Golborne, Birchwood, Rixton with Glazebrook, Culcheth, Astley (part), Lately Common (part)	Wigan, Warrington
WA4	WARRINGTON	Warrington, Latchford, Stockton Heath, Appleton, Grappenhall, Daresbury, Moore, Walton, Preston on the Hill, Whitley, Dutton, Antrobus (part)	Warrington, Halton, Cheshire West and Chester
WA5	WARRINGTON	Warrington, Burtonwood, Westbrook, Penketh, Great Sankey, White Cross	Warrington
WA6	FRODSHAM	Frodsham, Helsby	Cheshire West and Chester
WA7	RUNCORN	Runcorn	Halton
WA8	WIDNES	Widnes, Cronton	Halton, Knowsley
WA9	ST. HELENS	Clock Face, Sutton, Thatto Heath	St Helens
WA10	ST. HELENS	Eccleston, Moss Bank, West Park	St Helens
WA11	ST. HELENS	Crank, Haydock, Moss Bank, Rainford	St Helens
WA12	NEWTON-LE-WILLOWS	Newton-le-Willows, Earlestown	St Helens
WA13	LYMM	Lymm, Statham, Warburton	Warrington, Trafford
WA14	ALTRINCHAM	Altrincham (centre and west), Bowdon, Broadheath, Dunham Town, Timperley, Dunham Massey, Little Bollington	Trafford, Cheshire East
WA15	ALTRINCHAM	Altrincham (east), Ashley, Hale, Hale Barns, Timperley, Ringway	Trafford, Manchester, Cheshire East
WA16	KNUTSFORD	High Legh, Knutsford, Mobberley, Ollerton, Aston by Budworth (part)	Cheshire East, Cheshire West and Chester
WA55	WARRINGTON		non-geographic
WA88	WIDNES		non-geographic

The Frodsham post town was introduced in June 1999; the post town for WA6 had previously been Warrington.

== Map ==
WA postcode area map, showing postcode districts in red and post towns in grey text, with links to nearby CH, CW, L, M, SK and WN postcode areas.

== See also ==
- Postcode Address File
- List of postcode areas in the United Kingdom
