= Agden, Cheshire West and Chester =

Civil parish in Cheshire, England

Coordinates: 52.992°N 2.729°W

Agden
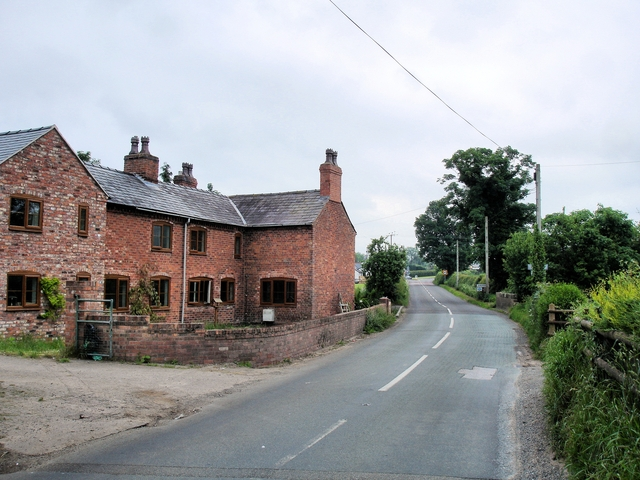
- Oldhall Street, Agden

- Location within Cheshire
- OS grid reference: SJ512441
- Civil parish: Agden
- Unitary authority: Cheshire West and Chester
- Ceremonial county: Cheshire
- Region: North West
- Country: England
- Sovereign state: United Kingdom
- Post town: WHITCHURCH
- Postcode district: SY13
- Dialling code: 01948
- Police: Cheshire
- Fire: Cheshire
- Ambulance: North West
- UK Parliament: Chester South and Eddisbury

Agden is a small civil parish in the unitary authority of Cheshire West and Chester and the ceremonial county of Cheshire, England. It is the site of Agden Hall. The parish has a parish meeting rather than a parish council. The area is mostly made up of farmland, with just a small population now having residence in the area. At the 2001 census it had a population of 42, compared to a peak of 98 reported in 1851.

Agden is located just 3 miles outside of the market town Whitchurch, and 2.5 miles from Malpas.

In 1870, John Marius Wilson's Imperial Gazetteer of England and Wales described Agden "a township in Malpas parish, Cheshire; 3 miles NW of Whitchurch. Acres, 548. Real property, £699. Pop., 110. Houses, 21"

== History ==
Agden was a township and chapelry in Malpas ancient parish, Broxton hundred (SJ 5143), which became a civil parish in 1866.

== See also ==
- Listed buildings in Agden, Cheshire West and Chester
