= Agden, Cheshire East =

Former civil parish in Cheshire, England

Coordinates: 53.370°N 2.413°W

Agden
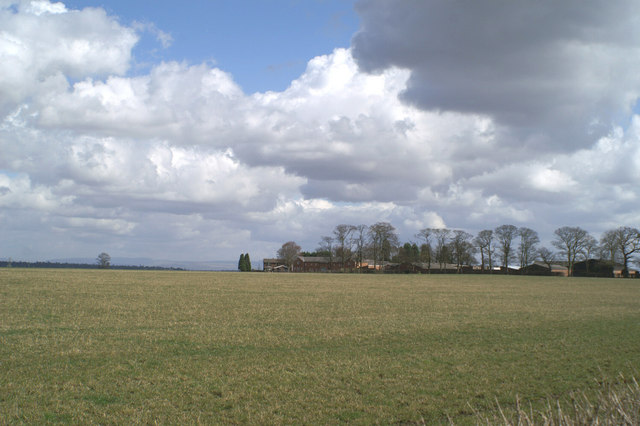
- Agden Hall

- Location within Cheshire
- Population: 146
- OS grid reference: SJ725859
- Civil parish: Little Bollington with Agden
- Unitary authority: Cheshire East
- Ceremonial county: Cheshire
- Region: North West
- Country: England
- Sovereign state: United Kingdom
- Post town: ALTRINCHAM
- Postcode district: WA14
- Dialling code: 01925
- Police: Cheshire
- Fire: Cheshire
- Ambulance: North West
- UK Parliament: Tatton

Agden is a former civil parish, now in the parish of Little Bollington with Agden, in the borough of Cheshire East and the ceremonial county of Cheshire, England. It is near High Legh, and about 15 miles (24 km) south-west from Manchester City Centre. It is the site of Agden Hall. According to the 2001 census, the population of the civil parish was 146. Because the population is so small, it did not have a parish council, instead, relying on a parish meeting.

== History ==
Agden was formerly a township in the parishes of Bowden and Rostherne. In 1866, Agden became a civil parish. On April 1, 2023, the parish was abolished to form "Little Bollington with Agden".
