= Watch Hill Castle =

Medieval earthwork castle site in Greater Manchester, England

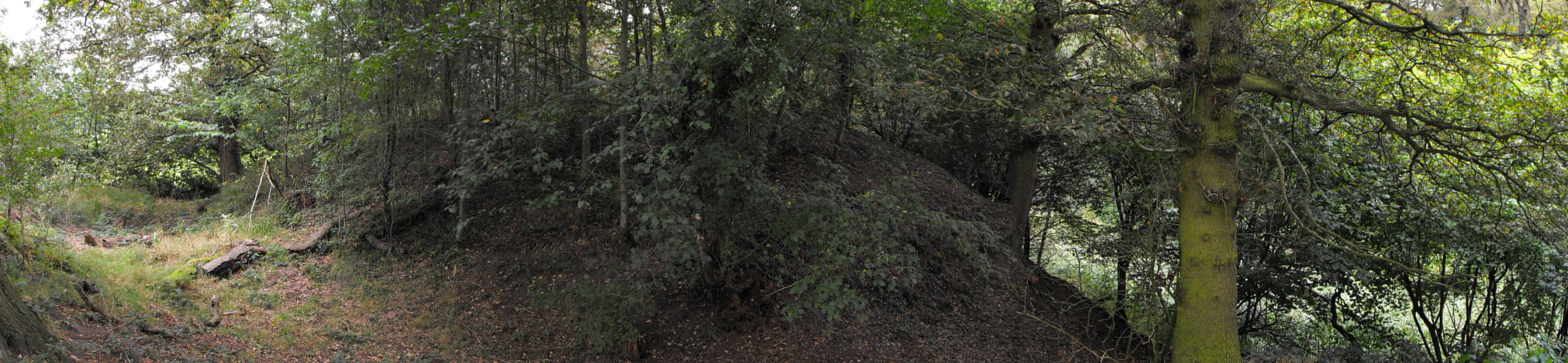
- The motte in 2009

- Location within Greater Manchester

General information
- Architectural style: Motte-and-bailey castle
- Location: Bowdon, Greater Manchester, England
- Coordinates: 53.3704°N 2.3813°W
- Completed: 12th century (probable)
- Owner: Hamo de Mascy

Technical details
- Size: 0.37 ha (0.91 acres)

Design and construction
- Designations

Scheduled monument
- Official name: Watch Hill motte and bailey castle, 450m south of Streethead Farm
- Designated: 24 February 1978
- Reference no.: 1014377

Watch Hill Castle (also known as Yarwood Castle, Castle Hill, and Bowdon Watch) is a medieval motte-and-bailey on the boundary of Bowdon and Dunham Massey in the Metropolitan Borough of Trafford, Greater Manchester, England. Historically part of Cheshire, it is a scheduled monument. The castle stands north of the River Bollin and south of a deep ravine (grid reference SJ74798598).

== History ==
Substantial dating evidence has not been recovered from the site, but the form of the castle as a timber motte-and-bailey suggests a date between the Norman Conquest and the 13th century. The lack of documentary evidence relating to the castle may be attributed to the short-term nature of timber construction; motte-and-baileys were quick to establish and were not necessarily used for long periods. A coin found on the site, dating to the reign of Henry II (1154 to 1189), may indicate that the castle was built during this period. The castle most likely belonged to Hamo de Mascy, who was involved in the rebellion against Henry II in 1173. It had fallen out of use by the 13th century.

=== Later history and investigation ===
In the 19th century, W. T. Pownall found a penny from the reign of Henry II at the castle.

In 1976 the North Cheshire Archaeology Group carried out excavations at the castle under the direction of Barry Johnson. The aims of the dig were to find dating evidence for the castle's foundation and to establish whether it was a motte-and-bailey. Although no dating evidence was recovered from the four trenches that were opened, hearths and potholes were discovered on top of the motte.

The castle was designated a scheduled monument in 1978. As the only scheduled monument in Trafford, it is arguably the most important archaeological site in the borough. Volunteers from South Trafford Archaeological Group (STAG) and students from the University of Manchester carried out a measured survey of the earthworks in 1997. STAG also conducted a geophysical survey in 2005 and established the position of the bailey's eastern ditch.

== Layout ==
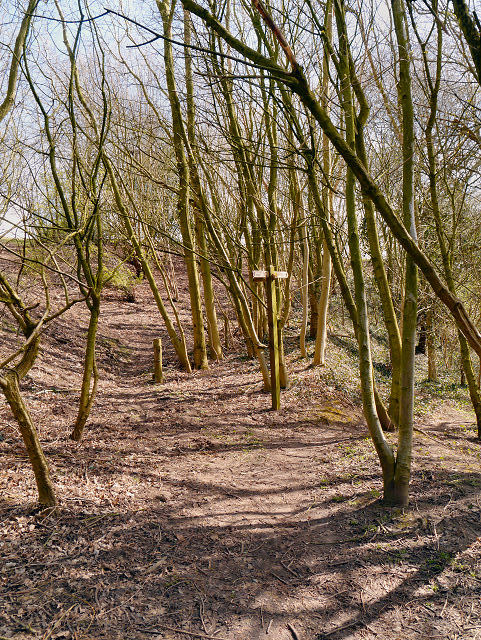
Bollin Valley Way, on the earthworks of Ward Hill Castle

The remains of Watch Hill Castle consist of two parts: an artificial mound (a motte) and an enclosure (a bailey). The motte is 6 m (20 ft) tall and is 40 m (130 ft) wide at the base and 17 m (56 ft) at the top. It is surrounded by a ditch 5 m (16 ft) wide and 3 m (10 ft) deep. The bailey covered a triangular area of approximately 2,400 m^{2} (0.59 acres) and lay to the east of the motte. It was enclosed by an earthen rampart, which survives to a height of 0.3 m (1 ft) in some places and would have been topped by a palisade. The north side of the bailey was doubly protected by the terrain sloping away steeply, and the south side was protected by the river.

== Conservation ==
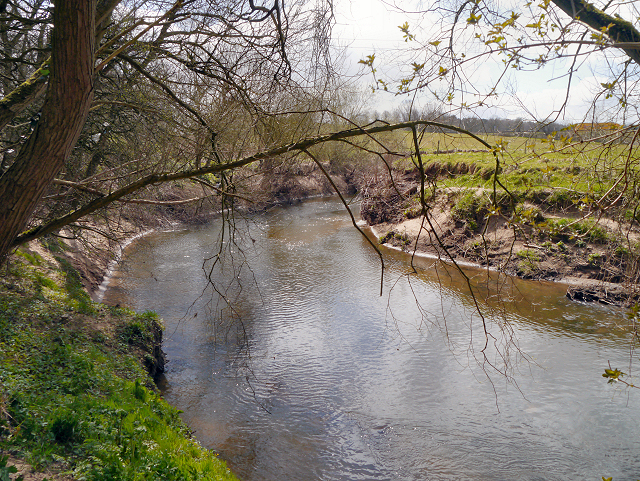
The River Bollin flows near the castle, posing a conservation challenge when it floods

Writing in the mid-1980s, archaeologists Keri Brown and Barry Johnson observed that the motte was overgrown with trees and that a footpath was causing erosion. Watch Hill Castle's proximity to the River Bollin presents a conservation challenge. As the 21st century progresses, the river is increasingly likely to flood as a result of climate change, which could erode the remains of the castle.

== See also ==
- List of castles in Greater Manchester
- Scheduled monuments in Greater Manchester
