= Radcliffe Tower =

Ruined tower in Greater Manchester, England

Coordinates: 53.5638°N 2.3098°W

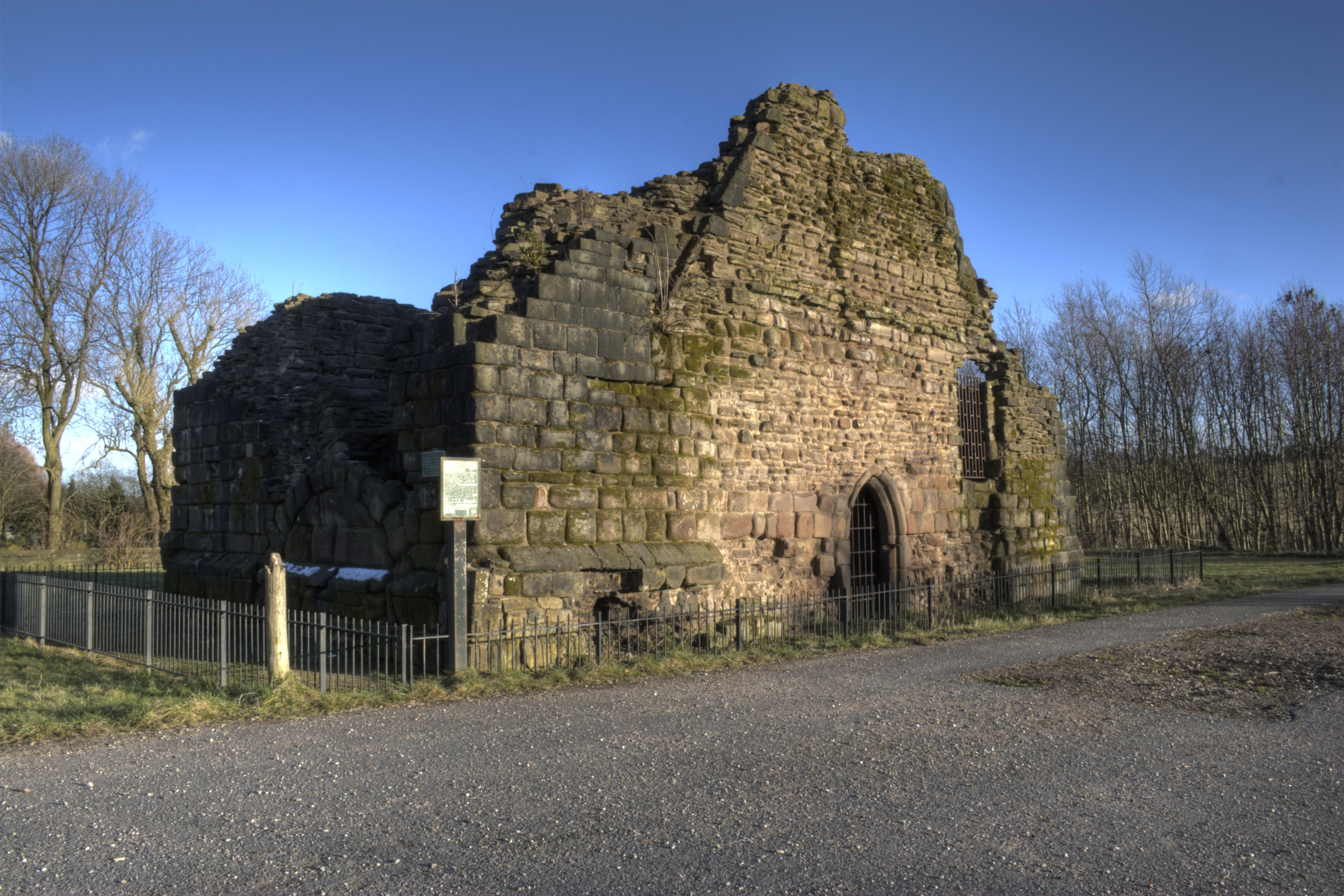
- The standing remains of Radcliffe Tower

- Location within Greater Manchester

General information
- Location: Radcliffe, Greater Manchester, England
- Owner: Bury Council

Design and construction
- Designations

Scheduled monument
- Official name: Radcliffe Tower and site of hall 100m south west of the parish church in Radcliffe
- Designated: 26 June 1924
- Reference no.: 1014721

Listed Building – Grade I
- Official name: Radcliffe Tower
- Designated: 28 July 1966
- Reference no.: 1309271

Radcliffe Tower is the only surviving part of a manor house in Radcliffe, a market town in the Metropolitan Borough of Bury, Greater Manchester (historically in Lancashire), England. It is a scheduled monument and a Grade I listed building. The house was rebuilt in 1403 by James de Radcliffe, lord of the manor of Radcliffe, and comprised a stone-built hall and one or two towers, probably constructed with ashlar blocks. De Radcliffe was granted a royal licence to fortify the site, including the addition of crenellations and battlements.

The manor house was demolished in the 19th century, leaving only the tower, which measures 31.5 feet (9.6 m) by 57 feet (17 m) and survives to a height of about 20 ft (6.1 m). The remains are owned by Bury Council. It was used as a pigsty before being restored. Radcliffe Tower is about 3.3 kilometres (2.1 mi) south of Bury Castle, a late 15th-century moated manor house.

In 2009 plans to restore the shell of the tower as part of a wider restoration project covering Radcliffe E'es, Close Park, and the parish church of St Mary were launched with the support of Bury Council.

Since 2012, archaeological excavations funded by the Heritage Lottery Fund have uncovered medieval glazed floor tiles, roof tiles, and pottery from the 15th century.

== Gallery ==
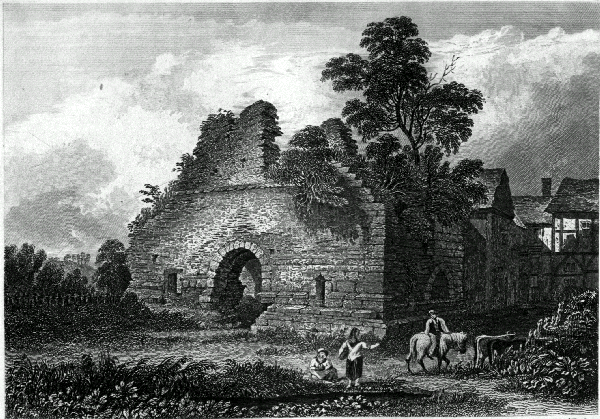
The tower in the early 19th century with the manor house on the right prior to its demolition

== See also ==
- Grade I listed buildings in Greater Manchester
- List of castles in Greater Manchester
- Listed buildings in Radcliffe, Greater Manchester
- Scheduled monuments in Greater Manchester
