= Hamon de Massey =

Anglo-Norman noble

The first Hamon de Masci/Massey was the owner of the manors of Agden, Baguley, Bowdon, Dunham, Hale and Little Bollington after the Norman conquest of England (1066), taking over from the Saxon thegn Aelfward according to Domesday Book. He was possibly the son of Guillaume de Macé, born in La Ferté-Macé or Ferté de La Macé, a recently constructed fortress in Normandy. Hamon was made a baron by Hugh Lupus, by his right as Earl of Chester, from 1071.

The name of Hamon de Massey was passed on to his descendants for several generations. There are several different ways of spelling the name, including "de Masci", "de Macé", "de Macei", "de Mascy", "de Massy" and "de Massie". Later the name Baguley was adopted by the family as it was the site of their main property, and there are also many variations of this name as well. A Massey daughter, Margaret, married Henry FitzRobert de Trafford, several generations later.
