= Bowdon, Greater Manchester =

Village in Trafford, England

Coordinates: 53.376°N 2.366°W

Bowdon
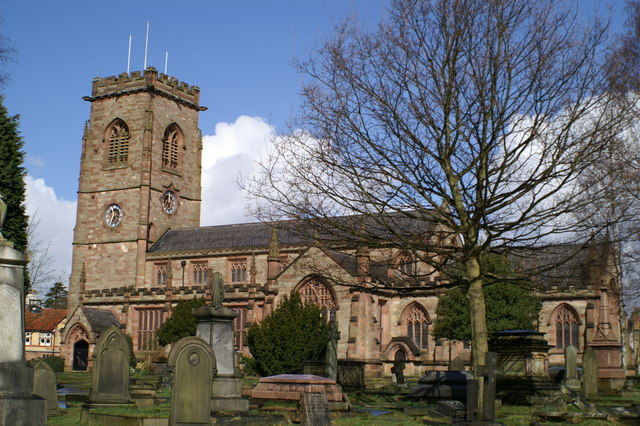
- Church of St Mary the Virgin in 2006

- Location within Greater Manchester
- Population: 9,228 (2011 census)
- Metropolitan borough: Trafford
- Metropolitan county: Greater Manchester
- Region: North West
- Country: England
- Sovereign state: United Kingdom
- Post town: ALTRINCHAM
- Postcode district: WA14
- Dialling code: 0161
- Police: Greater Manchester
- Fire: Greater Manchester
- Ambulance: North West
- UK Parliament: Altrincham and Sale West

Bowdon is a village and electoral ward in the Metropolitan Borough of Trafford, Greater Manchester, England. It is a suburb of Altrincham, lying within the historic county boundaries of Cheshire. It became part of Greater Manchester in 1974.

== History ==
The name Bowdon came from Anglo-Saxon Boga-dūn = "bow (weapon)-hill" or "curved hill".

Bowdon and nearby Dunham Massey are both mentioned in the Domesday Book, citing the existence of a church and a mill in Bowdon, and Dunham Massey is identified as Doneham: Hamo de Mascy.

Both areas came under Hamo de Masci in Norman times. His base was a wooden castle at Dunham. Watch Hill Castle was built on the border between Bowdon and Dunham Massey between the Norman Conquest and the 13th century. The timber castle most likely belonged to Hamo de Mascy; the castle had fallen out of use by the 13th century. The last Hamo de Masci died in 1342. The Black Death came to the area in 1348. Before 1494, the ruins of the castle at Dunham were acquired by Sir Robert Booth. In 1750, this and the other Booth estates passed to the Earl of Stamford by his marriage to Lady Mary Booth. The 10th and last Earl of Stamford died in 1976, who bequeathed Dunham Massey and his Carrington estates to the National Trust.

The development of Bowdon as a residential area began apace in the 1840s, when the landowners of the area sold off parcels of land. The opening of Bowdon railway station in 1849 provided a commuter route to the centre of Manchester, making the clean air and tranquility of the Bowdon Downs more attractive to developers. Initially, terraces and semi-detached houses were built, but by the 1860s and 1870s, the 'merchant princes' had built the large houses on Green Walk which are still a defining feature of the ward. By 1878, Kelly's Directory was describing Bowdon as "studded with handsome villas and mansions", and around 60% of the residents were business owners. Mains water appeared in 1864, and gas lighting by 1865.

The Altrincham History Society Tour highlights historical facts about Bowdon:

- The listed Altrincham/Dunham boundary stone of 1840 is in the garden wall of number 1 Higher Downs at the bottom right. This indicates the boundary of the ancient (1290) Borough of Altrincham with Dunham Massey.
- The area from the Devisdale across to The Downs was known as Bowdon Downs until about 1750 and was used as a common. 10,000 of Prince Rupert's troops camped here and on Knutsford Heath in May 1644 on their way from Shrewsbury to Marston Moor during the Civil War. In December 1688, Lord Delamer, later the Earl of Warrington, rallied forces here from his tenants in support of the Prince of Orange, afterwards William III, who had arrived in England.
- The Altrincham Show used to be held on The Devisdale, Bowdon until 1966. Farmers came from as far afield as Scotland, Cornwall and Norfolk to show cattle.

== Governance ==
There is one main tier of local government covering Bowdon, at metropolitan borough level: Trafford Council. The council is a member of the Greater Manchester Combined Authority, which is led by the directly-elected Mayor of Greater Manchester. The Bowdon ward is used for electing councillors to Trafford Council.

=== Administrative history ===
Bowdon was an ancient parish, which formed part of the Bucklow Hundred of Cheshire. The parish was large, being subdivided into numerous townships. Ashton upon Mersey appears to have historically been part of Bowdon parish, but had become a separate parish by 1350.

Bowdon parish then comprised the townships of Altrincham, Ashley, Bollington, Carrington, Dunham Massey, Hale, Partington, Timperley, and a Bowdon township covering the central part of the parish around the village itself. The parish also included most of the township of Baguley and part of the township of Agden. From the 17th century onwards, parishes were gradually given various civil functions under the poor laws, in addition to their original ecclesiastical functions. In some cases, including Bowdon, the civil functions were exercised by the townships rather than the parish as a whole. In 1866, the legal definition of 'parish' was changed to be the areas used for administering the poor laws, and so the townships each became separate civil parishes.

The Bowdon township was made a local government district in 1864, administered by an elected local board. Such districts were reconstituted as urban districts under the Local Government Act 1894.

Bowdon Urban District was abolished in 1974 under the Local Government Act 1972. The area became part of the Metropolitan Borough of Trafford in Greater Manchester.

=== Political representation ===
Bowdon was in the parliamentary constituency of Altrincham from 1885 until 1945; in Bucklow from 1945 until 1950; in Knutsford from 1950 until 1983; and in Altrincham and Sale from 1983 until 1997. Bowdon has been part of the parliamentary constituency of Altrincham and Sale West since 1997.

== Geography ==
Bowdon is located at the southwest edge of Greater Manchester. It is situated on a ridge which rises above the Cheshire Plain. Bowdon is the largest ward in the Metropolitan Borough of Trafford, and comprises several small, rural villages surrounded by open countryside, including Dunham Massey Country Park and other more densely populated residential areas.

It has been described as an affluent and attractive place to live.

The majority of the ward is owned by the National Trust as part of the Dunham Massey Estate, which serves as a significant communal asset for the residents of the local and wider areas. The estate includes Dunham Massey Hall and a deer park. Bowdon is a semi-rural ward and has a low population density.

=== Divisions and suburbs ===
There are four distinct neighbourhoods of Bowdon:

- Dunham Massey
- Warburton
- Bowdon
- Bowdon Vale

== Demography ==
According to a Trafford Metropolitan Council report, the population of Bowdon in 2001 was 8,806. 1,730 were under 16 and 1,699 were 65 and over. In 2004, the majority of residents (8,343) described themselves as white. Out of 8,414 wards of the United Kingdom, Bowdon ranks as 8,235th in terms of deprivation, indicating that only 2.2% of UK wards suffer less deprivation.

In 1931, 27.6% of Bowdon's population was middle class compared with 14% in England and Wales, and by 1971, this had increased to 58.9% compared with 24% nationally. Parallel to this doubling of the middle classes in Bowdon was the decline of the working class population. In 1931, 16.1% were working class compared with 36% in England and Wales; by 1971, this had decreased to 14.7% in Bowdon and 26% nationwide. The rest of the population was made up of clerical workers and skilled manual workers or other miscellaneous.

== Education ==
Bowdon contains both state and independent schools.

State schools

- Bollin Primary School
- Bowdon CE Primary School
- Altrincham Grammar School for Girls, Cavendish Road, Bowdon
- Altrincham Grammar School For Boys, Marlborough Road, Bowdon

Independent schools

- Altrincham Preparatory School, Marlborough Road, Bowdon.
- Bowdon Preparatory School, Stamford Road, Bowdon.

== Religion ==
Bowdon Parish is part of the Archdeaconry of Macclesfield within the Anglican Diocese of Chester. The parish covers a number of churches in the south west part of the Greater Manchester conurbation, including: Altrincham St George, Altrincham St John, Ashley, Ashton upon Mersey St Martin, Ashton upon Mersey St Mary Magdalene, Bowdon, Broadheath, Dunham Massey St Margaret, Dunham Massey St Mark, Hale, Oughtrington, Partington and Carrington, Ringway, Sale St Anne, Sale St Paul, Timperley and Warburton. The main parish church of St Mary the Virgin can be seen very clearly from the Cheshire Plain.

Bowdon Vale Methodist Church has had a presence in the area since 1883.

The registers of baptisms 1628–1964, marriages 1628–1964 and burials 1628–1973 have been deposited at the Cheshire Record Office.

== Leisure and recreation ==
- Dunham Massey – formerly the home of the last Earl of Stamford, it was acquired by the National Trust in 1976. It was built on the site of the original Tudor house. The current property is described as "a Country estate including mansion with important collections and 'below stairs' areas, impressive garden and deer park";
- Bowdon Cricket Club, Hockey and Squash Club
- Bowdon Vale Cricket Club – founded in the early 1870s and is a member of the Cheshire Cricket League
- Bowdon Rugby Union Football Club – HQ is now in Timperley – founded in 1877
- Bowdon Lawn Tennis Club – founded 1877
- Bowdon Bowling and Lawn Tennis Club – founded in 1873
- Bowdon Croquet Club – founded in 1873
- Bowdon Golf Club, Dunham Massey (now defunct) was founded in 1890. The club continued until the early 1950s.

== Notable people ==
Notable local residents have included:

- Ernest Francis Bashford, (1873–1923) – oncologist
- Michael Bishop, Baron Glendonbrook – chairman of British Midland Airways Ltd and Conservative member of the House of Lords was born in Bowdon
- Adolph Brodsky, (1851–1929) – the violinist, lived with his family in their house on East Downs Road
- Thomas Coward, (1867–1933) – ornithologist was born at 6 Higher Downs in 1861. He wrote The Birds of Cheshire in 1900.
- Stirling Gallacher – actress born in Bowdon
- John Ireland, (1879–1962) – composer
- John F. Leeming, (1895–1965) – founder of the Lancashire Aero Club lived in Bowdon for many years and built aircraft in his garage during 1922/23
- Johnny Marr – former guitarist and co-songwriter of British alternative rock band the Smiths, notably wrote songs from the studio album The Queen Is Dead (1986) in his Bowdon home with bandmate Morrissey.
- Sir Alexander Paterson, (1884–1947) – the reforming penologist, was born in Bowdon in 1884
- Thomas B. Pitfield, (1903–1999) – composer
- Hans Richter, (1843–1916) – conductor. Many visiting musicians stayed a Richter's house in The Firs, including the composer Bela Bartók
- Paul Spicer – composer and conductor
- Richard Sykes, (1839–1923) – local businessman and a pioneer of Rugby Football, lived in Bowdon and owned land in North Dakota, USA. He founded the town of Bowdon, North Dakota in 1899 which he named in tribute to his residence here.
- Fred Talbot – television presenter (later convicted sex offender)
- Alison Uttley, (1884–1976) – moved to Bowdon in 1924 and wrote the Little Grey Rabbit books while living in Bowdon. There is a blue plaque at Downs House, 13 Higher Downs, Bowdon, where she lived from 1924 to 1938.
- Christopher Webber – actor, writer and music critic, an authority on Spanish zarzuela

== See also ==
- Listed buildings in Bowdon, Greater Manchester
- List of people from Trafford
