= Copley (surname) =

Copley is an English surname. Notable people with the surname include:

- Al Copley (born 1952), American jazz pianist
- Amber Copley, American beauty queen
- Antony Copley (1937–2016), British historian
- Dale Copley (born 1991), Australian rugby league player
- David C. Copley (1952–2012), American newspaper publisher
- Evan Copley (1930–2018), American academic and composer
- Florrie Copley, Jersey cricketer
- Sir Godfrey Copley, 2nd Baronet (1653–1709), English landowner
- Henri Édouard de Copley, interim Governor of Guadeloupe from 1764 to 1765
- Ira Clifton Copley (1864–1947), American publisher and politician
- James S. Copley (1916–1973), American publisher and journalist
- John Copley (producer) (born 1933), British theatre producer
- John Copley (artist) (1875–1950), British artist
- John Singleton Copley (1738–1815), Anglo-American portrait painter
- John Copley, 1st Baron Lyndhurst (1772–1863), British lawyer and politician
- Lionel Copley
- Sir Lionel Copley, 2nd Baronet
- Martin Copley (conservationist) (1940–2014), Australian conservationist
- Mary Sibbey Copley (1843–1929), American philanthropist
- Paul Copley (born 1944), British actor
- Pheonix Copley (born 1992), American ice hockey goaltender
- Rebecca Copley, American soprano opera singer
- Samuel William Copley (1859–1937), English businessman in Australia
- Sharlto Copley (born 1973), South African actor
- Terence Copley (1946–2011), British author
- Teri Copley (born 1961), American actress
- Tom Copley (born 1985), British politician
- Vince Copley (1936–2022), Aboriginal Australian activist, elder, and leader
- William Copley (artist) (1919–1996), American artist
- William Copley (Queensland politician) (1906–1975), Australian trade union activist
- William Copley (South Australian politician) (1845–1925)
