= Copely =

Copely is a surname. Notable people with the surname include:

- Dean Copely (born 1989), American ice dancer
- Katherine Copely (born 1988), American ice dancer
- Marc Copely, American guitarist and songwriter

== See also ==
- Copley (disambiguation)
