= Copley =

Copley may refer to:

== People ==
- Copley (surname)

== Places ==
=== Australia ===
- Copley, South Australia

=== United Kingdom ===
- Copley, County Durham
- Copley, Greater Manchester, formerly in Cheshire
  - Copley Academy, a school
- Copley, West Yorkshire

=== United States of America ===
- Copley Place, an indoor shopping mall in Boston
- Copley Square in Boston
  - Copley (MBTA station), at that square
- Fairmont Copley Plaza Hotel in Boston on Copley Square
- Copley, Ohio
- Copley Township, Ohio
  - Copley High School
  - 2011 Copley Township shooting
- Coplay, Pennsylvania
- Copley, West Virginia

== Other uses ==
- Copley Medal, a scientific award granted by the Royal Society of London
- Copley Press, a California-based newspaper publisher
- Copley (crater), a crater on Mercury
