= Joseph Copley =

Joseph Copley may refer to:

- Sir Joseph Copley, 1st Baronet (died 1781), Clerk of the Signet, of the Copley Baronets
- Sir Joseph Copley, 3rd Baronet (c. 1769–1838) of the Copley Baronets
- Sir Joseph Copley, 4th Baronet (1804–1883) of the Copley Baronets

== See also ==
- Copley (surname)
