= Wild Bank =

Hill in Greater Manchester, England

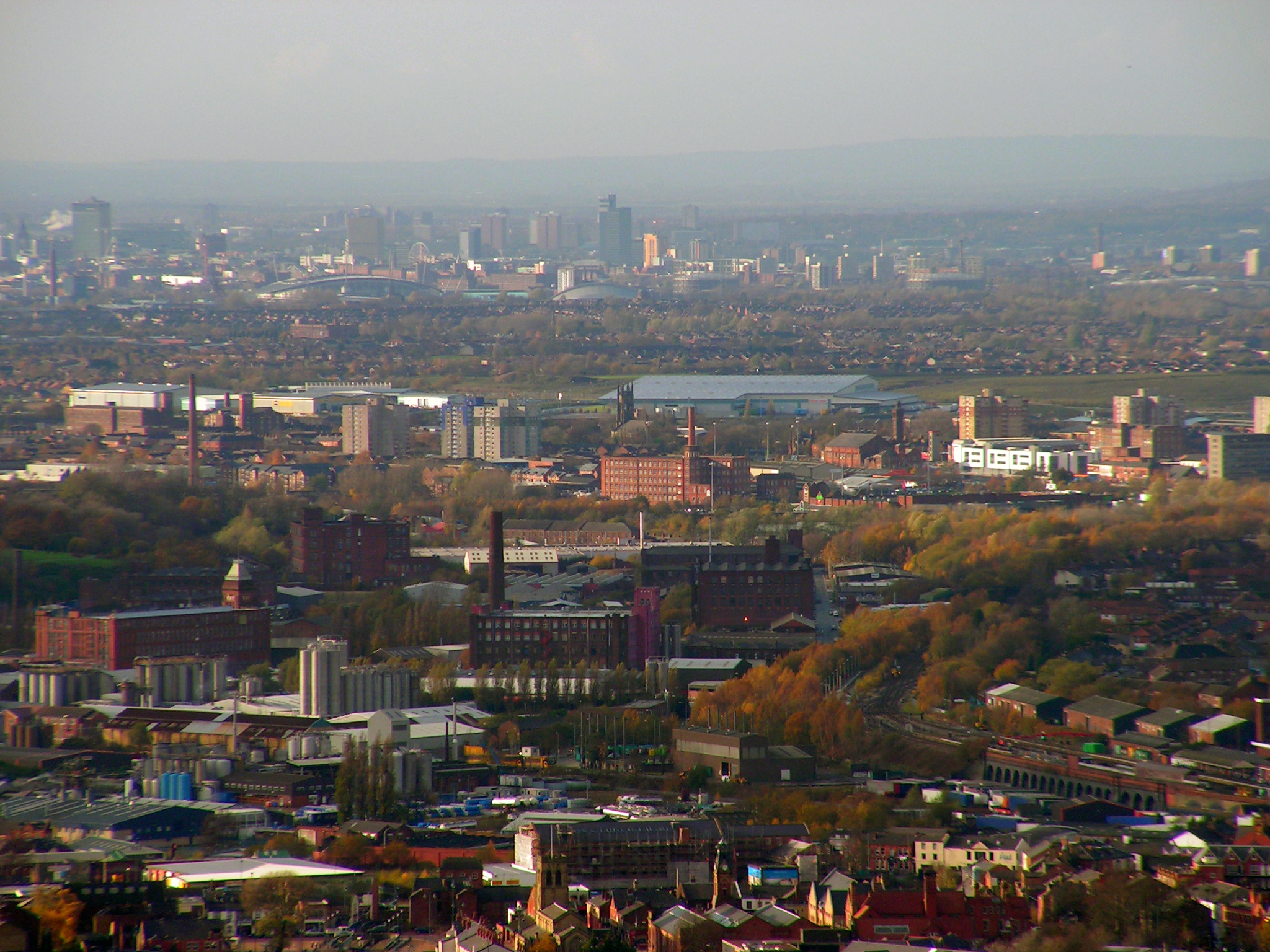
- Image taken from Hollingworthhall Moor of Stalybridge, Ashton-under-Lyne and the City of Manchester

Highest point
- Elevation: 399 m (1,309 ft)
- Prominence: 88 m (289 ft)
- Listing: (none)
- Coordinates: 53°28′43″N 2°01′10″W

Geography
- Location: Stalybridge, Greater Manchester, England
- Parent range: Peak District, Pennines
- OS grid: SJ988980
- Topo map: OS Landranger 109

Wild Bank is a hill in Stalybridge, just outside the Peak District National Park. Its western flank rises from the valley of the River Tame to a height of 399 metres (1,309 ft). To the east of the summit, the ground falls away more gradually to Shaw Moor and Hollingworthhall Moor, beyond which are Mottram in Longdendale and Hollingworth. Since 2004, the moorland in the area of the pike has been classed as access land. From the summit, the centre of Manchester, Winter Hill and the Cheshire Plain can be seen. On very clear days, the mountains of Snowdonia are visible.
