= Eastwood Nature Reserve =

Nature reserve in Greater Manchester, England

Coordinates: 53.4784°N 2.0483°W

Eastwood Nature Reserve is a 4.7-hectare (11.6-acre) nature reserve in Stalybridge, Tameside, England. It is managed by the Cheshire Wildlife Trust (CWT). The reserve was given to the Royal Society for the Protection of Birds (RSPB) by the Cheetham family in 1931 and became the first RSPB-owned reserve. The RSPB then leased it on to CWT.

The steep-sided clough has an extensive system of good pathways around it, enabling visitors to experience a blanket of bluebells in the spring as well as wood sorrel and wild angelica. There is also a wide variety of woodland birds, such as chaffinch, treecreeper and nuthatch, throughout the year. A stream runs through the entire length of the reserve into the old mill pond at Cheetham Mill just outside the reserve.
