= Stalybridge =

Town in Greater Manchester, England

Coordinates: 53.4834°N 2.0400°W

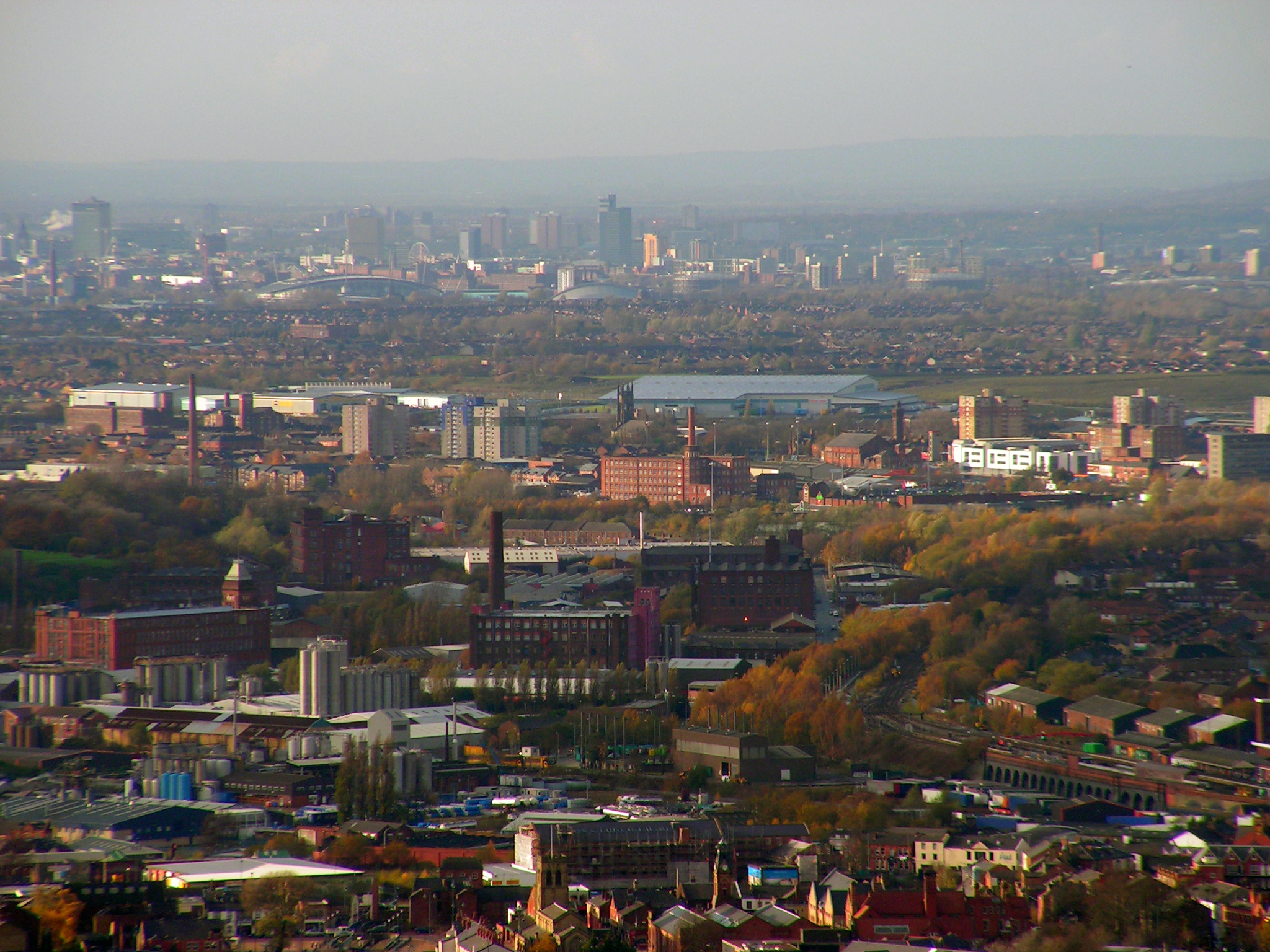
- View over Stalybridge

- Location within Greater Manchester
- Population: 26,830 (Built up area, 2021)
- OS grid reference: SJ963985
- Metropolitan borough: Tameside
- Metropolitan county: Greater Manchester
- Region: North West
- Country: England
- Sovereign state: United Kingdom
- Post town: Stalybridge
- Postcode district: SK15
- Dialling code: 0161 / 01457
- Police: Greater Manchester
- Fire: Greater Manchester
- Ambulance: North West
- UK Parliament: Stalybridge and Hyde

Stalybridge (/ˌsteɪliˈbrɪdʒ/) is a town in Tameside, Greater Manchester, England. At the 2021 census, it had a population of 26,830. Historically divided between Cheshire and Lancashire, it lies 8 miles (12.9 km) east of Manchester and 6 miles (9.7 km) north-west of Glossop.

When a water-powered cotton mill was constructed in 1776, Stalybridge became one of the first centres of textile manufacture during the Industrial Revolution. The wealth created in the 19th century from the factory-based cotton industry transformed an area of scattered farms and homesteads into a self-confident town.

== History ==
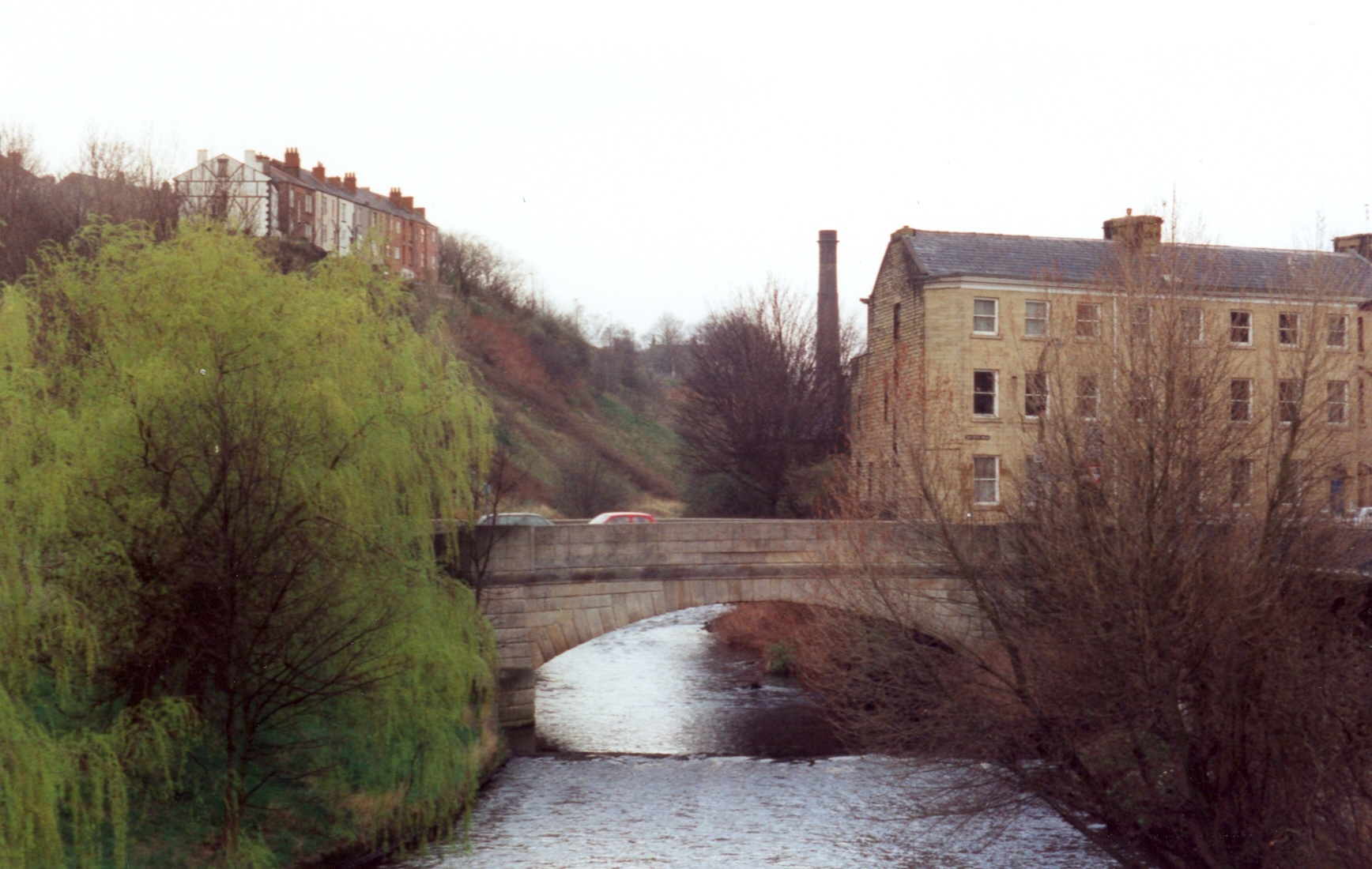
The river Tame flowing under Staley Bridge, constructed in 1707

=== Early history ===
The earliest evidence of human activity in Stalybridge is a flint scraper from the late Neolithic/early Bronze Age. Also bearing testament to the presence of man in prehistory are the Stalybridge cairns. The two monuments are on the summit of Hollingworthall Moor, 153 yards (140 m) apart. One of the round cairns is the best-preserved Bronze Age monument in Tameside and is protected as a scheduled monument. A branch of the Roman road between the forts at Manchester (Mamucium) and Melandra Castle (Ardotalia) is thought to run through Stalybridge to the fort of Castleshaw.

The settlement was originally called Stavelegh, which derives from the Old English stæf leah, meaning "wood where the staves are got". The medieval lords of the manor took de Stavelegh as their name, later becoming Stayley or Staley. The lordship of Longdendale was one of the ancient feudal estates of Cheshire and included the area of Stalybridge. Buckton Castle, near Stalybridge, was probably built by one of the earls of Chester in the 12th century. William de Neville was the first lord of Longdendale, appointed by the Earl of Chester between 1162 and 1186. The lordship of Longdendale included the manors of Staley, Godley, Hattersley, Hollingworth, Matley, Mottram, Newton, Tintwistle and Werneth; the manor of Staley was first mentioned between 1211 and 1225.

The first records of the de Stavelegh family as lords of the manor of Staley date from the early 13th century. Staley Hall was their residence. The present hall was built in the late 16th century, on the same site as an earlier hall of the Stayley family which dated from before 1343.

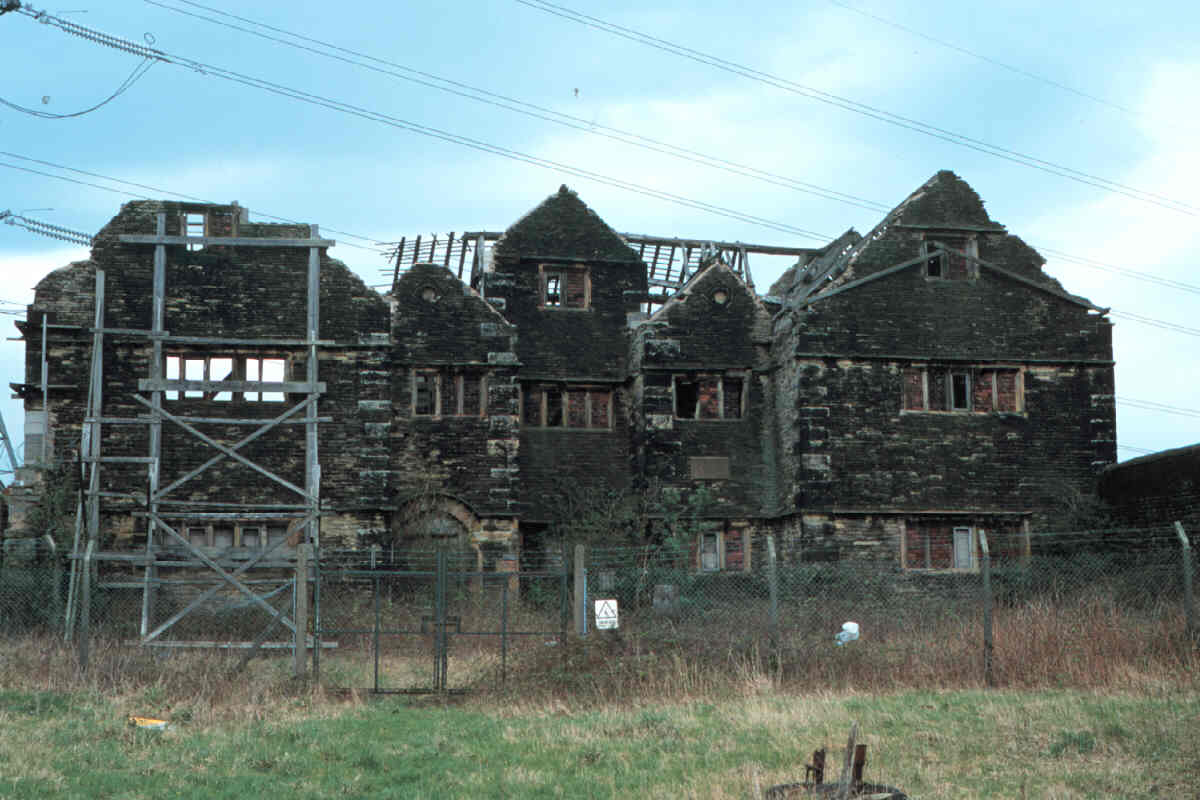
Staley Hall, before its refurbishment

Sir Ralph Staley (descendant of the de Stavelegh family) had no male heirs but an only daughter, Elizabeth Staley, who married Sir Thomas Assheton and united the manors of Ashton and Staley. Elizabeth and Thomas had two daughters and no sons. Margaret, the eldest of their two daughters, married Sir William Booth of Dunham Massey. The younger daughter Elizabeth was widowed and without children, and continued to live at Staley Hall until her death in 1553. In her will, her share of the lordships of Staley and Ashton were left to the Booths.

The manor of Staley remained in the possession of the Booth family until the death of George Booth, 2nd Earl of Warrington on 2 August 1758. Upon his death, the Earldom of Warrington became extinct. His only daughter, Lady Mary Booth, the wife of Harry Grey, 4th Earl of Stamford, inherited all the Booth estates. The manor of Staley was owned by the Grey family until the extinction of the Earldom of Stampford on the death of Roger Grey, 10th Earl of Stamford in 1976. At this point, the family estates were dispersed. Stamford Street, Grey Street, Groby Street, Stamford Park, Stamford Golf Club and the two Stamford Arms public houses in Stalybridge are all named after the Grey family.

=== Industrial Revolution ===
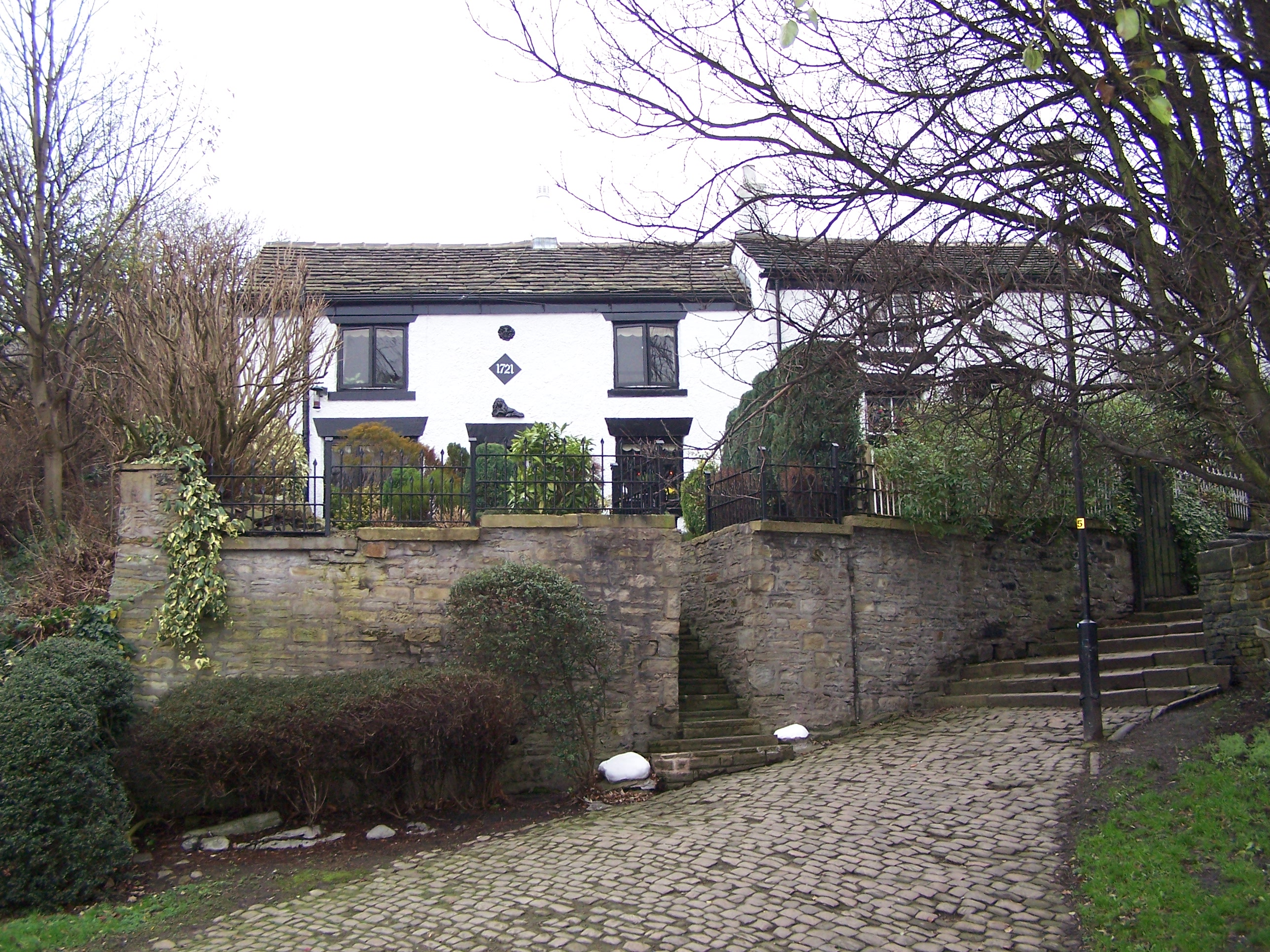
Bohemia Cottages; weavers' houses dating from 1721

As Stayley expanded in the 18th century, it reached the banks of the river Tame. After the construction of a bridge in 1707, the settlement was commonly referred to as Stalybridge, meaning the bridge at Stayley. By the mid-18th century, Stalybridge had a population of just 140; farming and woolen spinning were the main means of subsistence at this time.

In 1776, the town's first water-powered mill for carding and spinning cotton was built at Rassbottom. In 1789, the town's first spinning mill using the principle of Arkwright's water frame was built. By 1793, steam power had been introduced to the Stalybridge cotton industry; in 1803, there were eight cotton mills in the growing town containing 76,000 spindles. The Huddersfield Narrow Canal was completed in 1811 and still runs through the town.

The rapid growth of industry in Stalybridge was due to the introduction of machinery. This was, however, met with violent opposition. After the arrival of the Luddites in the area the doors of mills were kept locked day and night. Military aid was requested by the mill owners and a Scottish regiment under the Duke of Montrose was sent to the town. It was led by Captain Raines who made his headquarters at the Roe Cross Inn. Gangs of armed men destroyed power looms and fired mills. The disturbances in Stalybridge culminated with a night of violent rioting on 20 April 1812.

The social unrest did not curb the growth of Stalybridge. By 1814, there were twelve factories and, by 1818, the number had increased to 16. The Industrial Revolution led to a rapid increase in the town's population in the early part of the 19th century. The population of the town by 1823 was 5,500; in the following two years, partly because of an influx of Irish families seeking better wages, it rose to 9,000. Stalybridge was among the first wave of towns to establish a Mechanics' Institute with a view to educating the growing number of workers. Only a year after the establishment of Manchester Mechanics' Institute, Stalybridge founded an institute of its own. Its doors opened on 7 September 1825 on Shepley Street with a reading room on Queen Street.

On 9 May 1828, the Stalybridge Police and Market Act received royal assent, establishing Stalybridge as an independent town with a board of 21 commissioners. Every male over the age of 21 who was the occupier of a rateable property under the act was entitled to vote at the election of the commissioners. On 30 December 1831, Stalybridge Town Hall was officially opened. In 1833, the commissioners set up the Stalybridge Police Force, the first of its kind in the country. By this year, the population of the town had reached 14,216 with 2.357 inhabited houses.

In 1834, a second bridge was built over the Tame. It was downstream of Staley Bridge and constructed of iron.

The second Chartist petition was presented to Parliament in April 1842. Stalybridge contributed 10,000 signatures. After the rejection of the petition the first general strike began in the coal mines of Staffordshire. The second phase of the strike originated in Stalybridge. A movement of resistance to the imposition of wage cuts in the mills, also known as the Plug Riots, it spread to involve nearly half a million workers throughout Britain and represented the biggest single exercise of working class strength in 19th century Britain. On 13 August 1842, there was a strike at Bayley's Cotton Mill in Stalybridge and roving cohorts of operatives carried the stoppage first to the whole area of Stalybridge and Ashton, then to Manchester, and subsequently to towns adjacent to Manchester, using as much force as was necessary to bring mills to a standstill. The movement remained, to outward appearances, largely non-political. Although the People's Charter was praised at public meetings, the resolutions that were passed at these were in almost all cases merely for a restoration of the wages of 1820, a ten-hour working day, or reduced rents.

In writing The Condition of The Working Class in England (1844), Friedrich Engels used Stalybridge as an example:

...multitudes of courts, back lanes, and remote nooks arise out of [the] confused way of building ... Add to this the shocking filth, and the repulsive effect of Stalybridge, in spite of its pretty surroundings, may be readily imagined.

John Summers first established an iron forge in Stalybridge in the 1840s. Later, he and his sons developed this into a major business and employed over 1,000 local men in their factory, the largest in the town.

The Ashton, Stalybridge and Liverpool Junction Railway Company was formed on 19 July 1844 and the railway was connected to Stalybridge on 5 October 1846. On 9 July 1847, the company was acquired by the Lancashire and Yorkshire Railway. On 1 August 1849, the Manchester, Stockport and Leeds Railway connected Stalybridge to Huddersfield and later to Stockport; this line later became part of the London and North Western Railway.

==== The cotton famine ====
On the outbreak of the American Civil War in 1861, the Stalybridge cotton mills rapidly ran short of cotton. Thousands of operatives were laid off. In October 1862, a meeting was held in Stalybridge Town Hall that passed a resolution blaming the Confederate States of America and their actions in the American Civil War, rather than U.S. blockades of seaports, for the Lancashire Cotton Famine. By the winter of 1862/3, there were 7,000 unemployed operatives in the town; only five of the town's 39 factories and 24 machine shops were employing people full-time. Contributions were sent from all over the world for the relief of the cotton operatives in Lancashire; and at one point three-quarters of Stalybridge workers were dependent on relief schemes. By 1863, there were 750 empty houses in the town; around 1,000 skilled men and women left the town, in what became known as "The Panic".

In 1863, the relief committee decided to substitute a system of relief by ticket instead of money. The tickets were to be presented at local grocery shops. An organised resistance was organised culminating on 20 March 1863.

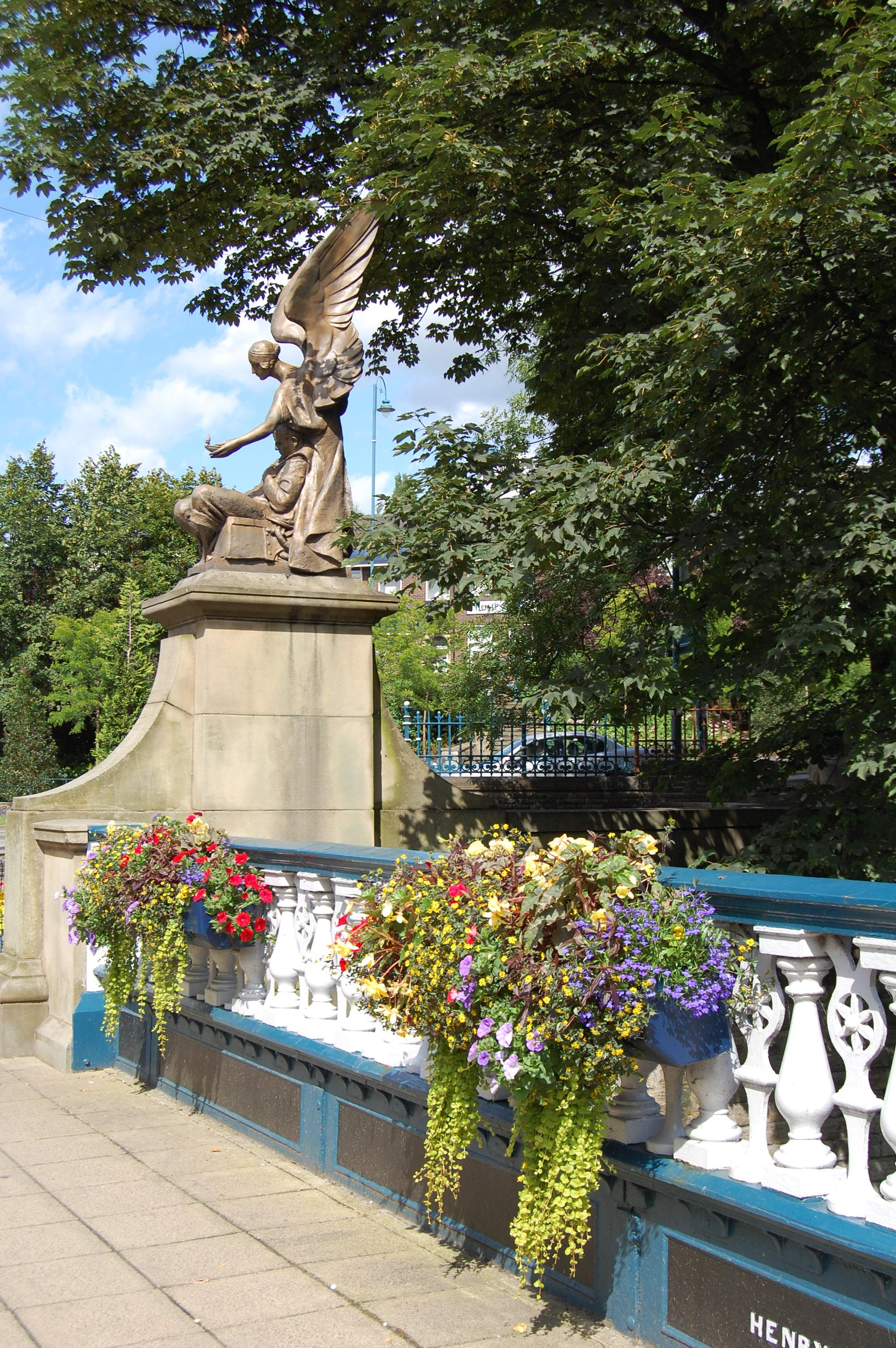
Victoria Bridge

In 1867, Stalybridge was disturbed by the arrival of William Murphy. Records of this man indicate that his sole interest was to sow the seeds of dissent between Roman Catholics, who by this time had grown to significant proportions, and Protestants. He succeeded in this goal only too well for a full year. During 1868, there were a number of violent disturbances and rioting created by this man who described himself as a "renegade Roman Catholic". In his lectures to the public, "pretending to expose the religious practices of the Roman Catholic Church", he became a master at whipping up a crowd into a frenzy. Newspaper reports of the time told of his common practice of waving a revolver in the air in "a most threatening manner". On one occasion, he incited a riot of such proportions that Fr. Daley, the parish priest of St Peter's, took to the roof of the church to defend it. A man was shot. The parish priest was tried but eventually acquitted at the Quarter Sessions. Following this incident, the community began to settle down and Murphy chose to extend his political activities elsewhere.

In 1867, the Victoria Bridge on Trinity Street was built. Victoria Market Hall was constructed in 1868 and the public baths were opened in May 1870. The baths were presented as a gift to the town by philanthropists and benefactors Robert Platt (1802–82), born in Stalybridge, and his wife Margaret Platt (1819–88), born in Salford.

Stalybridge Borough Band was formed in March 1871, holding its first rehearsals and meetings at the Moulder's Arms, Grasscroft Street, Castle Hall. The band was known as the 4th Cheshire Rifleman Volunteers (Borough Band) until 1896. The founder and first conductor was Alexander Owen, who conducted the band until at least 1907.

=== 20th century ===
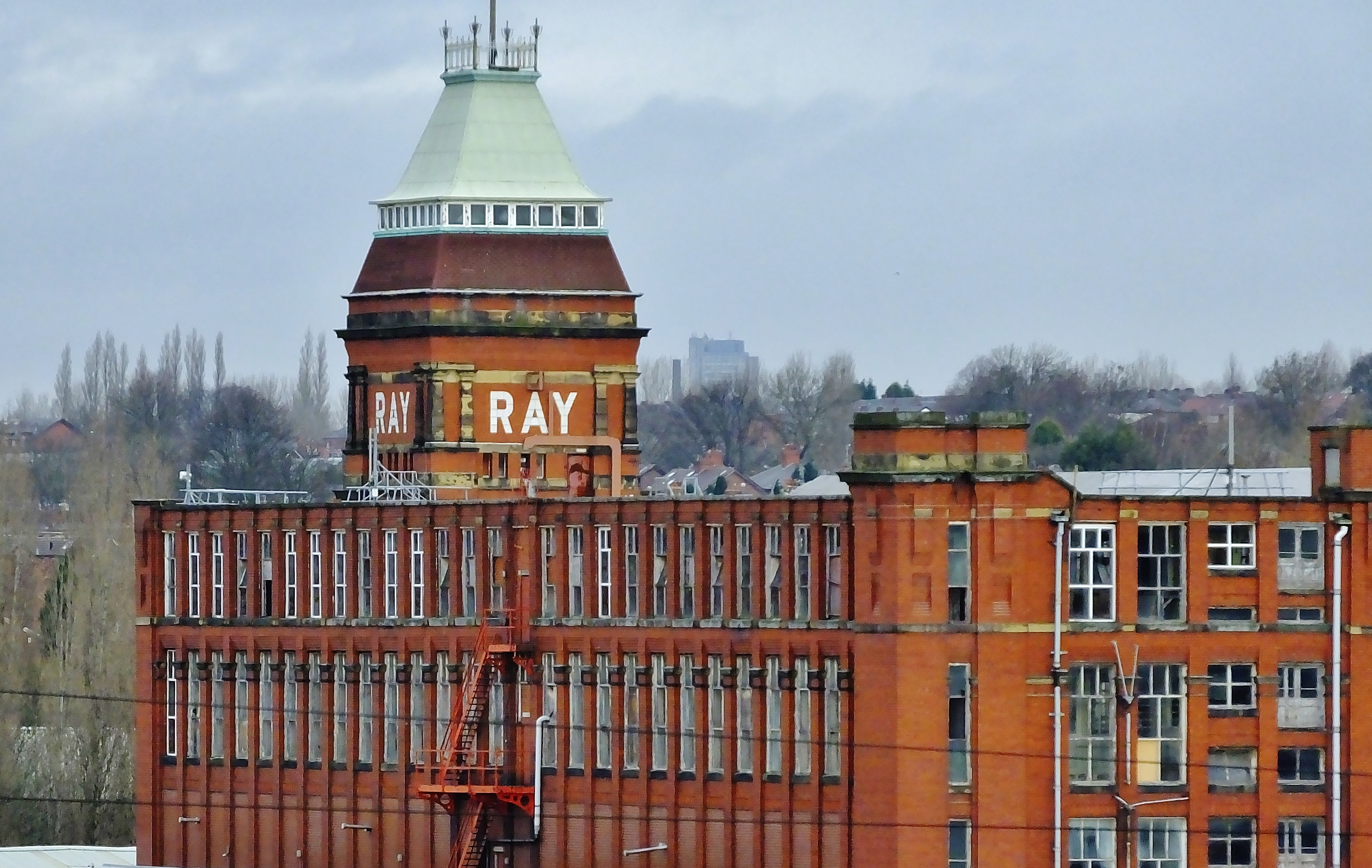
Ray Mill in 2016; a fine red brick building

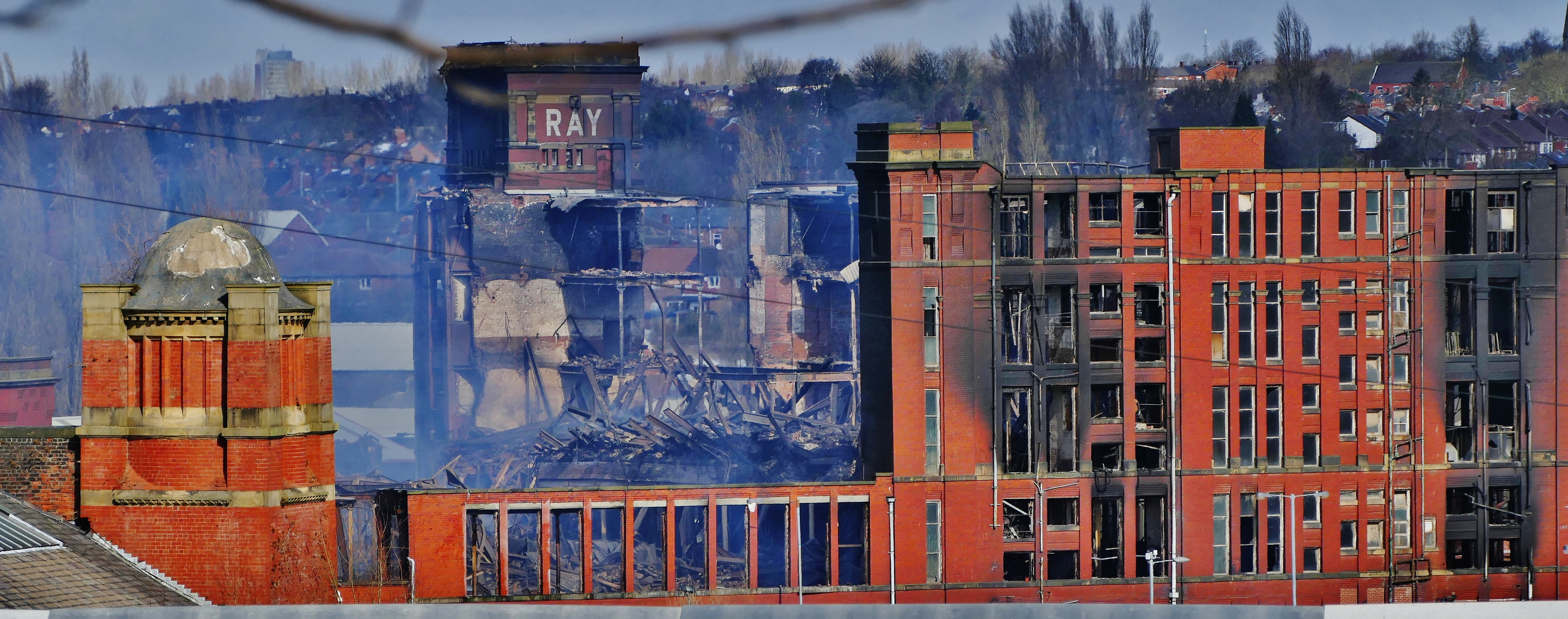
Ray Mill in 2018, after a devastating fire; it has since been demolished

The character of Stalybridge altered over the 20th century. At the turn of the century, the cotton industry was still strong and the population of the town reached its peak in 1901, at 27,623. As trade dwindled, the population began to decline and, despite the intensified employment of the war years, the main industry of Stalybridge continued to fail. There were floods in Millbrook in May 1906.

Ada Summers was the first woman mayor of Stalybridge to be elected in November 1919. At that time, mayors of boroughs were justices, as well as chairmen of borough benches, by right of office. However, it was not until the Sex Disqualification (Removal) Act 1919 came into force on 23 December 1919 that women could become magistrates. Sitting ex-officio, Summers became the first woman magistrate in the country and was sworn in on 31 December. Summers was, probably, the first woman to officially adjudicate in court. Her photo appeared in the weekly journal Great Thoughts, 5 June 1920, alongside an interview on "the first woman JP" on her work. She was the widow of a local ironmaster and an active suffragist and Liberal; she used her wealth and position to support a number of schemes designed to improve conditions in the town. These included a maternity and child welfare clinic, clinics for the sick and poor and an unofficial employment centre. She later became an alderman and was appointed MBE. On 31 May 1939, she was awarded the Honorary Freedom of the Borough.

In 1929, with no room for expansion at Stalybridge, the Summers sheet rolling and galvanising plants were transferred to Shotton in North Wales, having devastating effects on local employment; the new plant later became a component in the British Steel Corporation. By 1932, seven of the town's largest mills had closed and unemployment reached 7,000. In 1934, the borough council set up an Industrial Development Committee for the purpose of encouraging new industries to settle in the town. The committee purchased Cheetham's Mill and rented it out to small firms engaged in a wide variety of enterprises. By 1939, unemployment in the town had almost disappeared.

==== 1939–99 ====
Stalybridge experienced intensive black-out periods and frequent air-raid warning during the Second World War. Bombs dropped by enemy aircraft mainly landed in open country and there were no civilian casualties. On 19 July 1946, King George VI and Queen Elizabeth visited Stalybridge. The town's war memorial was extended after the war, to bear the names of an extra 124 men from the town; it was unveiled on 23 April 1950.

In the post-war period, council housing was provided by the local authority as separate council estates. The Buckton Vale estate was built between January 1950 and March 1953, and the Stamford Park estate between January 1953 and January 1955; the Copley estate commenced building in August 1954 and the Ridgehill estate in January 1956.

In 1955, after the adoption of the first post-war slum clearance plan, new housing estates were built to replace the slums and, gradually, redundant textile mills were occupied by firms in the various light industries. New applications of engineering principles, the manufacture of rubber goods, plastics, chemicals and packaging materials were all introduced, as well as the addition of synthetic fibres to the textile trade, reducing unemployment. The plastics industry origin and growth are described by Craig and Bowes in "Cotton Mills to Chemical Plants" (2013).

The early 1970s saw the development of private semi-detached and detached housing estates, particularly in the Mottram Rise, Hough Hill, Hollins and Carrbrook areas; the redevelopment of Castle Hall was also completed. The construction of the Buckton Vale overspill estate also took place in the early 1970s.

The early 1980s saw the closure of the public baths after the completion of Copley Recreation Centre. One of the symbols of the late-19th century civic improvement, the baths were subsequently demolished.

In 1991, for the first time since 1901, there was an increase in the population of Stalybridge to 22,295. The 1990s saw the proliferation of Mock Tudor style estates at Moorgate and along Huddersfield Road, close to Staley Hall; this continued into the 21st century with the completion of the Crowswood estate in Millbrook.

=== 21st century ===
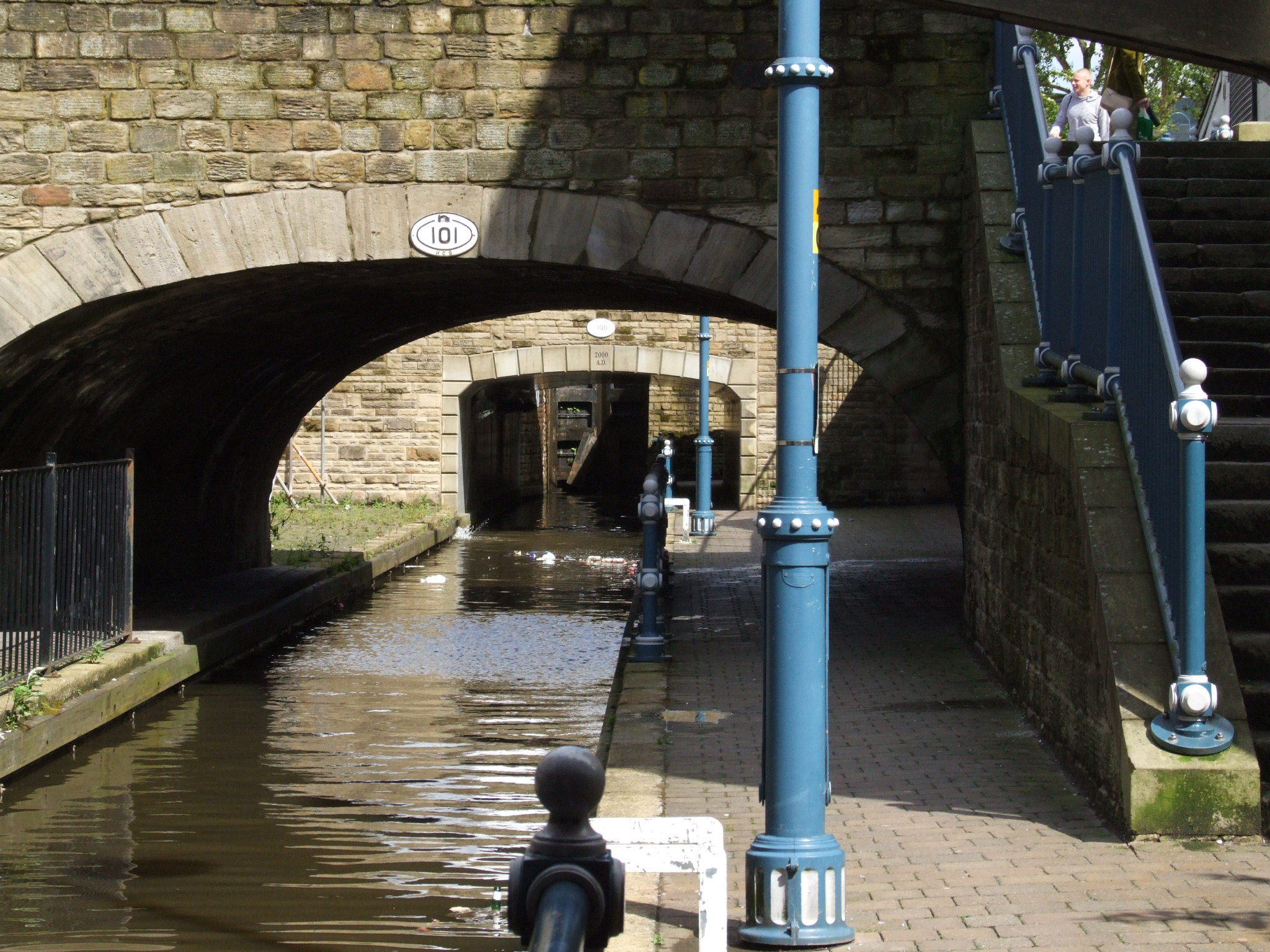
Huddersfield Narrow Canal

The Huddersfield Narrow Canal, which had been culverted in the early 1970s, was reinstated to the town centre between 1999 and May 2001, as part of a two-year multi-million pound refurbishment. The canal now runs under the legs of an electricity pylon.

The market hall closed on New Year's Eve 1999 and became the Civic Hall in 2001. Four years later, the area designated for retail space became exhibition space. There were plans to reopen the market and let the retail hall out to private contractors, though this came to naught.

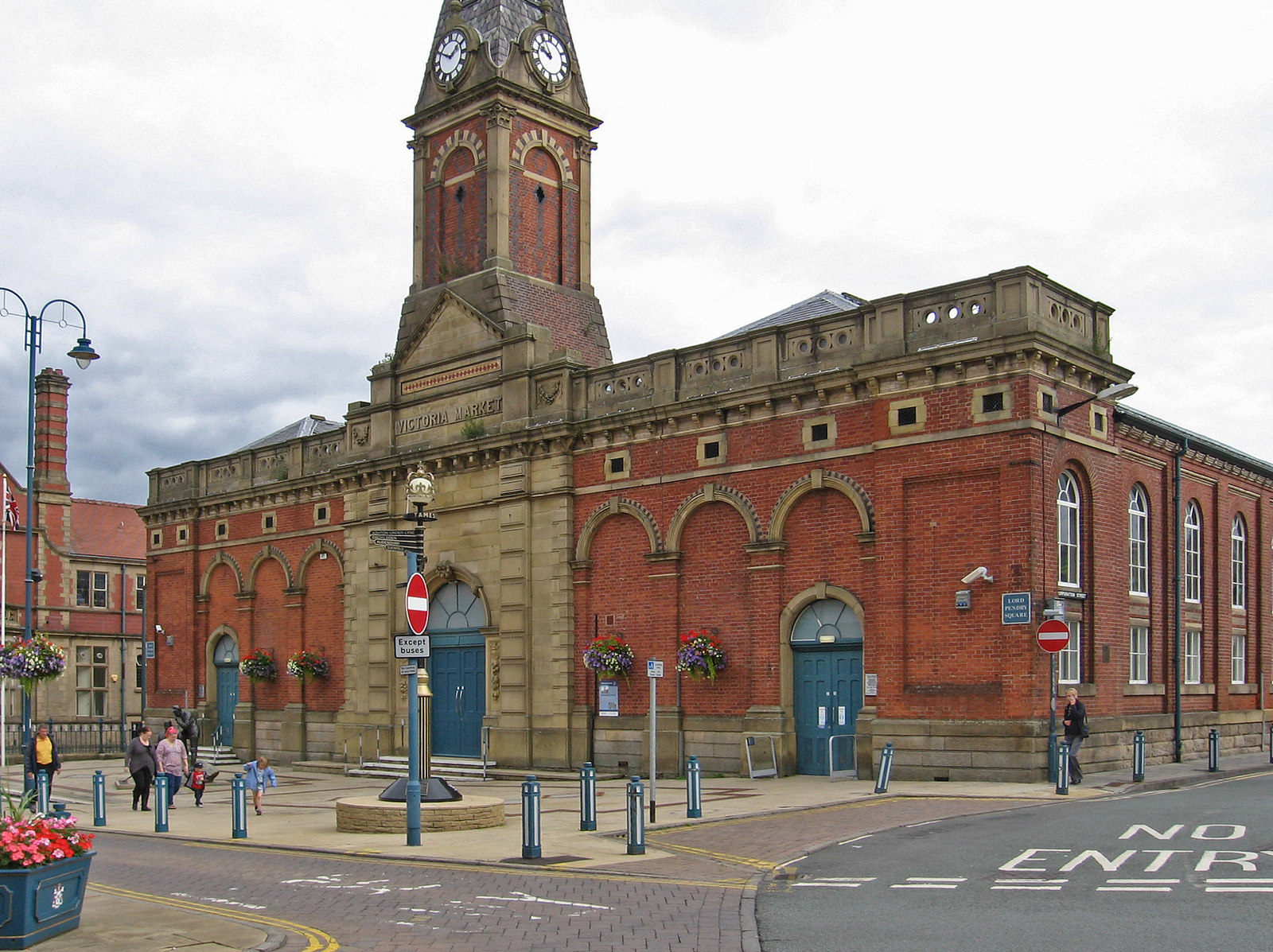
Market Hall

The town's cinema, the Palace, closed on 31 August 2003, with the last film being American Pie 3: The Wedding. The cinema has since been converted to become Rififi nightclub and Amber Lounge bar & restaurant, which itself was closed down late in 2012, after two violent incidents on the same night.

In 2004, Tameside Metropolitan Borough Council announced that it had granted permission for a developer to build 16 homes next to Staley Hall; a condition of the planning consent was that the hall be restored. By 2008, the hall was deteriorating and was listed as being in "very bad" condition on the English Heritage buildings at risk register. As of 2015, Staley Hall has been renovated and redeveloped into apartments.

Stalybridge suffered from Storm Angus on 21 November 2016, when 3 inches (7.6 cm) of rain fell on Tameside in five hours. Mottram Road and Huddersfield Road, Millbrook were flooded by water from a stream leading from the Walkerwood Reservoir.

In late June 2018, many properties in Stalybridge were threatened by a large wildfire advancing from Saddleworth Moor. Fifty properties in the Carrbrook area of Stalybridge were evacuated on 26 June as the wildfire advanced towards them.

In December 2023, during Storm Gerrit, a tornado caused damage in the Millbrook and Carrbrook areas of Stalybridge.

== Governance ==
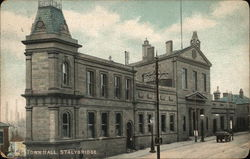
Stalybridge Town Hall was completed in 1831 and demolished in 1989, with the exception of the entrance.

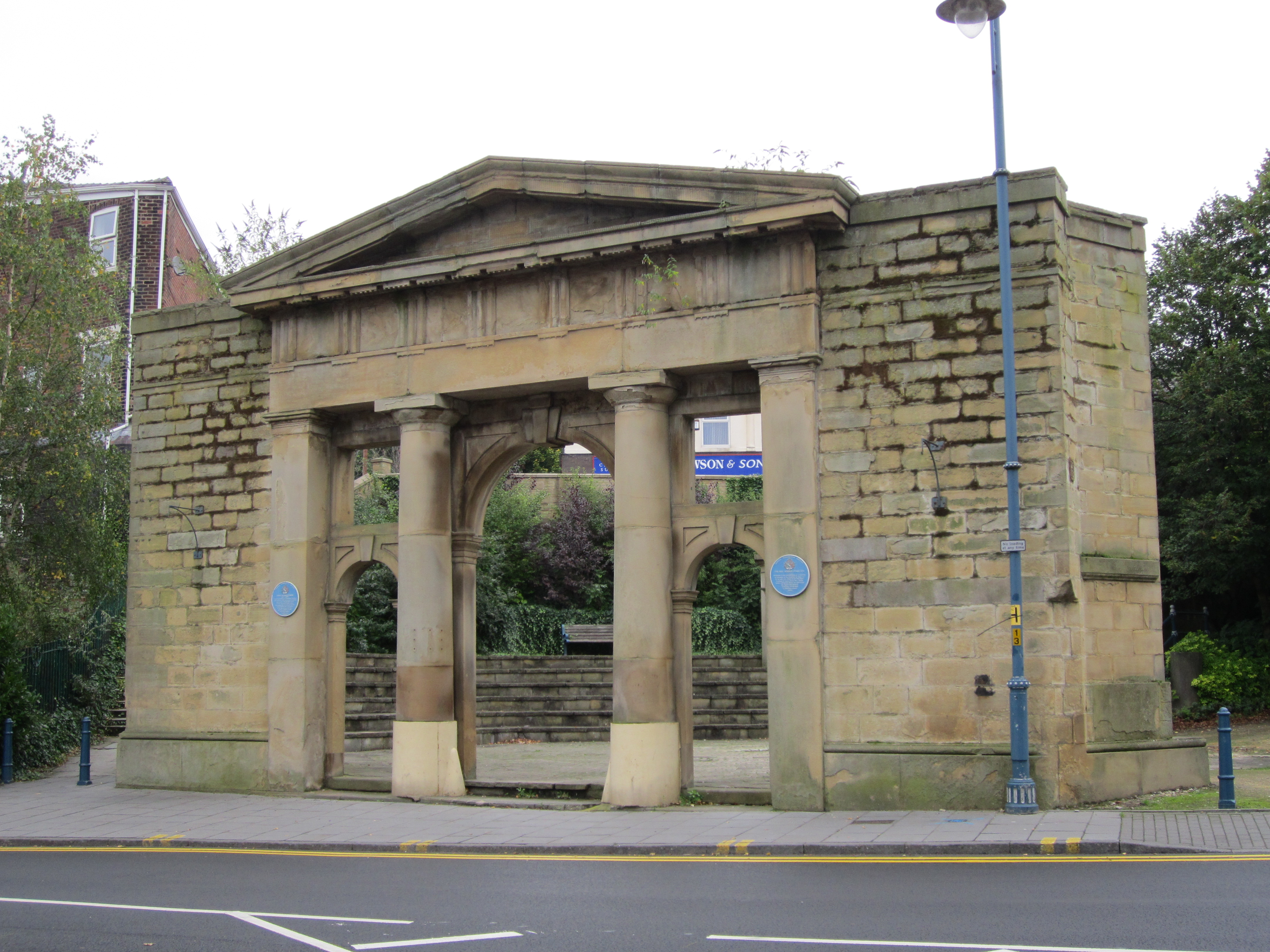
The remains of the town hall

There is one main tier of local government covering Stalybridge, at metropolitan borough level; this is Tameside Metropolitan Borough Council. The council is a member of the Greater Manchester Combined Authority, which is led by the directly-elected mayor of Greater Manchester.

=== Administrative history ===
As the town developed during the industrial revolution, it initially straddled two counties and three parishes: the township of Dukinfield in the parish of Stockport and the township of Stayley in the parish of Mottram in Longdendale in Cheshire, and the parish of Ashton-under-Lyne in Lancashire. Townships such as Dukinfield and Stayley were reclassified as civil parishes in 1866.

In 1828, a body of improvement commissioners was established to administer a newly defined Stalybridge district, which straddled the townships of Dukinfield, Stayley and Ashton-under-Lyne. In 1857, the commissioners' district was incorporated to become a municipal borough.

The town's municipal charter established a council comprising a mayor, six aldermen and 18 councillors. The borough was divided into three wards: Lancashire; Staley and Dukinfield. A list of burgesses was published on 21 April 1857 and the first election of councillors was held on 1 May 1857. The contesting parties were the "whites" and the "yellows". The council met for the first time on 9 May 1857 and elected the first six aldermen; the first mayor was William Bayley. The council took over the commissioners' functions in January 1858.

The new borough council was granted a coat of arms later in 1857. The arms incorporated features from the coats of arms of the Stayley, Assheton, Dukinfield and Astley families who had all been land owners in the town. The motto, absque labore nihil, means "nothing without labour".

The arms of the former Stalybridge Borough Council feature a golden wheatsheaf and a silver wolf, both representing Cheshire

Stayley township also included extensive areas outside the original borough boundaries of Stalybridge. The northern tip of Stayley township was included in the local government district of Mossley in 1864. In 1868, a separate Stayley local government district was created covering the parts of the township that were neither in the Mossley district nor the borough of Stalybridge, with Millbrook being the largest settlement in the Stayley district. The borough of Stalybridge was enlarged in 1881 to take in the area of the Stayley local government district, which was abolished, plus further parts of the parish of Ashton-under-Lyne, including Heyrod and Ridge Hill.

When elected county councils were established in 1889 under the Local Government Act 1888, boroughs such as Stalybridge which straddled county boundaries were placed entirely in the county which had the majority of the population. The part of Stalybridge north of the river Tame in Lancashire was therefore transferred to Cheshire. Parish boundaries were not changed by the 1889 county boundary alteration. In 1894, a new civil parish of Stalybridge was created which covered the same area as the borough. The borough was enlarged in 1936 to take in part of the abolished parish of Matley, formerly part of the Tintwistle Rural District.

In 1955, Stalybridge was twinned with Armentières, in France, due to a shared history in the textile industry.

The borough of Stalybridge was abolished in 1974, under the Local Government Act 1972. The area became part of the Metropolitan Borough of Tameside in Greater Manchester.

=== Parliamentary representation ===
The Stalybridge and Hyde constituency, within Greater Manchester

As a county palatine, Cheshire was unrepresented in Parliament until the Chester and Cheshire (Constituencies) Act 1542. From 1545, Cheshire was represented by two Knights of the Shire. On the passage of the Great Reform Act of 1832, the area of Stalybridge south of the Tame was included in the North Cheshire constituency.

Between the passing of the Second Reform Act in 1867, and the general election of 1918, the town was represented in its own right through the Stalybridge constituency.

Since the 1918 general election, the town has been represented in Parliament by the member for Stalybridge and Hyde; its current MP is Jonathan Reynolds, a former Tameside councillor.

== Geography ==
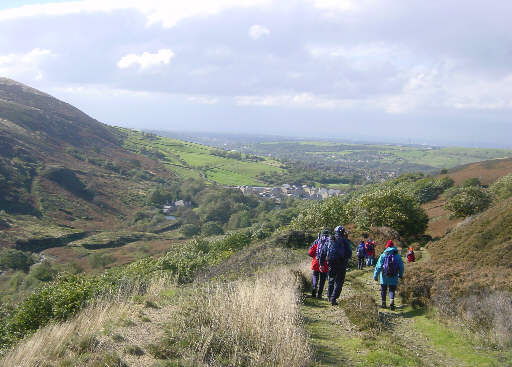
Carrbrook, from Buckton Vale

Stalybridge lies in the foothills of the Pennines, straddling the river Tame, which forms part of the ancient boundary between Lancashire and Cheshire, on the boundary of the Peak District national park. The highest point in the town is the summit of Wild Bank, at 1,309 feet (399 m). Harridge Pike is the second highest peak at 1,296 ft (395 m). Buckton Hill, the site of the mediaeval Buckton Castle, is another prominent landmark.

The town centre itself is situated along the banks of the river between Ridge Hill to the north and Hough Hill 801 ft (244 m) to the south. Stalybridge weather station is staffed by volunteers and has been providing statistics since 1999. The local bedrock is millstone grit, covered by a thin layer of soil over clay, with surface rock outcrops.

Over the course of the 20th century, the population of the town declined, particularly after the demolition of the mid-19th century high-density housing. At the 2001 census, Stalybridge had a population of 22,568. The town includes the localities of Heyheads, Buckton Vale, Carrbrook, Millbrook, Brushes Estate, Copley, Mottram Rise, Woodlands, Matley, Hough Hill, Castle Hall, Hollins Street, Hydes, Rassbottom, Waterloo, Cocker Hill, the Hague, Springs, Ridge Hill and Heyrod.

=== Environment ===
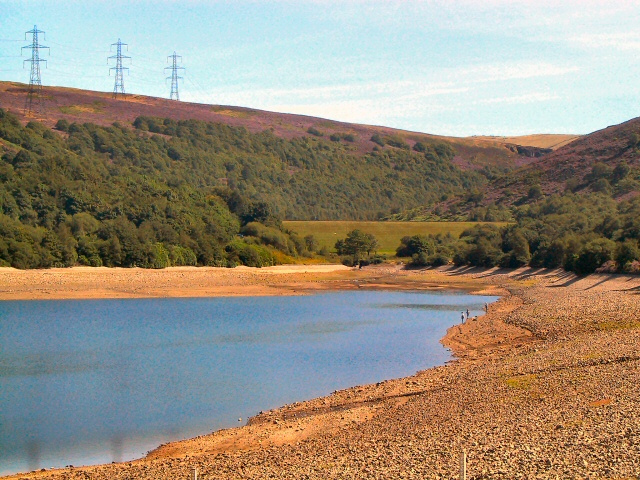
Walkerwood reservoir in the Brushes Valley

Much of the upland areas of the town are grouse moors. Boar Flat is part of the Dark Peak Site of Special Scientific Interest, as classified by Natural England. The slopes below the moors, particularly beneath Harridge Pike, are used for sheep grazing by the hill farms. The Stalybridge Country Park centres on two areas. Firstly, the Brushes Valley, with its four reservoirs running up into the Pennine Moors, and secondly Carrbrook, lying in the shadow of Buckton Castle.

Linking the two areas, although outside the country park boundaries, is a good rights of way network, and areas of designated access land which take visitors into the Tame Valley, Longdendale and the Peak District. The country park affords views of the Cheshire Plain, Jodrell Bank and, on very clear days, the mountains of Snowdonia. Buckton Castle and Stalybridge cairn, a round cairn, west of Hollingworthhall Moor are both scheduled monuments.

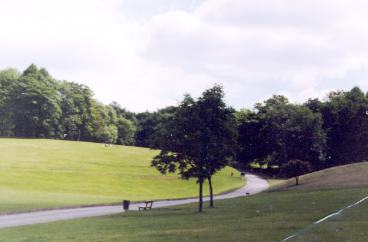
Cheetham Park

The town's two parks are the main open spaces in the town centre:

- Cheetham Park was opened in June 1932 to a crowd of 15,000 people; it was left to the town under the will of John Frederick Cheetham along with his house, Eastwood, and his collection of paintings, which now form part of the Astley Cheetham Art Gallery collection. The park is landscaped informally with large areas of woodland.
- Eastwood Nature Reserve. Eastwood was one of the first reserves to be owned by the RSPB. It is managed by Cheshire Wildlife Trust.

The reserve is a cut-over, lowland, raised mire Site of Special Scientific Interest, surrounded by a woodland fringe. Characteristic bog plants include sphagnum mosses, cotton grass and cross-leaved heath. Nine species of dragonfly and damselfly have been recorded on the reserve, along with the green hairstreak butterfly. The steep-sided broad-leaved woodland is bisected by Acres Brook and contains several old mill ponds. The geology is shale and sandstone, with a rich variety of plants and animals typical of woodland habitat on an acidic soil. Access is from the A6018 Mottram Road. The reserve occupies 4.7 ha (12 acres).

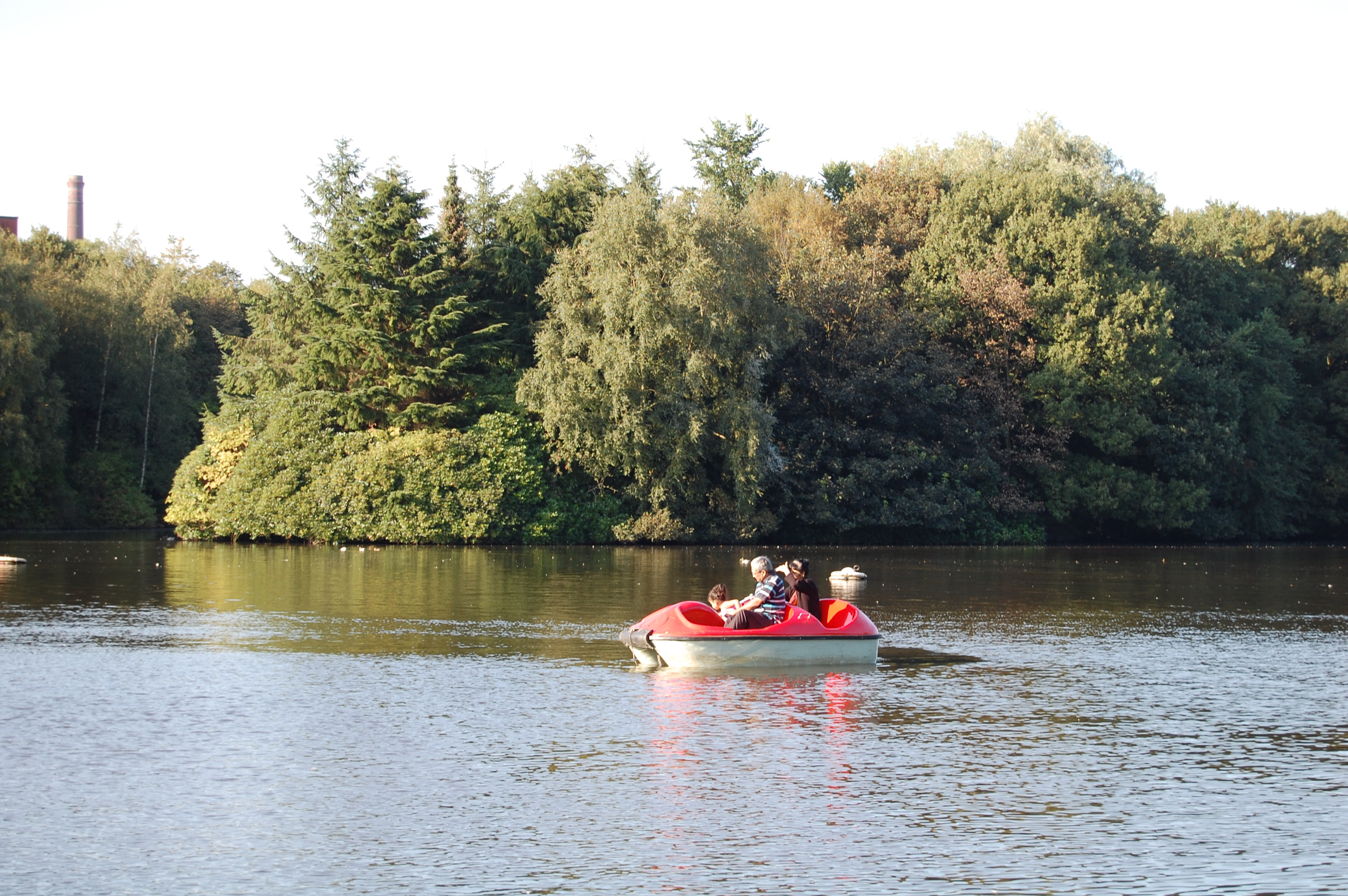
The boating lake at Stamford Park

Stamford Park is registered by English Heritage as being of special interest. In 1865, local mill owner Abel Harrison died and his home, Highfield House, and its extensive grounds, on the border with Ashton were bought by the two towns. Neighbouring land was donated by George Harry Grey, 7th Earl of Stamford and 3rd Earl of Warrington. The whole area was landscaped to become Stamford Park and opened by the Earl on 12 July 1873. The former mill reservoir, known as Chadwick Dams, was incorporated into the park in 1891. The reservoir was divided in two by an embankment, with the southern section becoming the present boating lake. This area includes waterfalls cascading over rock faces and gargoyles built into the bridges and walls. The park has tennis courts, bowling greens, a children's playground, The park is the venue for the annual Tulip Sunday Festival.

=== Demography ===
Stalybridge ethnicity compared
2001 UK census	Stalybridge	Tameside	England
Total population	22,568	213,043	49,138,831
White	97.1%	91.2%	91%
Asian	1.9%	5.6%	4.6%
Black	0.1%	1.2%	2.3%

According to the Office for National Statistics, at the time of the 2001 census, Stalybridge had a population of 22,568. The 2001 population density was 4,451/km^{2} (11,530/sq mi), with a 100 to 95.0 female-to-male ratio. Of those over 16 years old, 29.2% were single (never married) and 41.6% married. Stalybridge's 9,331 households included 29.1% inhabited by one-person, 38.3% married couples living together, 9.7% were co-habiting couples and 12.0% were single parents with their children. Of those aged 16–74, 31.7% had no academic qualifications, below the average for Tameside (35.2%) but slightly higher than England (28.9%).

==== Population change ====
Population change in Stalybridge since 1823
Year	1823	1825	1901	1911	1921	1931	1939	1951	1961	1971	1991	2001	2011
Population	5,500	9,000	27,673	26,513	25,213	24,831	22,299	22,541	21,947	22,799	22,921	22,568	23,731

== Education ==
Former school on Waterloo Road

Before 1910, primary education was provided by the church schools. In 1910, the borough opened its own school on Waterloo Road. In 1927, West Hill School, a central school for boys was opened; the central school for girls opened in 1930. Until 1980, secondary modern education was provided by schools in the town itself; with selective education by Hyde Grammar School. For Roman Catholic pupils, grammar school education was provided by Harrytown, in Bredbury, and Xaverian, in Rusholme. Catholic secondary modern education was available from 1963 at St Peter and St Paul, Dukinfield.

In 1977, the local education authority appealed to keep its grammar schools rather than be forced by the government to adopt a comprehensive system. The Lord of Appeal, Lord Lane, was personally critical of Fred Mulley, the Secretary of State for Education and Science for being "far from frank" about his reason for intervening in Tameside and joined in the judgement which found for Tameside and brought a halt to comprehensivisation. However, following the election of a Labour council in 1980, the local grammar schools were abolished and all the secondary modern and grammar schools in Stalybridge, Hyde and Dukinfield became comprehensives.

The primary schools in the town are:

- Stalyhill Junior School
- Gorse Hall Primary School
- Arlies Primary School
- Silver Springs Primary Academy (formerly Ridge Hill)
- Wild Bank Community School
- St Peter's RC Primary School and Nursery Voluntary Aided by the Diocese of Shrewsbury
- St Paul's C of E Primary School Voluntary Aided by the Diocese of Chester
- St Raphael's RC Primary School Voluntary Aided by the Diocese of Shrewsbury
- Buckton Vale Primary School
- Millbrook Primary School
- Trinity Christian School (Christian independent school).

Secondary schools in the town are:

- Copley Academy (formerly Copley High School) 11–16 comprehensive co-educational
- West Hill School 11–16 comprehensive boys' school
- All Saints' Catholic College 11–18 comprehensive co-educational; voluntary aided by the Diocese of Shrewsbury. Located in Dukinfield and serves residents of Stalybridge, Hyde and Dukinfield.
- Trinity Christian School (Christian independent school).

== Transport ==
=== Roads ===
The nearest point of access to the motorway network is approximately 1 mile (1.6 km) from the southern boundary of the town at junction four of the M67; this is a feeder to the M60 Manchester orbital motorway and the city of Sheffield.

The A635 A road passes through the town and the A6018 commences at Stalybridge. The B6175 and B6176 Huddersfield Road also pass through the town.

=== Railway ===
Stalybridge railway station lies on the Huddersfield line, the former London & North Western Railway route between Manchester, Huddersfield and Leeds. Services are operated by two train operating companies:

- TransPennine Express operates inter-city services to Liverpool Lime Street, Manchester Piccadilly, Manchester Victoria, Huddersfield, Leeds, York and Newcastle
- Northern Trains operates regular services to Southport, via Ashton-under-Lyne and Manchester Victoria; a parliamentary service operates to Stockport via the Stockport to Stalybridge Line on Saturday mornings, to avoid closing the intermediate stations at Reddish South and Denton.

=== Buses ===
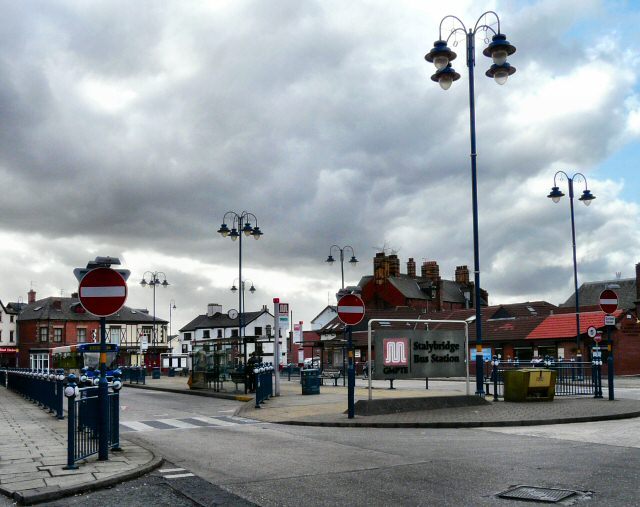
Stalybridge bus station

Stalybridge bus station is operated by Transport for Greater Manchester. The majority of services that serve the area are operated by Metroline Manchester, under the Bee Network branding; other operators include Stagecoach Manchester and Diamond North West. Routes connnect with town with Ashton, Glossop, Hyde, Manchester, Oldham and Saddleworth.

=== Trams ===
A tram network, operated by the SHMD Joint Board, ran lines through Stalybridge from 1904 to 1945, until their replacement by buses.

The second-generation tramway, Manchester Metrolink, can be taken at nearby Ashton for connections to the city centre.

=== Canals ===
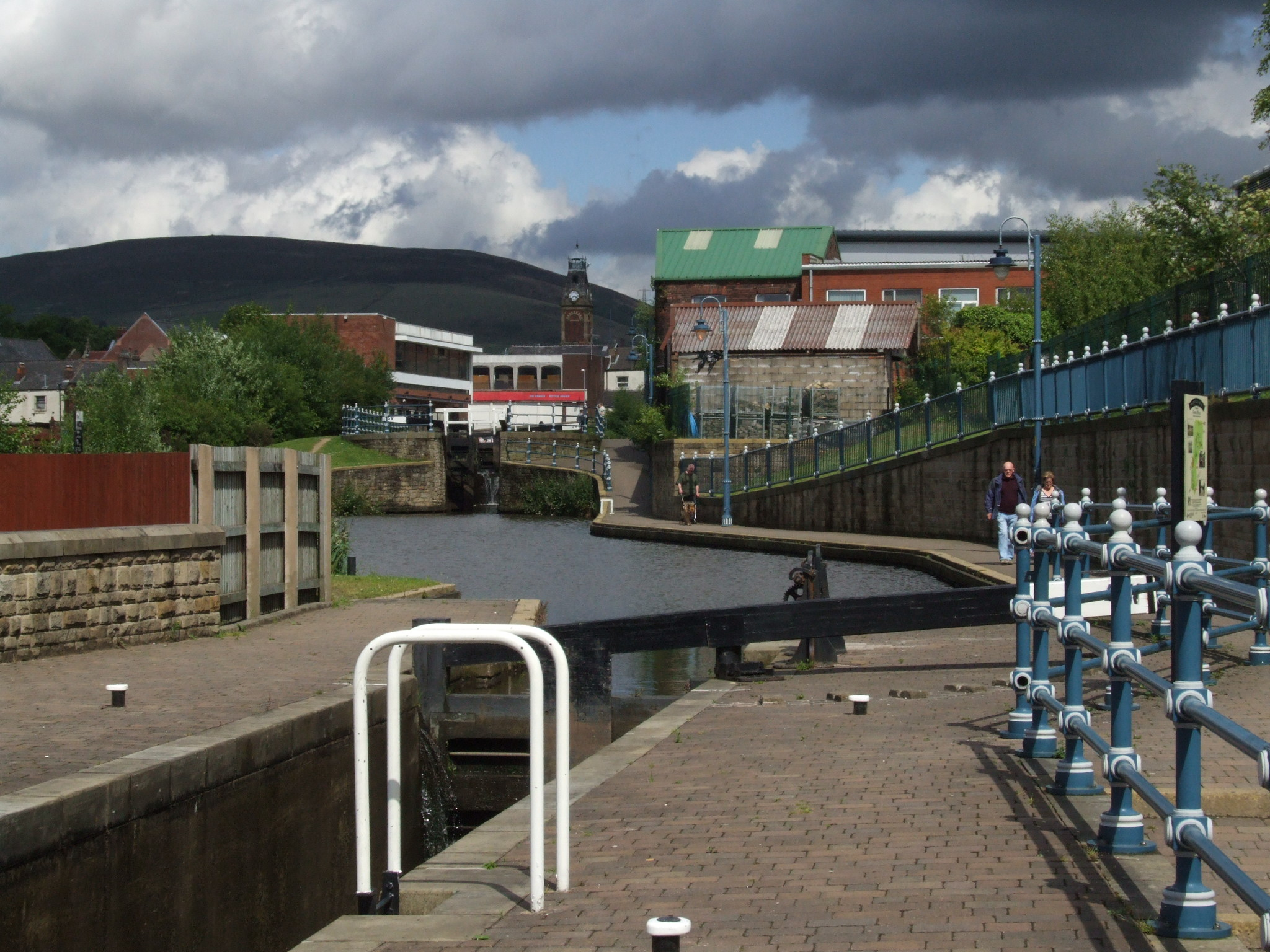
The Huddersfield Narrow Canal, towards the market hall from lock 4W

Huddersfield Narrow Canal passes through the town, forming part of the South Pennine Ring. It runs from the junction with the Huddersfield Broad Canal near Aspley Basin, in Huddersfield, to the junction with the Ashton Canal at Whitefields Basin. The canal was completed in 1811, but was closed to navigation in 1951. It was reopened in 2001 and is now managed by the Canal and River Trust.

== Public services ==
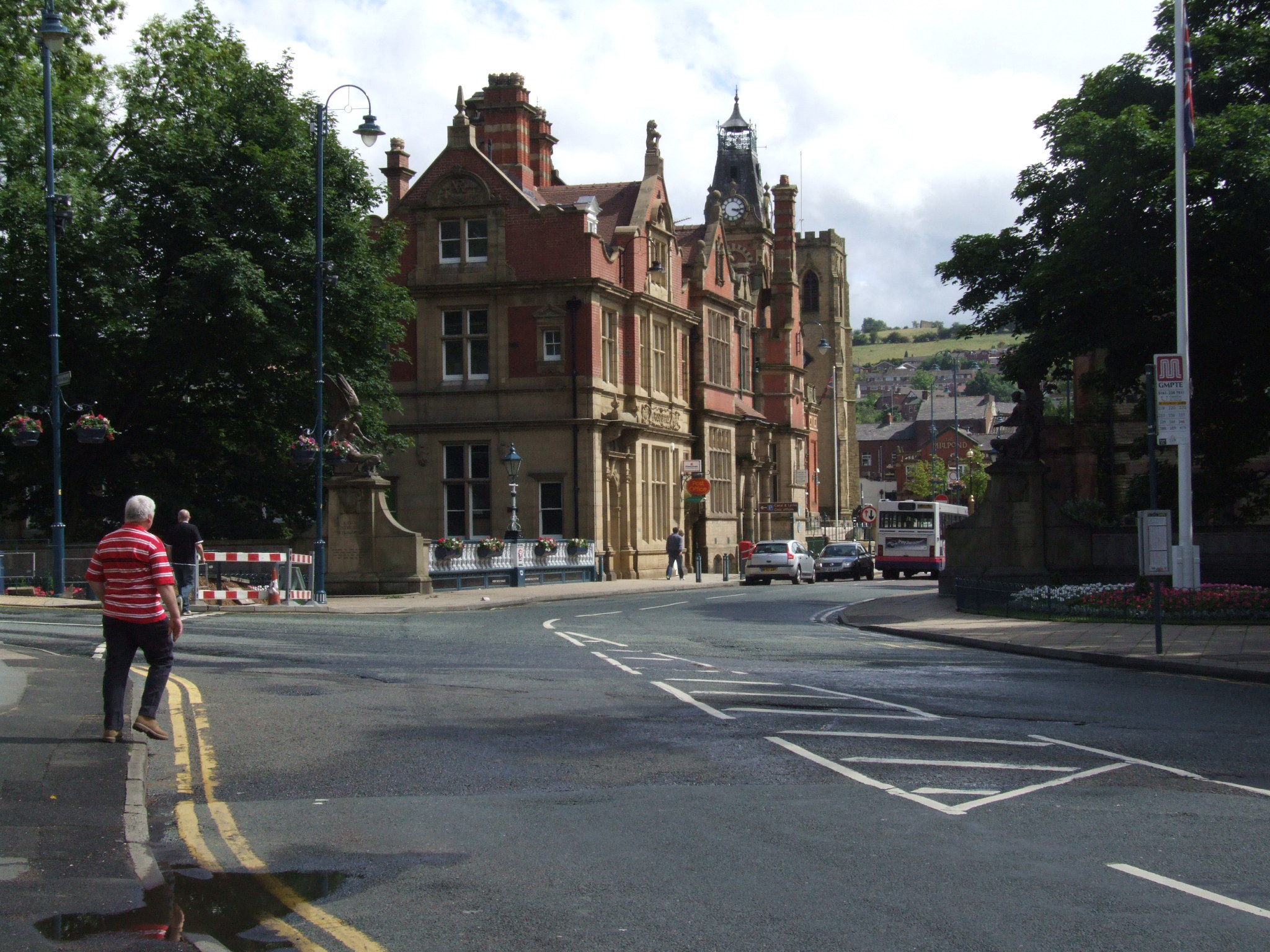
The post office

Stalybridge post office is located on Trinity Street; sub-post offices are Ridge Hill and Carrbrook.

The police station was located on Corporation Street, but has since been converted into flats, with police services being provided by Ashton-Under-Lyne's station and the wider Greater Manchester Police service.

The fire station is sited on Rassbottom Street.

== Religion ==
Until the 18th century, the Manor of Staley formed part of the parish of St Michael and All Angels, Mottram. The first church to be built in Stalybridge was Old St George's Church, Cocker Hill which was consecrated by the Bishop of Chester on 25 July 1776. The church collapsed on 15 May 1778.

After the Industrial Revolution, the rising population and the settlement of people from various parts of the country meant that Stalybridge became a centre for a wide range of denominations and sects. The history of these churches in the town is complex, with some churches having occupied many different sites. The influence of the churches in the town remained strong well into the 20th century and formed part of the basis of Stalybridge's sense of identity.

The first Methodist chapel was erected in 1802 on the corner of Chapel Street and Rassbottom Street. The Baptist chapel on King Street, was opened by the Particular (Ebenezer) Baptists. This chapel was subsequently occupied by the Congregational Church on 3 October 1830. The Particular (Ebenezer) Baptists moved to a new chapel on Cross Leech Street on 28 October 1828.

=== Churches ===
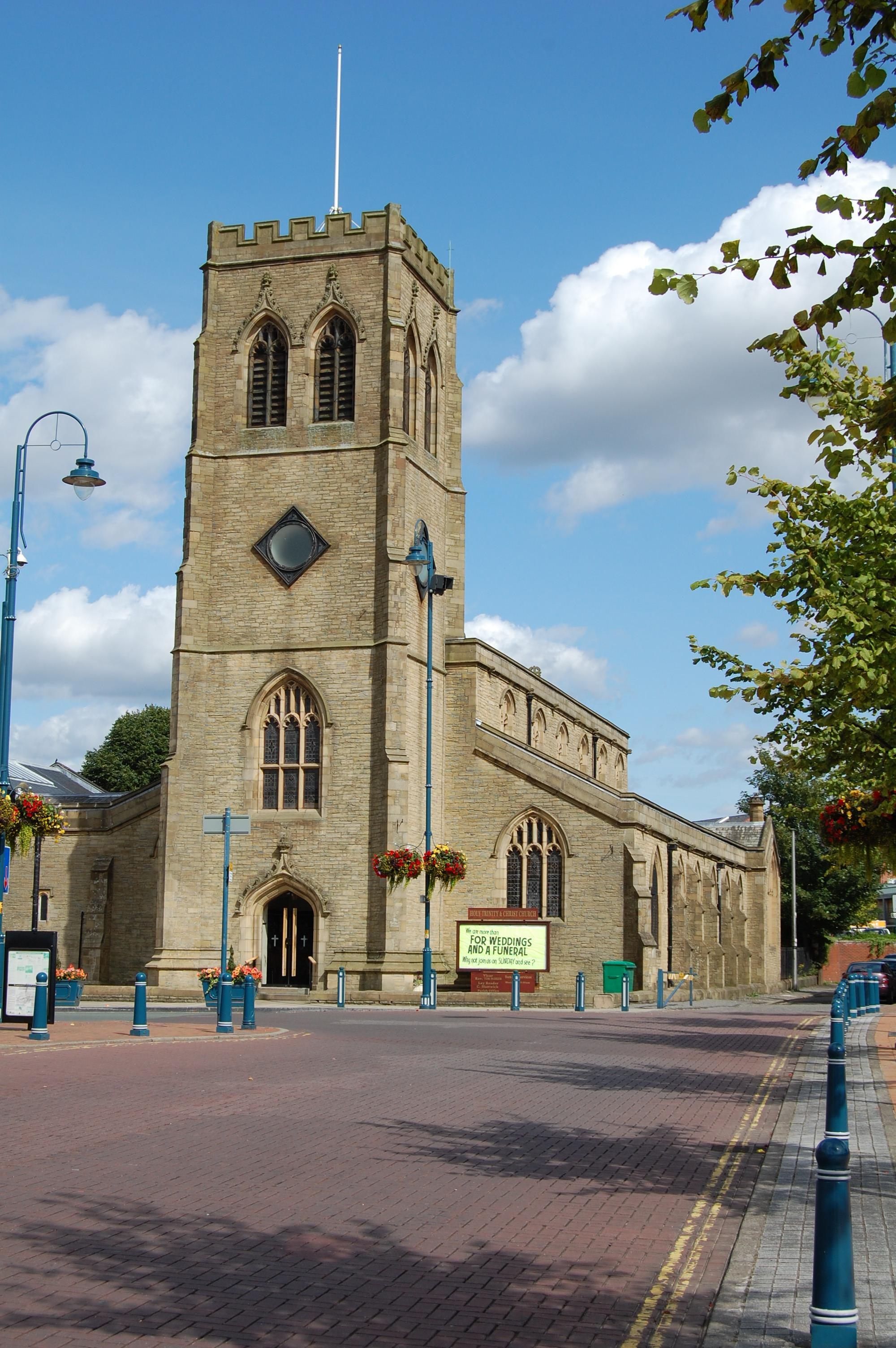
Holy Trinity and Christ Church

St George's is the parish church on the Lancashire side of the river in the Diocese of Manchester. It is known as New St George's and its foundation stone was laid on 24 June 1840. On the Cheshire side, the parish church of Holy Trinity and Christ Church, Diocese of Chester, is on Trinity Street in the town centre, beside the former market hall. The foundation stone of the parish church of St Paul's, Staley, was laid by Stapleton Stapleton-Cotton, 1st Viscount Combermere on 2 February 1838. It is in the Diocese of Chester, as is St James', Millbrook. St Paul's Church is on Huddersfield Road and is an active parish church.

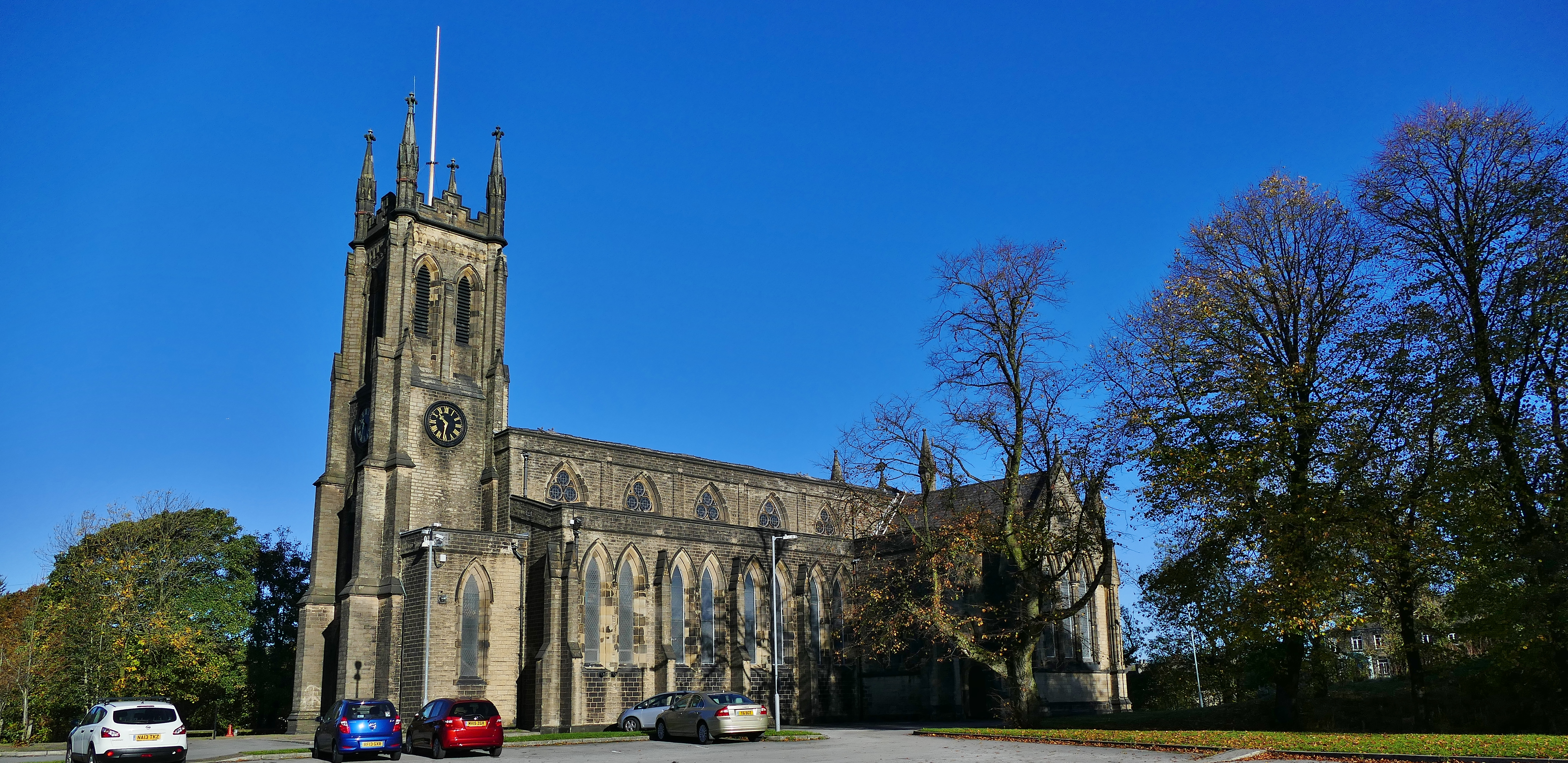
St Paul's Church

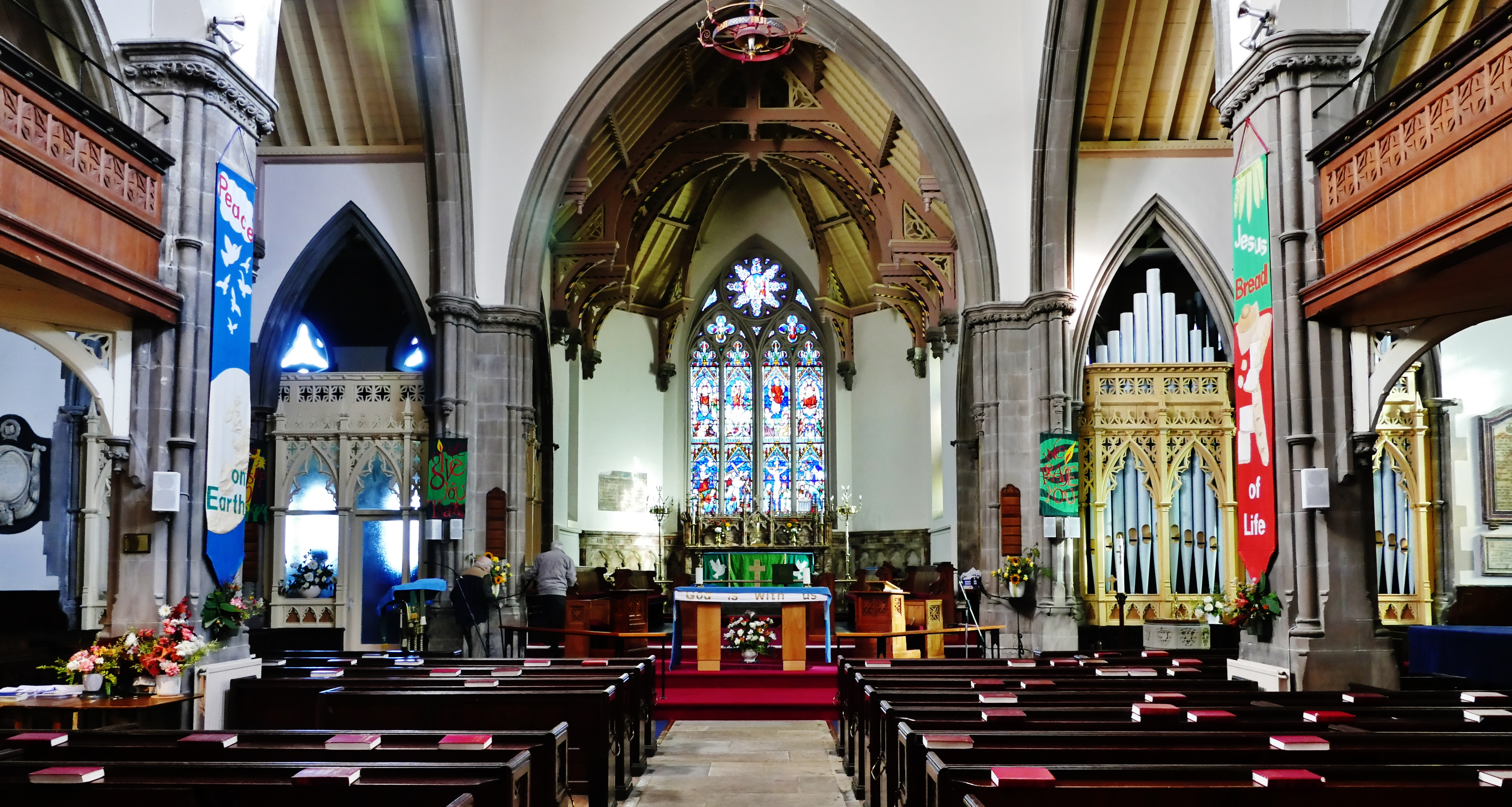
Interior of St Paul's Church

There are two Roman Catholic parishes: St Peter's,, the foundation stone of which was laid on 8 June 1838, and St Raphael's, Millbrook. In 2011, an estimated repair bill of £250,000 led to a decision to close St Raphael's; a final Mass was held on 14 July 2011 and, although it was Grade II listed in 2011, its future is now "uncertain". Both parishes are in the Diocese of Shrewsbury.

The octagonal Stalybridge Methodist Church on High Street opened in 1966.

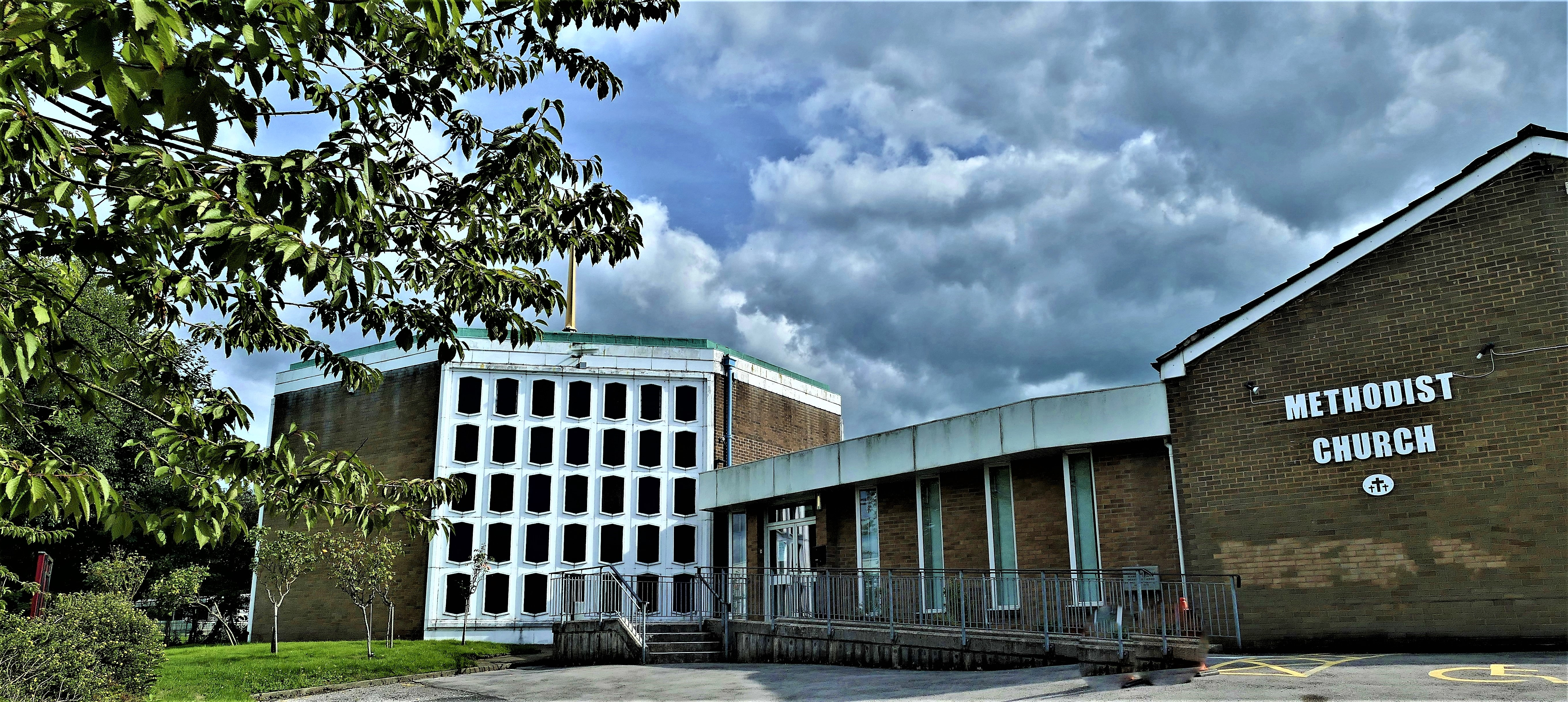
Stalybridge Methodist Church

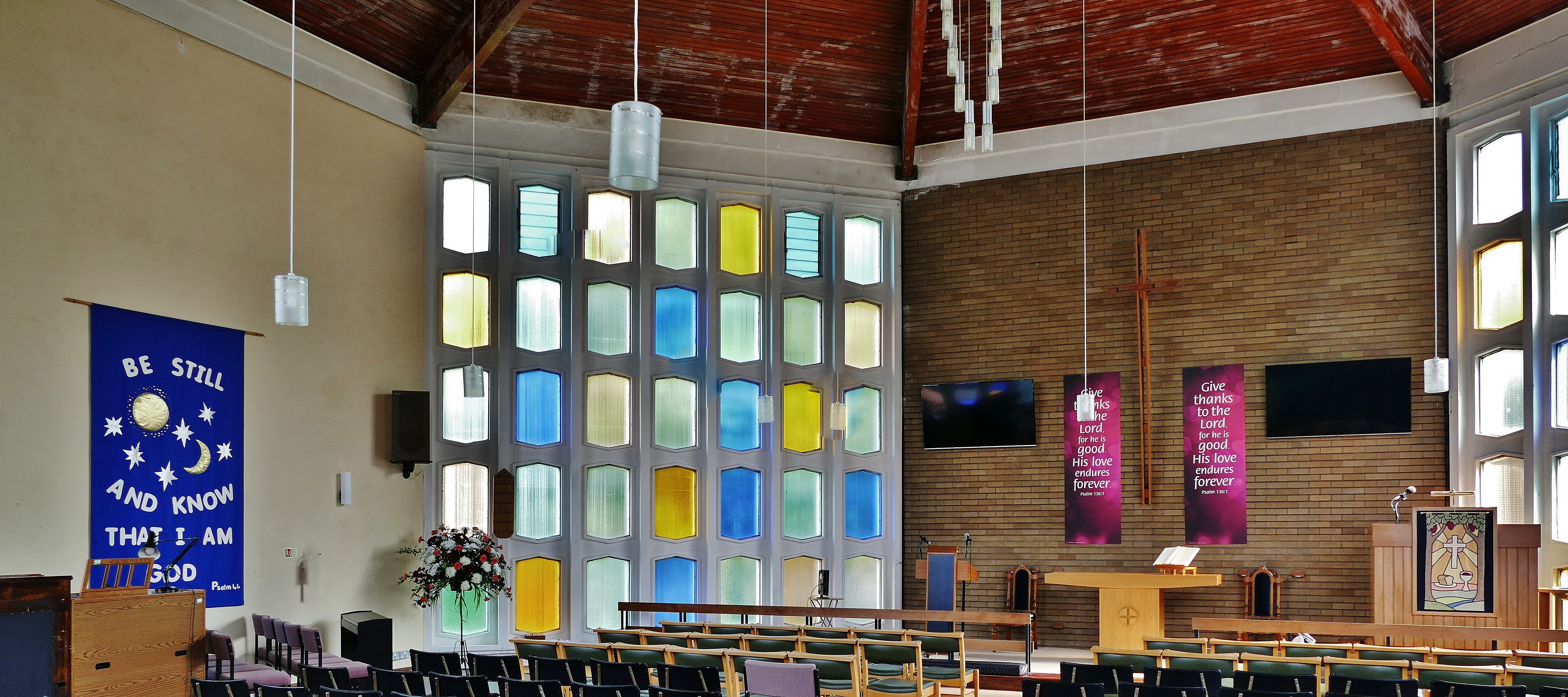
Stalybridge Methodist Church interior

Stalybridge Congregational Church is to be found in a modern building on Baker Street, just off Acres Lane, behind the Organ public house. Its original building, which opened for worship in 1861 and was demolished around the turn of the 21st century, was between Melbourne Street and Trinity Street in the town centre.

The Unitarian Church on Forester Drive was established in 1870 and is part of the East Cheshire Union of Unitarian and Free Christian Churches.

Stalybridge Revival Church, on Mount Street, formerly known as Stalybridge Evangelical Church, was established in 2009. The church has since moved to Millbrook, but retains use of the building on Mount Street.

== Culture ==
=== Music ===
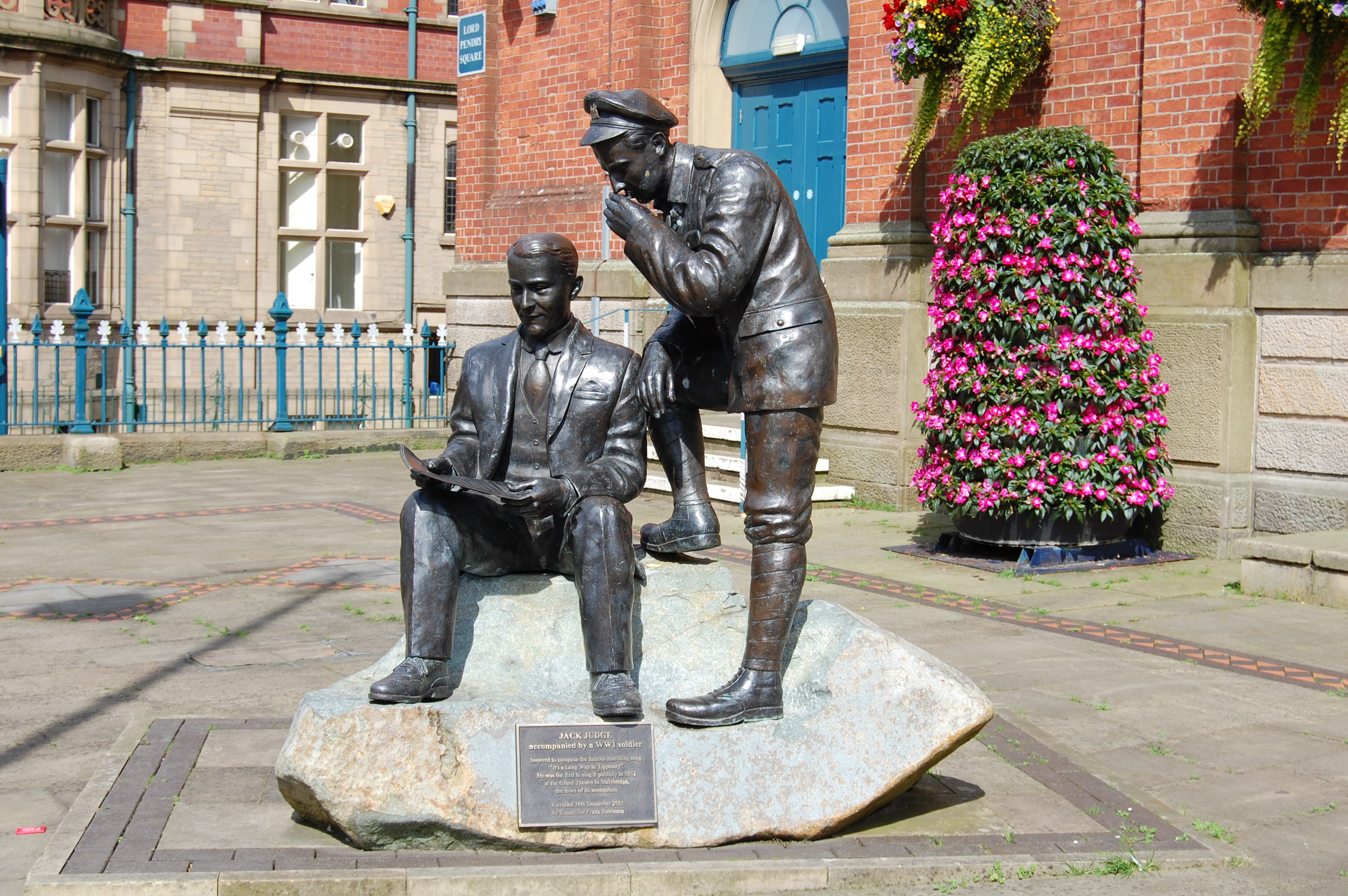
The Jack Judge memorial outside the Old Victoria Market Hall

The song It's a Long Way to Tipperary was created in the Newmarket Tavern, by the composer Jack Judge in 1912, after being challenged to write, compose and produce a song in just one night. It was first sung in public by him in the Grand Theatre on Corporation Street on 31 January 1912. On 31 January 1953, a memorial tablet was unveiled by Jack Hylton on the wall of the old Newmarket Tavern, where the song was composed. To coincide with the ceremony a wreath was laid on Jack Judge's grave, by the mayor of Oldbury. Jack Judge is now also commemorated by a statue in Lord Pendry Square outside the Old Victoria Market Hall.

Stalybridge Old Band was formed in 1809, perhaps the first civilian brass band in the world. The band currently contests in the second section. Carrbrook Brass currently contests in the fourth section and represent the town annually at the Armentières festival. An annual brass band contest has been held in the town on Whit Friday, since at least 1870. Other contests have been held on the same day in the surrounding villages of Millbrook, Carrbrook and Heyrod. There is now an established tradition of holding brass band contests on this day around Stalybridge, Mossley and Saddleworth. Bands travel by coach from all over the United Kingdom, and sometimes from other countries, to contest in as many different locations as possible on the day.

More recently, a live folk music tradition has developed in the town: the Buffet Bar Folk Club meets weekly and the Free & Easy Folk Club meet at the White House public house. Some members of the Fivepenny Piece, who sang traditional North Country music in the 1970s, were from the town; they performed songs such as "Stalybridge Station" and "Stalybridge Market".

=== Art ===
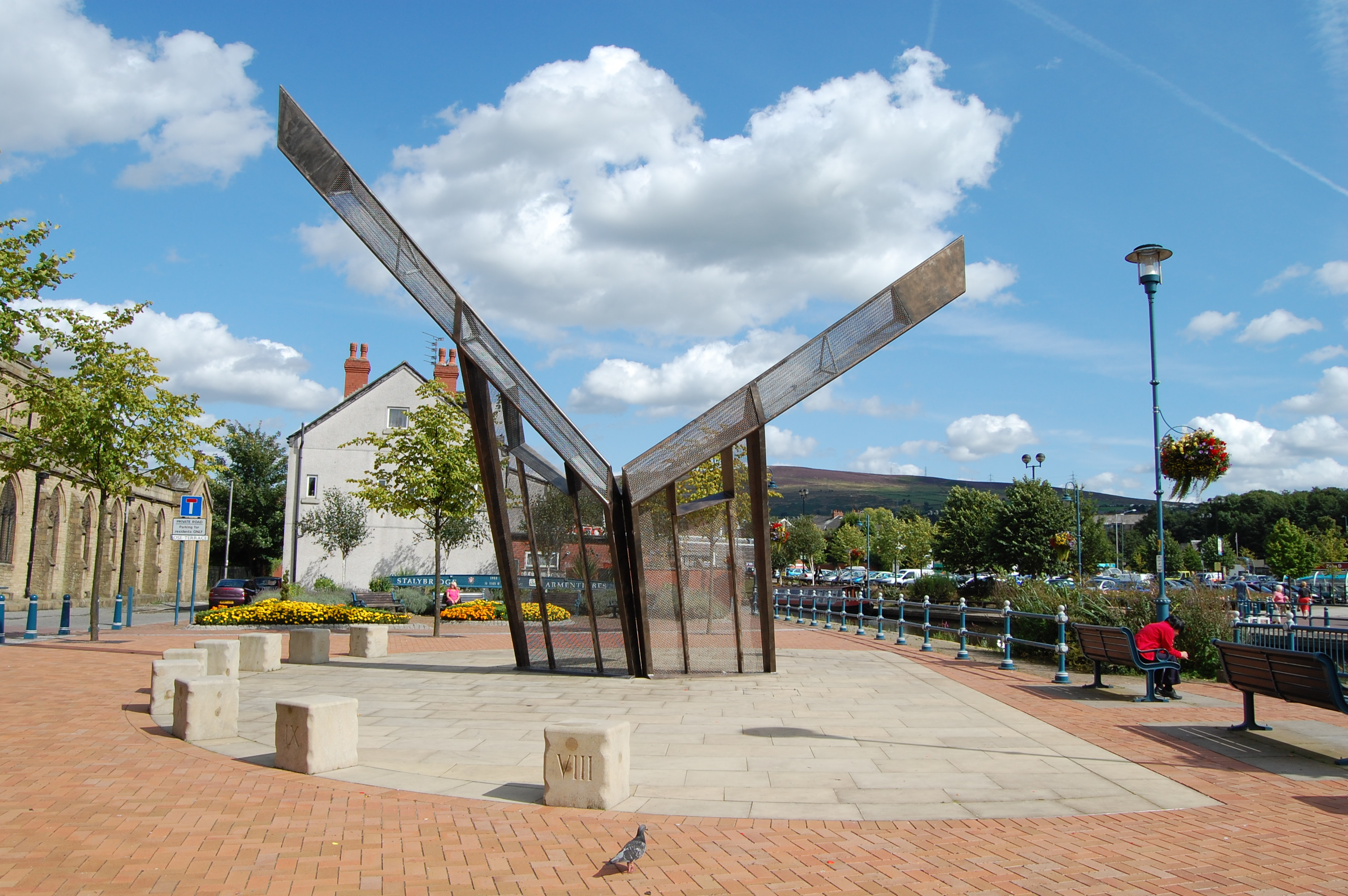
The Sundial

Built as a gift to the town of Stalybridge by John Frederick Cheetham and his wife Beatrice Astley, the Astley Cheetham Art Gallery originally opened to the public as a lecture theatre on 14 January 1901. The space was turned into a gallery to house the Astley Cheetham Collection, bequeathed in 1932. This collection has grown with gifts and donations throughout the 20th century and is one of the most interesting small regional collections of 15th century Italian paintings. The collection of work by Italian old masters includes 'Portrait of a Young Man' by Alessandro Allori. Also, British art of the 19th and 20th centuries is represented by artists such as John Linnell, Richard Parkes Bonington, George Price Boyce, Burne-Jones, Mark Gertler and Duncan Grant. Aske Hall by J.M.W. Turner is also part of the gallery's collection. Alongside exhibitions of the collection, it also hosts a programme of temporary exhibitions by regional artists.

During the earlier part of the 20th century, Stalybridge was artistically captured by the painter L. S. Lowry. Some of his paintings were of the people of Stalybridge. Lowry continued painting pictures until his death in 1976. His house is marked with a blue plaque on Stalybridge Road, Mottram in Longdendale. There is also a statue of him, holding his sketch pad, on a bench near the Stalybridge Road bus stop. Sheila Vaughan is a Stalybridge artist working in oils and acrylic. Her work and that of other Stalybridge artists such as Keith Taylor are displayed at the People's Gallery on Melbourne Street.

The Lock Gates Sundial is a large piece of public art alongside the canal in Armentieres Square. It commemorates the reopening of the canal and was installed in 2008. The north facing balance beam forms the gnomon of the sundial and heel stones mark the time.

=== Literature ===
As well as being described by Engels, Stalybridge was featured in Benjamin Disraeli's Coningsby. The children's author, Beatrix Potter, visited Gorse Hall many times as a child as it was the home of her maternal grandmother. Samuel Laycock (1826–93) was a librarian at the Mechanics' Institute for two years. His poetry presents a vivid impression of the mid-19th century, working-class life; he drew on his personal experience in the cotton industry. His best-loved poems are "Bowton's Yard" and "Bonny Brid", both written in Stalybridge.

Tim Willocks, author of Bad City Blues, Green River Rising and Bloodstained Kings is from Stalybridge.

M. John Harrison describes Stalybridge in his short story "The Ice Monkey" as a place "where nothing is clear-cut and there is neither town nor country, just a grim industrial muddle of the two".

=== Traditions ===
Whit Friday is the name given to the first Friday after Whitsun in areas of north-east Cheshire, south-east Lancashire and the western fringes of Yorkshire. The day has a cultural significance in Stalybridge as the date on which the annual Whit walks were traditionally held. It is also the day on which the traditional annual Whit Friday brass band contests are held.

The wakes were originally religious festivals that commemorated church dedications. Particularly important was the Rushcart festival associated with Rogationtide. During the Industrial Revolution the tradition of the wakes was adapted into a regular summer break in the mill towns of Lancashire, where each locality would nominate a wakes week during which the cotton mills would all close at the same time. Stalybridge Wakes occurs in the third week of July. Wakes Week became the focus for fairs, and eventually for holidays, where the mill workers would go to the seaside on the newly-developing railways.

=== Food and drink ===
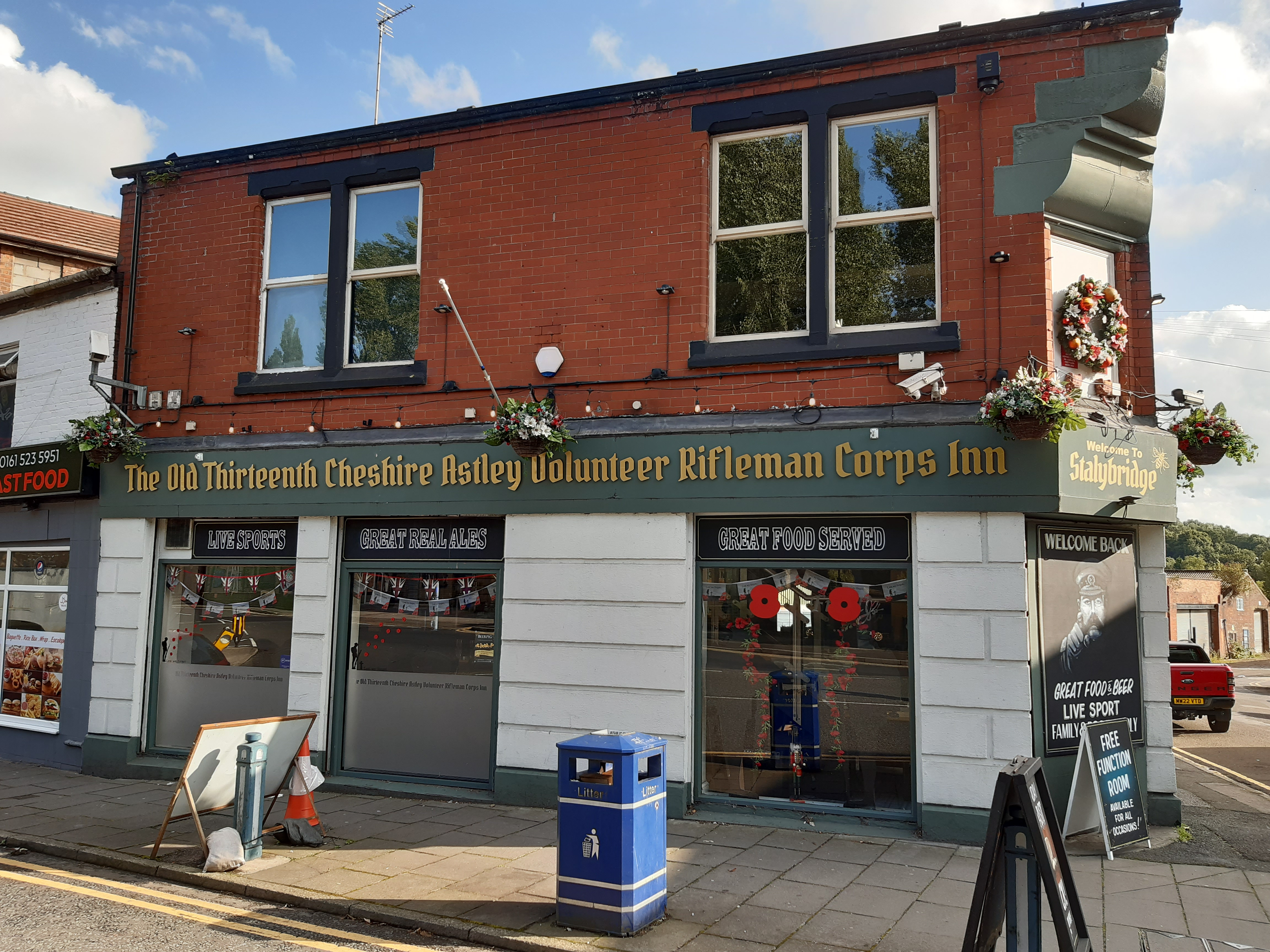
The Old Thirteenth Cheshire Astley Volunteer Rifleman Corps Inn

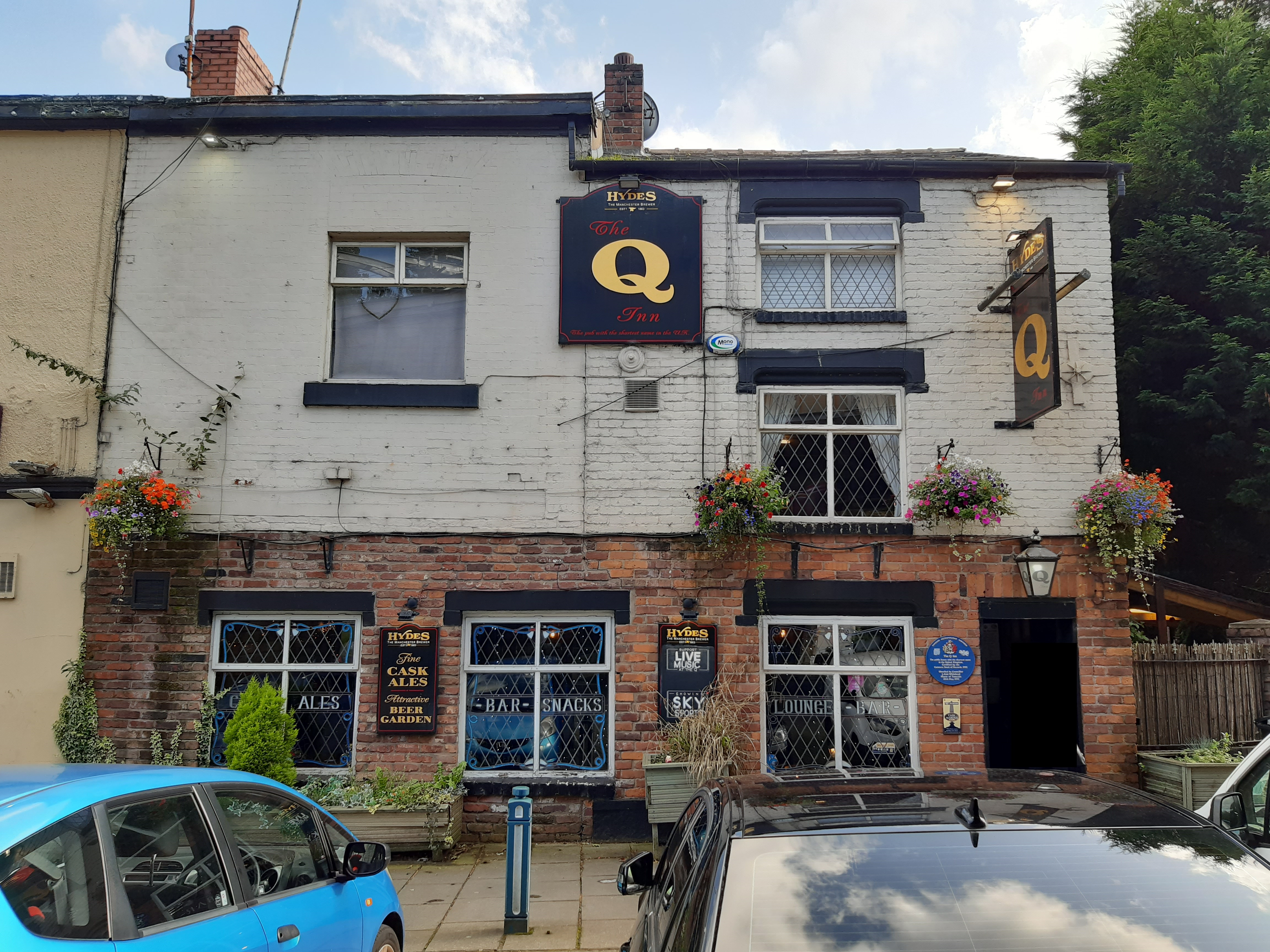
Q

Stalybridge is home to the pub with the longest name in Britain: the Old Thirteenth Cheshire Astley Volunteer Rifleman Corps Inn, which closed in June 2016 but reopened in April 2019; it also has the shortest: Q.

The railway station is one of the last in Britain to retain its original buffet; the 1998 refurbishment of which won awards from CAMRA and English Heritage.

The restoration of the canal between 1999 and 2001 attracted new commercial ventures, such as riverside cafés and boat trips. The reopening of the canal and the fact that the Tame runs through the town centre resulted in the nickname "Little Venice". In recent years, Stalybridge has acquired another nickname, "Staly Vegas"; the nickname became popular and was used ironically after the controversial conversion of premises in the shopping area into nightclubs and bars, the proliferation of takeaways and the refurbishment of some of the more traditional pubs.

The town's traditional foods include Tater Hash, (Note: Potato pie, or meat and potato pie.) a variation on Lancashire Hotpot and black peas. (Note: Today, black peas are eaten mainly on Whit Friday.) Stalybridge is the location of the region's last remaining tripe shop.

=== In popular culture ===
The town has been used for location shoots for various film and television series. The most notable of these was the John Schlesinger film Yanks, which featured Richard Gere and was released in 1979. The opening sequence of the film features Stalybridge War Memorial on Trinity Street and the US army camp scenes were filmed at Stamford Golf Club in spring 1978.

In 1986, the Children's BBC TV series Jossy's Giants was filmed in the town. In 2009, the BBC3 comedy We Are Klang was filmed at the Victoria Market Hall, and around the town centre. Scenes from Coronation Street, Making Out, Common As Muck and The League of Gentlemen have also been filmed there.

== Media ==
The Stalybridge Reporter is a weekly newspaper, which was established in 1855. With The North Cheshire Herald, it now serves the wider district under the name The Tamesider Reporter. Its office, and that of The Glossop Chronicle, is at Park House, Acres Lane. The weekly free newspaper, The Tameside Advertiser, was established in 1979; it is now owned by Trinity Mirror and distributed throughout Stalybridge.

Local news and television programmes are provided by BBC North West and ITV Granada. Television signals are received from the Winter Hill TV transmitter and one of the two local relay transmitters (Saddleworth and Brock Bottom.)

Local radio stations are BBC Radio Manchester, Capital Manchester and Lancashire, Heart North West, Smooth North West, Greatest Hits Radio Manchester & The North West, and Tameside Radio, a community based station.

== Sport ==
Wild Bank, with Bower Fold, the home of Stalybridge Celtic, in the foreground

From the end of the 19th century until 1909, the main football team in the town was Stalybridge Rovers. The club reached the 1st round of the FA Cup in the 1900/01 season; its players included Arthur Wharton and Herbert Chapman.

Today, the town's team is Stalybridge Celtic, which was founded 1909. It is one of four FIFA-recognised teams to be called Celtic. Usually based in non-league football, they are presently members of the Northern Premier League Division One West, in the eighth tier of English football.

There are two main cricket clubs in the town:

- Stayley C.C. plays in Millbrook and is a member of the Greater Manchester Cricket League.
- Stalybridge St Paul's C.C. plays on Cheetham Hill Road, Dukinfield on the ground formerly used by the former Stalybridge Cricket Club. It is a member of the Cheshire League Pyramid and plays in the first division of the Cheshire Alliance.

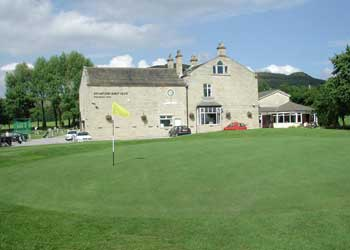
Stamford Golf Club clubhouse, Oakfield House

Stamford Golf Club on Huddersfield Road has an 18-hole course. The club was incorporated on 24 August 1901 and was named after the local landowner the Earl of Stamford. It is a member of the Cheshire Union of Golf Clubs.

Priory Tennis Club is situated next to Cheetham's Park on Mottram Road. There are four astroturf courts, all with floodlights. The club is fully affiliated to the Cheshire branch of the Lawn Tennis Association.

The local athletics club is East Cheshire Harriers, founded in 1922 by an amalgamation of Dukinfield Harriers and Tintwistle Harriers. The club's headquarters was once in Stalybridge, but us now the Richmond Park Stadium, in Ashton.

A snooker league is operated by the Stalybridge and District Snooker, Billiards and Whist League, which has been in existence since 1910. The league starts around October each year and runs until May.

There are two crown green bowling clubs in the town. One in Stamford Park and one at Carrbrook village bowling green, where there is also a pétanque terrain.

In 1901, Joey Nuttall, of Stalybridge, lowered the world swimming record for the quarter-mile by 13 seconds, with a time of five minutes and 38 seconds. In the same year, he asserted his right to the title of the champion swimmer of the world beating three competitors in the 600 yards (550 m) championship race at Doncaster, covering the distance in six minutes and 30 seconds to win by a length and a half. His share of the spoil was £10, a cup and two-thirds of the gate money. By 1901, Nuttall had held the 500 yards (460 m) world championship for over ten years. Stalybridge has a 25-metre six-lane pool at Copley Recreation Centre, which is home to the Stalybridge Amateur Swimming and Water Polo Club.

In 2006, Stalybridge-born cyclist Hamish Haynes won the UK National Road Race Championship.

== Notable people ==
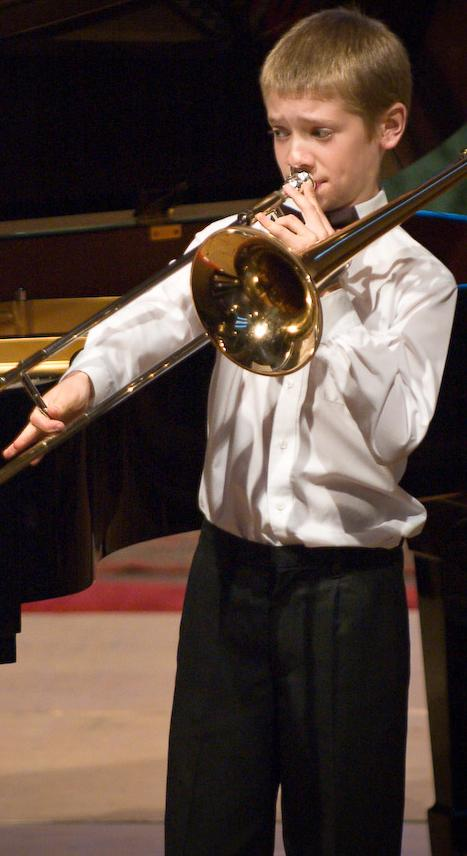
Peter Moore, 2007

- Ralph Staveley (ca.1362-ca.1420), lord of the manor of Staley Hall
- John Bradbury (1768–1823), botanist, published an eyewitness account of the 1811–1812 New Madrid earthquakes
- John Cheetham (1802–86), a prosperous cotton manufacturer; MP for South Lancashire 1852-59 & Salford 1865-68
- John Buckley (1813–76), recipient of the Victoria Cross for gallant conduct at The Defence of the Magazine at Delhi in 1857
- Hugh Mason (1817–86), mill owner, social reformer, politician and MP for Ashton-under-Lyne in 1880-85.
- James Sidebottom (1824–71), businessman and politician, first singleton MP for Stalybridge 1868-71
- Robert Stanley (1828–1911), grocer, tea trader and Mayor of Stalybridge, 1874-76
- John Frederick Cheetham (1835–1916), cotton mill-owner; MP for North Derbyshire in 1880-85 and Stalybridge in 1905-10
- William Summers (1853–93), politician and barrister; MP for Stalybridge 1880-85
- Sir John Wood, 1st Baronet (1857–1951), politician, MP for Stalybridge in 1910-18 and then for Stalybridge and Hyde in 1918-22.
- Tom Fox (1860–1934), cotton mill worker, trade unionist, politician and Lord Mayor of Manchester, 1916-20
- Stanley Royle (1888–1961), a post-impressionist landscape painter and illustrator.

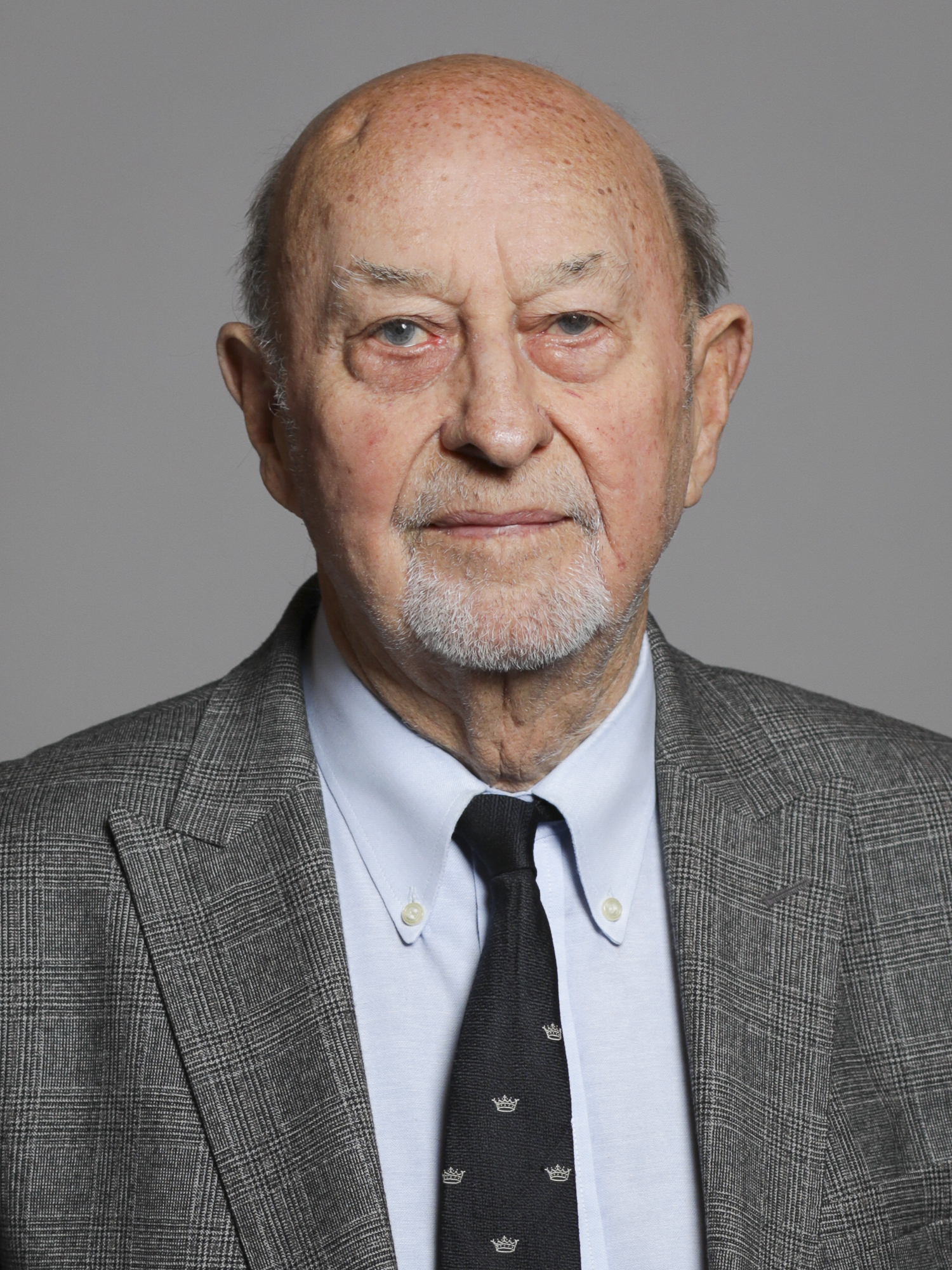
Baron Tom Pendry, 2020

- Thomas Pendry, Baron Pendry (1934–2023), politician, MP for Stalybridge and Hyde 1970-2001.
- Peter Kenyon (born 1954), businessman, CEO of Umbro and former chief executive of Manchester United and Chelsea
- Anushka Asthana (born 1980), journalist, TV presenter with Channel 4 News and author; brought up locally
- Peter Moore (born 1996), trombonist, won BBC Young Musician in 2008, appointed to London Symphony Orchestra aged 18.

=== Sport ===
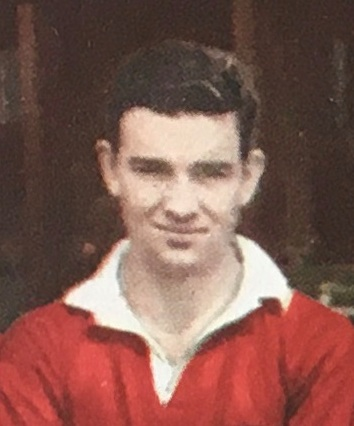
Jackie Blanchflower, in 1957

- Tommy Broad (1887–1966), footballer who played 433 games, including 134 for Oldham Athletic
- Jimmy Broad (1891–1963), footballer who played 162 games including 108 for Stoke City
- John Lees (1930–2021), bodybuilder, later a wrestler and winner of Mr. Universe in 1957
- Jackie Blanchflower (1933-98) footballer, played 105 games for Manchester United, injured in the Munich air disaster, died locally
- Derek Wilkinson (1935–2017), footballer who played 212 games for Sheffield Wednesday
- John Sullivan (1945–2006), a Lancashire cricketer who played 154 first-class cricket matches
- Mark Williams (born 1970), footballer who played 401 games including 158 for Chesterfield
- Paul Mitchell (born 1981), footballer who has played 162 games beginning with 64 for Wigan Athletic
- Kieran Lee (born 1988)), footballer who has played over 380 games including 196 for Sheffield Wednesday
- Rob Holding (born 1995), footballer, played 98 games for Arsenal, now with Colorado Rapids.
- Callum Camps (born 1995). footballer who has played over 350 games, beginning with 201 at Rochdale.

== See also ==
- Listed buildings in Stalybridge
