= Antony Copley =

British historian (1937–2016)

- Born: 1 July 1937
- Died: 18 July 2016 (aged 79)
- Education: Gresham's School, Worcester College, Oxford

Antony R. H. Copley (1 July 1937 – 18 July 2016) was a British historian. He was an honorary professor at the University of Kent at Canterbury, and specialised in nineteenth century French history and modern Indian history.

He was born on 1 July 1937 in Hertfordshire, the son of Alan Copley, a solicitor, and Iris Copley, and educated at Gresham's School and Worcester College, Oxford.

In 1967, he joined the staff at the University of Kent at Canterbury, and was granted an honorary professorship when he retired.

In 1959 Copley was found by the police in a public lavatory and arrested for importuning with immoral purposes. On the advice of his solicitor father, he pleaded guilty. At the time of his death he was looking forward to a general pardon for men who like himself had been convicted of homosexual acts.

== Publications ==
- Sexual Moralities in France, 1780-1980: New Ideas on the Family, Divorce, and Homosexuality: An Essay on Moral Change, Routledge (1989)
- Gandhi: Against the Tide, Oxford University Press (1996)
- Religions in Conflict: Ideology, Cultural Contact and Conversion in Late-Colonial India, Oxford India Paperbacks, 2000
- Gandhi, Freedom, and Self-Rule (Global Encounters: Studies in Comparative Political Theory) by Anthony J. Parel, Judith M. Brown, Antony Copley and Fred Dallmayr (2000)
- Gurus and their followers: New religious reform movements in Colonial India, Oxford University Press, ISBN 978-0195649581 (2000)
- A Spiritual Bloomsbury: Hinduism and Homosexuality in the Lives and Writings of Edward Carpenter, E.M. Forster, and Christopher Isherwood, Lexington, (2006)
- Hinduism in Public and Private Reform, Hindutva, Gender, and Sampraday, Oxford India Paperbacks, 2009
- Music and the Spiritual: Composers and Politics in the 20th Century, Ziggurat, (2012)
- A Memoir: Historian and Homosexual: Search for a Postwar Identity: Edited Diaries and Journals, Fastprint publishing, (2016)
