= Evan Copley =

American academic and musician (1930–2018)

Robert Evan Copley (March 22, 1930 – September 13, 2018) was an American academic and musician who has published several theory textbooks, including Harmony: Baroque to Contemporary.

Copley's numerous compositions include symphonic, choral, band, keyboard, and chamber music works. In February 1990, his Ninth Symphony was premiered, and in 1986, the Mormon Tabernacle Choir broadcast Copley's motet, "In Thee, O God, Do I Put My Trust" to 350 radio stations and 40 television stations. His Third Piano Concerto was premiered in 1988 by Daniel Graham and the Greeley Philharmonic Orchestra. Also in 1988, Copley was named UNC's Distinguished Scholar of the Year. In the summer of 1991, Copley was named composer-in-residence at the Breckenridge Music Institute. Copley received his MM and Ph.D. degrees from Michigan State University.
