= Copley, Greater Manchester =

Area of Stalybridge, Greater Manchester, England

Coordinates: 53°29′17″N 2°02′24″W

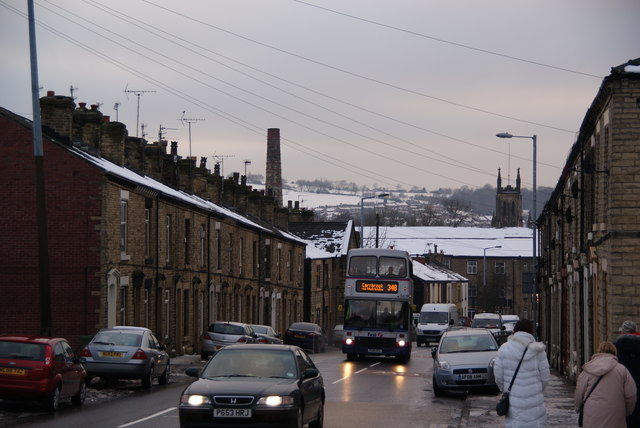
Huddersfield Road with St Paul's church in the background

Copley is an area of the town of Stalybridge, at the foot of the Pennines, 8 miles (13 km) east of Manchester in Greater Manchester, England. The area has a local secondary school, Copley Academy, which is attached to a local recreational centre and swimming pool.
