= Rebecca Copley =

American soprano opera singer

Rebecca Copley (born January 1952) is an American soprano opera singer.

== Career ==
Copley is a resident of Lindsborg, Kansas, a Swedish arts community and the home of Bethany College, where she received her training. She began her career as a concert soprano and has performed with many American orchestras.

Cropley made her New York concert debut in 1986 as the soprano soloist in Johann Sebastian Bach's Mass in B minor with the Musica Sacra chorus and conductor Richard Westenburg at Avery Fisher Hall. She performed with that ensemble again at the same venue as the soprano soloist in the world premiere of McNeil Robinson's Messe Solennelle (1987), and Wolfgang Amadeus Mozart's Coronation Mass (1988).

Copley made her professional opera debut in 1987 as Desdemona in Giuseppe Verdi's Otello at the New Jersey State Opera opposite James McCracken in the title role. Soon after, she performed excerpts from several operas in multiple concerts with the New Jersey Symphony Orchestra; among them Tristan und Isolde (1987) and Lohengrin (1988). She also was a soprano soloist with that orchestra in performances of Verdi's Requiem and Beethoven's Symphony No. 9. She performed the latter work again with the New Haven Symphony Orchestra in 1991. In 1988 she was the soprano soloist in the United States premiere of Eduard Tubin's Symphony No. 3. with the Long Island Philharmonic.

In 1991 Copley made her debut at the New York City Opera in the title role of Giacomo Puccini's Turandot. She made an unexpected debut at the Metropolitan Opera on October 3, 1992; replacing an ailing Aprile Millo mid performance in the role of Amelia in Un ballo in maschera for acts II and III of the opera. She went on the sing the entire opera at the Met for the following October 7, 1992 performance with Richard Leech as Riccardo, Juan Pons as Renato, and Harolyn Blackwell as Oscar. Subsequent roles she has performed at the Met include The First Lady in The Magic Flute (1993), Gerhilde in Die Walküre (2004 and 2005), Abigaille in Nabucco (2004), and the title role in Turandot (2005).
