= Copley Academy =

Dixons Pennine Academy

Location
- Huddersfield Road; Copley; Stalybridge, Greater Manchester, SK15 3RR; England
- Coordinates: 53.48693°N 2.03922°W

Information
- Type: Academy
- Local authority: Tameside Council
- Department for Education URN: 139294 Tables
- Ofsted: Reports
- Gender: Coeducational
- Age: 11 to 16
- Colours: Black and blue
- Website: https://www.dixonspa.com/

Dixons Pennine Academy (formerly Copley High School and Copley Academy) is a coeducational secondary school with academy status. It is located in the Copley area of Stalybridge in the English county of Greater Manchester.

Previously a community school administered by Tameside Metropolitan Borough Council, Copley High School converted to academy status on 1 February 2013 and was renamed Copley Academy. The school is now part of the Great Academies Education Trust which also includes Great Academy Ashton in Ashton-under-Lyne and Silver Springs Primary Academy in Stalybridge.

Copley Academy was renamed Dixons Pennine Academy on March 1st 2026 when Great Academies Education Trust merged with Dixons Academies Trust, a large academy trust in the north west of England.

Copley Academy offers GCSEs, BTECs and Cambridge Nationals as programmes of study for pupils. The school also has specialisms in mathematics and ICT.

The Copley Academy was established in 1968 as part of the local authority's initiative to expand secondary education in the Tameside area. Originally named Copley High School, it was built to serve the rapidly growing suburban communities around Stalybridge. The school was designed with modernist architectural features typical of the late 1960s, including spacious classrooms and dedicated facilities for science and the arts. Over the decades, the school has undergone several renovations to update its infrastructure and accommodate advances in technology and pedagogy.

Development and Changes in Education Throughout the 1980s and 1990s, Copley High School adapted to the changing educational landscape in England, including the introduction of the National Curriculum and new assessment methods. The school placed increasing emphasis on vocational training alongside traditional academic subjects, reflecting the needs of the local community and economy. This period also saw a rise in extracurricular activities, with Copley gaining recognition for its sports teams and music programs.

Transition to Academy Status In 2012, as part of government reforms encouraging schools to convert to academy status, Copley High School became The Copley Academy. This transition granted the school greater autonomy from the local education authority, allowing it to tailor its curriculum and management structure more closely to student needs. The academy invested heavily in technology upgrades and new teaching resources, aiming to raise educational standards and improve exam results.

Community Engagement and Facilities The Copley Academy has long maintained strong ties with the local community. It regularly hosts events such as open days, charity fundraisers, and adult learning courses. The school's sports facilities are also used by local clubs and residents, fostering community involvement. Recent additions to the campus include a modern sports hall and a dedicated performing arts center, which support both curricular and extracurricular activities.

Recent Achievements and Future Plans In recent years, The Copley Academy has been recognized for its progress in raising student attainment and supporting inclusive education. It has developed specialized programs to support students with special educational needs and has strengthened its partnerships with local businesses and higher education institutions. Looking forward, the academy plans to expand its STEM offerings and enhance digital learning, preparing students for the challenges of the 21st century workforce.
