= Scheduled monuments in Greater Manchester =

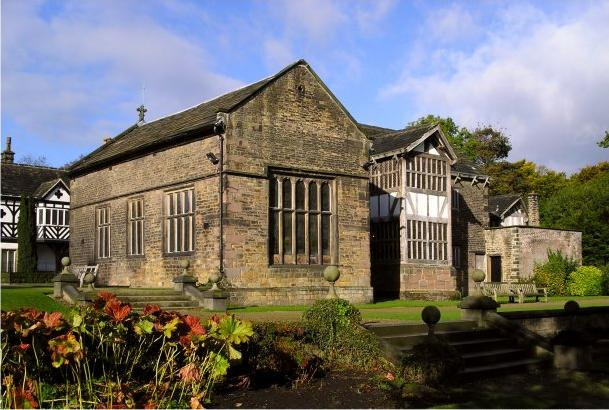
Smithills Hall is one of several medieval manor houses in Greater Manchester to be protected as a scheduled monument

There are 46 scheduled monuments in Greater Manchester, a metropolitan county in North West England. In the United Kingdom, a scheduled monument is a "nationally important" archaeological site or historic building that has been given protection against unauthorised change by being placed on a list (or "schedule") by the Secretary of State for Culture, Media and Sport, following advice from Historic England. Scheduled monuments are defined in the Ancient Monuments and Archaeological Areas Act 1979 and the National Heritage Act 1983. There are nearly 20,000 entries on the schedule, which is maintained by Historic England as part of the National Heritage List for England; more than one site can be included in a single entry. While a scheduled monument can also be recognised as a listed building, Historic England's aim is to ensure that the most appropriate form of protection is applied to the building or site. Applications to deschedule a site are administered by Historic England, which carries out an assessment and makes a recommendation to the Secretary of State.

The metropolitan county of Greater Manchester is composed of ten metropolitan boroughs: Bolton, Bury, Manchester, Oldham, Rochdale, Salford, Stockport, Tameside, Trafford and Wigan. The scheduled monuments in each borough are listed separately. They range from prehistoric structures—the oldest of which date from the Bronze Age—to more modern structures such as Astley Green Colliery, which dates from 1908. Greater Manchester has seven prehistoric monuments (i.e. Bronze or Iron Age), found in Bury, Oldham, Salford, Stockport, and Tameside. The Bronze Age sites are mainly cairns and barrows, and both the Iron Age sites are military in nature, being promontory forts.

The trend of military sites continues from the Iron Age into the Roman period; two Roman forts in Greater Manchester are scheduled monuments and were the two main areas of Roman activity in the county. Of the nine castles in Greater Manchester, four are scheduled monuments: Buckton Castle, Watch Hill Castle, Bury Castle, and Radcliffe Tower. The last two are fortified manor houses, and although defined as castles, they were not exclusively military in nature; they probably acted as the administrative centre of the manors they served. There are several other manor houses and country houses—some with moats—in the county that are protected as scheduled monuments. Astley Green Colliery, Marple Aqueduct, Oldknow's Limekilns, and Worsley Delph are scheduled relics of Greater Manchester's industrial history.

== Bolton ==
Name	Remains	Date	Location	Description	Ref(s)^{[A]}
Round cairn (nr. Old Harper's Farm)	Cairn	Bronze Age	Horwich 53.6070°N 2.5107°W	On the eastern slope of Adam Hill, in the Winter Hill massif, a round cairn on a local high point 280 metres (920 ft) west of Old Harpers Farm. It is a slightly oval mound of stones, covered with turf, measuring approximately 12 m (39 ft) by 11.5 m (38 ft) and standing 0.4 m (1 ft 4 in) high. The cairn is unexcavated and retains undisturbed deposits of archaeological value.	
Stone circle, ring cairn and two round cairns	Cairns	Bronze Age	Egerton 53.6388°N 2.4303°W	A prehistoric complex comprising a damaged stone circle, a ring cairn, and two round cairns. The site lies on a high ridge above Bromley Cross, close to the boundary with Lancashire, and preserves significant archaeological remains despite historic disturbance.	
Moated site at Arley Hall	Moat	13th–14th century	Blackrod 53.5909°N 2.6214°W	A well‑preserved medieval moated site consisting of a near‑circular, water‑filled moat enclosing a central platform occupied by a later house. The moat survives to substantial width with stone‑revetted banks, and access is provided by a 19th‑century iron bridge.	
Smithills Hall	Standing building	14th century	Bolton 53.6023°N 2.4542°W	Originally built in the early 14th century, but was extended in the 15th and 16th centuries. The oldest surviving part is the great hall, which dates from the early 15th century. The site was originally moated; however, no trace of the moat survives. Smithills Hall is now a Grade I listed building and is open to the public as a museum.	
Ringley Old Bridge	Stone bridge	1677	Stoneclough, Kearsley 53.5437°N 2.3573°W	The current bridge over the River Irwell was built in 1677 to replace one that was washed away in 1673. It is still in use today, having been pedestrianised, and is a Grade II* listed building.	
Chequerbent embankment	Railway embankment	c. 1828	Westhoughton 53.5505°N 2.4944°W	A surviving section of the Bolton and Leigh Railway, located between the A6 Manchester Road and the M61 motorway, approximately 200 m (660 ft) east of the A58, and preserved as an earth embankment with a raised stone‑built track bed.	

== Bury ==
Name	Remains	Date	Location	Description	Ref(s)^{[A]}
Castlesteads	Earthworks	200 BC–250 AD	Bury 53.6129°N 2.3070°W	A promontory fort on the banks of the River Irwell. The site is defended by a ditch 120 m (390 ft) long and 6 m (20 ft) wide, along with a silted-up channel of the river. The interior is triangular in shape. Pottery finds indicate the site was occupied from 200 BC to 250 AD.	
Radcliffe Tower	Ruins	1403	Radcliffe 53.5636°N 2.3083°W	The only surviving part of a medieval manor house that belonged to James de Radliffe, the Lord of the manor of Radcliffe. The house was a stone-built hall with two towers and was surrounded by a moat. The site was fortified with crenellations and battlements, added with permission from the king. The manor house was demolished in the 19th century, and the tower is now a Grade I listed building.	
Bury Castle	Below ground remains	1469	Bury 53.5937°N 2.2970°W	A manor house built in 1469, replacing an earlier building on the same site dating from the late 14th century. It was constructed by Sir Thomas Pilkington, Lord of the manors of Bury and Pilkington, and fortified with the king's permission; it was later razed to the ground when Sir Thomas had his lands confiscated for supporting the losing side in the War of the Roses. Some of the castle remains have been excavated and are now on display to the public.	
Affetside Cross	Stone pillar	17th or 18th century	Affetside 53.6190°N 2.3710°W	The pillar was originally a cross and replaced a medieval waymarker in the 17th or 18th century. It stands on three circular steps, which probably date from 1890, when the cross was taken down for repairs and re-erected.	

== Manchester ==
Name	Remains	Date	Location	Description	Ref(s)^{[A]}
Mamucium	Below ground remains	79	Castlefield 53.4747°N 2.2532°W	A Roman fort was established on a sandstone bluff near a crossing of the River Medlock, along the line of the Roman road between Chester (Deva Victrix) and York (Eboracum). It was designed to garrison a cohort of 500 auxiliary soldiers, and a civilian settlement (vicus) of traders and families developed around it. Around 140, the fort was demolished and the settlement was abandoned at roughly the same time. The fort was rebuilt in 160 and the settlement re-inhabited. It was abandoned by the mid-3rd century, although the fort remained in use into the early 4th century. A partial reconstruction of the fort on the site is open to the public.	
Nico Ditch^{[B]}	Earthwork	7th–9th centuries	Ashton-under-Lyne and Denton 53.4531°N 2.3999°W	An earthwork stretching from Ashton Moss in the east to Hough Moss in the west. According to legend, it was dug in a single night as a defence against Viking invaders in 869–870. However, its U-shaped profile suggests it was not defensive, as a true defensive ditch would more likely be V-shaped. It was probably used as an administrative boundary. The ditch is visible in sections and, in places, is about 1.5 m (4.9 ft) deep and up to 4 m (13 ft) wide.	
Baguley Hall	Standing building	14th century	Baguley 53.3950°N 2.2764°W	The original building may date from the 11th or 12th century, but the current timber-framed house is from the 14th century. The medieval north wing was refaced in brick, and the brick south wing was added in the 18th century. It is considered one of the "finest surviving medieval halls in the northwest of England". It is a Grade I listed building, and is on the Buildings at Risk Register; its condition is rated as "poor" and it is owned by Heritage Trust for the North West.	
Peel Hall	Waterlogged moat	14th century	Ashton New Road, Manchester 53.3780°N 2.2443°W	In the mid-14th century, Sir John de Arderne built Peel Hall. The site is surrounded by a moat between 8 and 14 m (26 and 46 ft) wide and 1.2 m (3.9 ft) deep. Peel Hall was demolished in 1809 and replaced by a farmhouse on the same site, which was itself demolished in 1975.	
Hanging Bridge	Ruins	1421	Cateaton Street, Manchester 53.4845°N 2.2433°W	The current structure was built in 1421; however, the first reference to the bridge dates from 1343. The bridge, which is 33 m (108 ft) long and 2.7 m (8.9 ft) wide, spanned Hanging Ditch and formed part of medieval Manchester's defences. Hanging Bridge was probably obscured by housing in the 1770s as a result of Manchester's expansion. It was uncovered in the 1880s, and again in the late 20th century, and is now on display in Manchester Cathedral's visitor centre.	
Clayton Hall	Standing building	15th century	Clayton 53.4834°N 2.1787°W	The hall, which probably dates back to the 15th century, was originally either a quadrangle or a three-winged structure. Much of it was demolished in the 17th century and replaced by a new house. Clayton Hall underwent further alterations and restoration in the 18th century and again in 1900. It stands on a rectangular island surrounded by a moat and is a Grade II* listed building.	

== Oldham ==
Name	Remains	Date	Location	Description	Ref(s)^{[A]}
Saddleworth Bowl Barrow	Earthworks	Bronze Age	Saddleworth 53.5636°N 2.0300°W	The barrow is oval-shaped and measures 17 m (56 ft) by 18 m (59 ft), with a height of 0.5 m (1.6 ft). It has been archaeologically excavated, but no grave goods or human remains were found. The site is in good condition.	
Castleshaw Roman fort	Below ground remains	79	Castleshaw, Saddleworth 53.5832°N 2.0017°W	In 79, a Roman fort was established at Castleshaw to house a garrison of 500 auxiliary soldiers, forming part of the frontier defences along the road between Chester (Deva Victrix) and York (Eboracum). It was slighted in 90, but a smaller fort—or fortlet—was built on the site in 105, designed for a garrison of fewer than 100. A civilian settlement (vicus), made up of traders and hangers-on associated with the soldiers, developed around the fort in the 2nd century. The fortlet was abandoned in the mid-120s when it was superseded by the neighbouring forts at Manchester and Slack. About the same time, the civilian settlement was also abandoned. A series of ditches and earthworks was constructed to mark the site.	

== Rochdale ==
Name	Remains	Date	Location	Description	Ref(s)^{[A]}
Blackstone Edge Roman road	Paved causeway	Uncertain	Littleborough 53.6491°N 2.0506°W	The so‑called Roman road is a paved causeway running between Littleborough and Ripponden. Although long identified as Roman, its date is uncertain: Calderdale archives note that "doubt remains as to whether it is old enough to be Roman." According to the Roman Roads Research Association (RRRA), a medieval packhorse track passes beneath part of the structure, indicating that the paved surface is later in date. The RRRA concludes that the causeway is "almost certainly" an early turnpike, probably constructed in 1735, rather than a Roman road.	
March Barn Bridge	Bridge	c. 1800	Castleton 53.5958°N 2.1729°W	An early 19th‑century skew bridge on the Rochdale Canal, notable as one of the first properly constructed skew bridges in England. Built during the canal's original construction, it carries a roadway over the canal using coursed stone set in a helical pattern.	

== Salford ==
Name	Remains	Date	Location	Description	Ref(s)^{[A]}
Iron Age promontory fort	Below ground remains	500BC–200AD	Salford 53.4376°N 2.4651°W	The promontory fort is enclosed by two ditches. Within the interior are four circular structures that were probably used as industrial areas and livestock enclosures. The Cheshire Very Coarse Pottery (VCP) found on the site provides the only evidence of a late prehistoric pottery industry in Greater Manchester.	
Wardley Hall moated site	Moat	Late 13th century	Worsley 53.5154°N 2.3671°W	The moat, recorded as early as 1292, forms a roughly rectangular island on which the later manor house was constructed. The water‑filled moat survives on all sides and is considered to be of medieval origin, representing a high‑status domestic site typical of the period. The island is thought to have contained earlier timber buildings predating the present hall, which is largely of 16th and 17th‑century date.	
Worsley Delph	Brick structure	1759	Swinton 53.5008°N 2.3792°W	In 1759 construction began on a system of underground canals that provided a route between Worsley Colliery and the Bridgewater Canal for transporting the coal produced there. The canals remained in use for this purpose until 1887 and were closed shortly after the last coal pit in the area shut in 1968.	
Barton Aqueduct embankment and retaining walls	Walls	1760–61	Barton upon Irwell 53.4753°N 2.3534°W	The surviving embanked section of James Brindley's aqueduct, together with its associated retaining walls. This includes the later strengthening work which enlarged the embankment between 1822 and 1824, as well as the section of the original canal that was infilled in 1894 when the canal was realigned eastwards as part of the construction of the Manchester Ship Canal. The embankment formed the approach to the stone aqueduct that once carried the Bridgewater Canal over the River Irwell and represents one of the earliest major engineering works of the canal age.	
Lime kiln and associated culvert	Below ground remains	c. 1770	Worsley 53.4978°N 2.3779°W	A disused twin‑pot lime kiln and an associated culvert over Worsley Brook. The remains survive as an earth mound containing buried structural elements, including brick and stone tunnels and standing brick and stone walls.	

== Stockport ==
Name	Remains	Date	Location	Description	Ref(s)^{[A]}
Brown Low	Earthworks	Bronze Age	Ludworth, Hazel Grove 53.4149°N 2.0177°W	A bowl barrow measuring 25.5 m (84 ft) in diameter and 2 m (6.6 ft) in height. The mound is grass-covered, and two visible hollows on its surface mark the site of an excavation carried out in 1809.	
Cairn	Mound of stones	Bronze Age	Ludworth, Hazel Grove 53.3819°N 2.0202°W	The late Bronze Age cairn measures 12 m (39 ft) in diameter and 0.4 m (1.3 ft) in height. It contains a series of chambers and cremation cists. Positioned on a knoll on Mellor Moor, the cairn is prominently sited and highly visible in the surrounding landscape.	
Peel Moat	Dry moat	Medieval	Heaton Moor 53.4287°N 2.1884°W	The dried-up rectangular moat surrounds the site of a square-shaped fortified tower. There are no above-ground remains of the tower, but it stood on a plot of land measuring 29 m (95 ft) square, with the moat around it ranging from 5.5 m (18 ft) to 10 m (33 ft) in width.	
Torkington Moat	Water-logged moat	Medieval	Torkington 53.3849°N 2.0910°W	The moat surrounds the site of the manor house first built in 1350. It is 1.6 m (5.2 ft) deep, between 8 and 20 m (26 and 66 ft) wide, and encloses an island measuring 46 m (151 ft) by 43 m (141 ft). Torkington Hall replaced the medieval manor house in the early 17th century.	
Oldknow's Limekilns	Lime kilns	1797	Marple 53.3927°N 2.0557°W	Between 1797 and 1800, Samuel Oldknow built three lime kilns on the east side of the Peak Forest Canal. The kilns are 11 m (36 ft) deep and were constructed into the hillside. The site remained in use into the 20th century, and the surviving kiln walling is now protected as a Grade II listed building.	
Marple Aqueduct	Aqueduct	1801	Marple 53.4070°N 2.0673°W	The aqueduct was built between 1794 and 1801 to carry the Peak Forest Canal over the River Goyt. It remains in use today, carrying pleasure craft along the canal and forming one of the most prominent engineering features of the route.	

== Tameside ==
Name	Remains	Date	Location	Description	Ref(s)^{[A]}
Cairn	Mound of stones	Bronze Age	Stalybridge 53.4788°N 2.0184°W	The turf covered round cairn is situated on top of a hill, and consists of a mound of stones with a flat top. It is 1 m (3.3 ft) tall and 16 m (52 ft) in diameter, although the southern edge has been destroyed. The site has been altered in modern period by the addition of a dry stone wall and a trigonometrical pillar.	
Nico Ditch^{[B]}	Earthwork	5th–11th centuries	Denton 53.4611°N 2.1454°W	A surviving section of the early medieval ditch, a linear earthwork running east–west across Greater Manchester. At this point on Denton Golf Course, the ditch survives as a well‑preserved earthwork defined by a shallow linear depression representing part of a boundary feature dug between the 5th and 11th centuries. This section is protected for its archaeological value as one of the few intact stretches of the ditch, which elsewhere has been largely levelled by later development.	
Buckton Castle	Below ground remains	1180s	Carrbrook 53.5111°N 2.0162°W	An enclosure castle, probably built by the earls of Chester in the 12th century. It may have been constructed to guard the Longdendale Valley. The castle was first recorded in 1360, when it was already in a ruinous state. It is circular in form, measuring 35 m (115 ft) and 45 m (148 ft) along its axes, and is surrounded by a ditch 10 m (33 ft) wide and 6 m (20 ft) deep. The castle has been damaged by 18th-century treasure hunters and by quarrying in the 19th and 20th centuries.	
Post-medieval glassworks	Below ground remains	1612	Denton 53.4485°N 2.0896°W	A post‑medieval glassworks located 250 m (820 ft) south‑east of Clarke's Bridge, consisting of the remains of furnace bases and other structures associated with glass production. The site preserves evidence of small‑scale industrial activity and the layout of a rural glassmaking operation.	

== Trafford ==
Name	Remains	Date	Location	Description	Ref(s)^{[A]}
Watch Hill Castle	Earthworks	12th century (probably)	Bowdon 53.3699°N 2.3789°W	The castle is a motte-and-bailey, consisting of a conical mound (motte) 40 m (130 ft) in diameter and 17 m (56 ft) high, surrounded by a triangular lower enclosure (bailey) covering 2,400 square metres (0.59 acres). It was probably built for Hamon de Massey, a baron who held several local manors, including Baguley, Bowdon, Dunham, and Hale. The site had fallen out of use by the 13th century.	

== Wigan ==
Name	Remains	Date	Location	Description	Ref(s)^{[A]}
Cross base	Cross base	Medieval	Junction of Green Lane, Standish Wood Lane and Beech Walk, Standish 53.5803°N 2.6620°W	One of four documented wayside crosses that delineated the medieval route between Wigan and Chorley. Serving both as navigational markers and as points of devotional significance, these crosses formed part of a wider network of route indicators across the region. The surviving base at this junction is no longer in its original position; it was relocated from its historic site when the road layout was altered and widened.	
Cross base	Cross base	Medieval	Green Lane, Standish 53.5811°N 2.6605°W	One of four documented wayside crosses that delineated the medieval route between Wigan and Chorley. It stands on Green Lane approximately 300 metres (980 ft) to the north of Strickland House Farm and is protected as a Grade II listed building.	
Cross base	Cross base	Medieval	Standish Wood Lane, Standish 53.5735°N 2.6605°W	One of four documented wayside crosses that delineated the medieval route between Wigan and Chorley. It is located approximately 700 metres (2,300 ft) south‑east of Standish Hall.	
Morleys Hall moated site	Standing building and moat	Medieval	Astley 53.4890°N 2.4678°W	A moated site centred on Morleys Hall, a 19th‑century house that incorporates substantial 16th and 17th‑century timber framing and was the home of Ambrose Barlow in 1641. The complex is enclosed by a broad, waterlogged medieval moat measuring approximately 12–15 m (39–49 ft) in width and around 3 m (9.8 ft) in depth. Morleys Hall is a Grade II* listed building.	
Standish Market Cross	Stone cross	Medieval	Market Place, Standish 53.5865°N 2.6606°W	The cross stands in the marketplace west of St Wilfrid's Church, its substantial stone base dating from the medieval period, while the present cross shaft is a later, modern replacement. The structure remains an important focal point within the historic village centre and is protected as a Grade II listed building.	
Mab's Cross	Stub of stone cross	13th century	Standishgate, Wigan 53.5511°N 2.6261°W	One of four documented wayside crosses that delineated the medieval route between Wigan and Chorley. In 1922 the cross was moved from its original position when the road was widened and is protected as a Grade II* listed building.	
New Hall moated site	Moat	16th century	Astley, Tyldesley 53.5057°N 2.4534°W	The moat encloses the site of the original medieval building, which was later replaced by a post‑medieval farmhouse. Although the moat remains water‑filled and well‑preserved, the ruined farmhouse itself lies outside the extent of the scheduled monument.	
Winstanley Hall moated site	Standing building and moat	1560s	Winstanley 53.5224°N 2.6874°W	Built in the 1560s for the Winstanley family of Wigan, Lords of the Manor, the hall is linked with neighbouring estates such as Bispham Hall (1573), Birchley Hall (1594), and Hacking Hall (1607). It was enlarged in the 17th and 18th centuries, with further 19th-century Jacobean-style alterations by Lewis Wyatt. The manorial complex includes a moated site with a rectangular island of about 50 m (160 ft) by 40 m (130 ft), enclosed on three sides by a waterlogged medieval moat up to 15 m (49 ft) wide and around 1 m (3 ft 3 in) deep, along with former fish ponds. The hall now stands decayed and unoccupied, and is designated as a Grade II* listed building.	
Gidlow Hall moated site	Standing building and moat	1574	Aspull 53.5585°N 2.5664°W	The present structure dates from around 1574, although it is thought to have replaced an earlier building. In 1840 the hall was rebuilt in the Gothic Revival style. The associated moated site is sub‑rectangular, with maximum dimensions of about 105 m (344 ft) north‑west to south‑east and 75 m (246 ft) north‑east to south‑west. Its water‑filled moat averages 9 m (30 ft) in width and appears to be at least 1.5 m (4 ft 11 in) deep. The hall is designated as a Grade II listed building.	
The Great Haigh Sough portal	Brick drainage	1653	Haigh 53.5591°N 2.6174°W	Between 1653 and 1670, the Haigh Sough drainage system was constructed to drain the local collieries. The system extends for 936 m (3,071 ft) and has only a single entrance. It remained in use until 1929, and the entrance is now covered by a steel grille to prevent access.	
Moat House moated site	Dried-up moat	18th century	Haigh 53.5766°N 2.6036°W	A medieval moated site comprising a square, dry moat preserved as a garden feature. Each side measures approximately 50 m (160 ft) externally, with stone‑lined edges to a depth of about 0.75 m (2 ft 6 in). The moat averages 1.5 m (4 ft 11 in) in depth and around 8 m (26 ft) in width, enclosing the site of Moat House, a Grade II listed building.	
Astley Green Colliery	Mining site	1908	Astley 53.4953°N 2.4446°W	The Pilkington Colliery Company began construction of the colliery in 1908, and the site opened for coal production in 1912. The colliery closed in 1970 and is now Astley Green Colliery Museum. Most of the buildings associated with the site have been demolished, as has one of the mine shafts.	

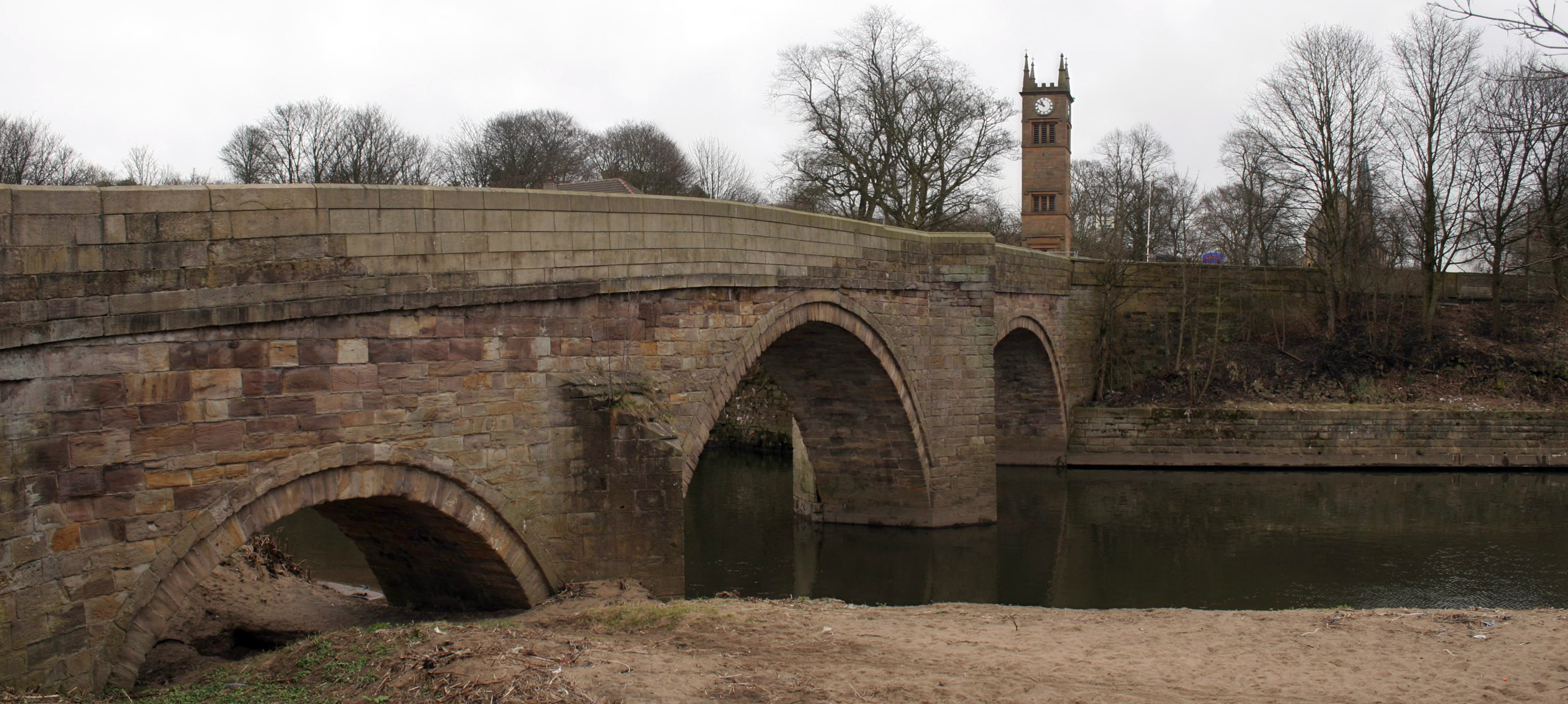
Ringley Old Bridge in Ringley

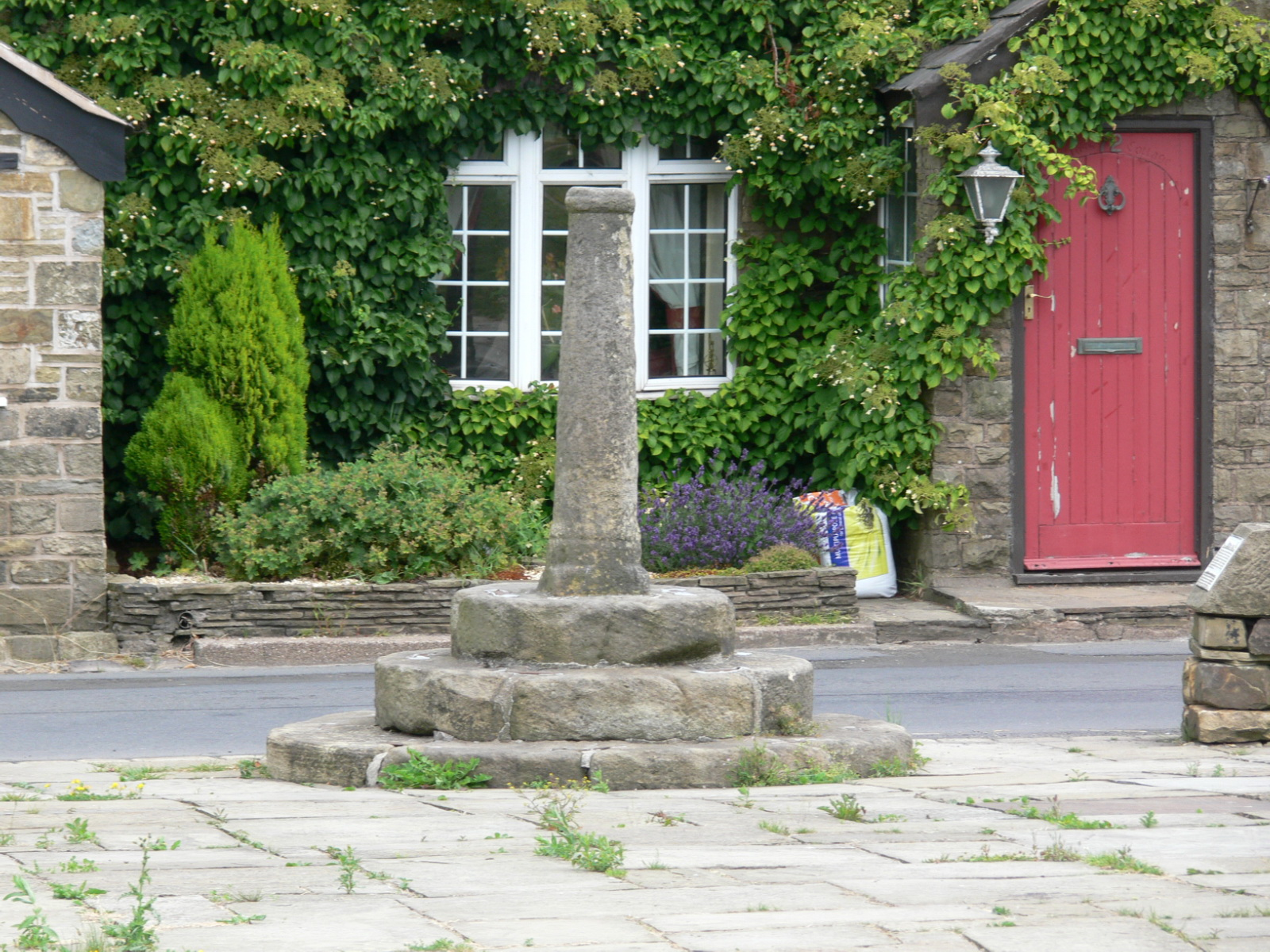
Affetside Cross replaced an earlier medieval cross

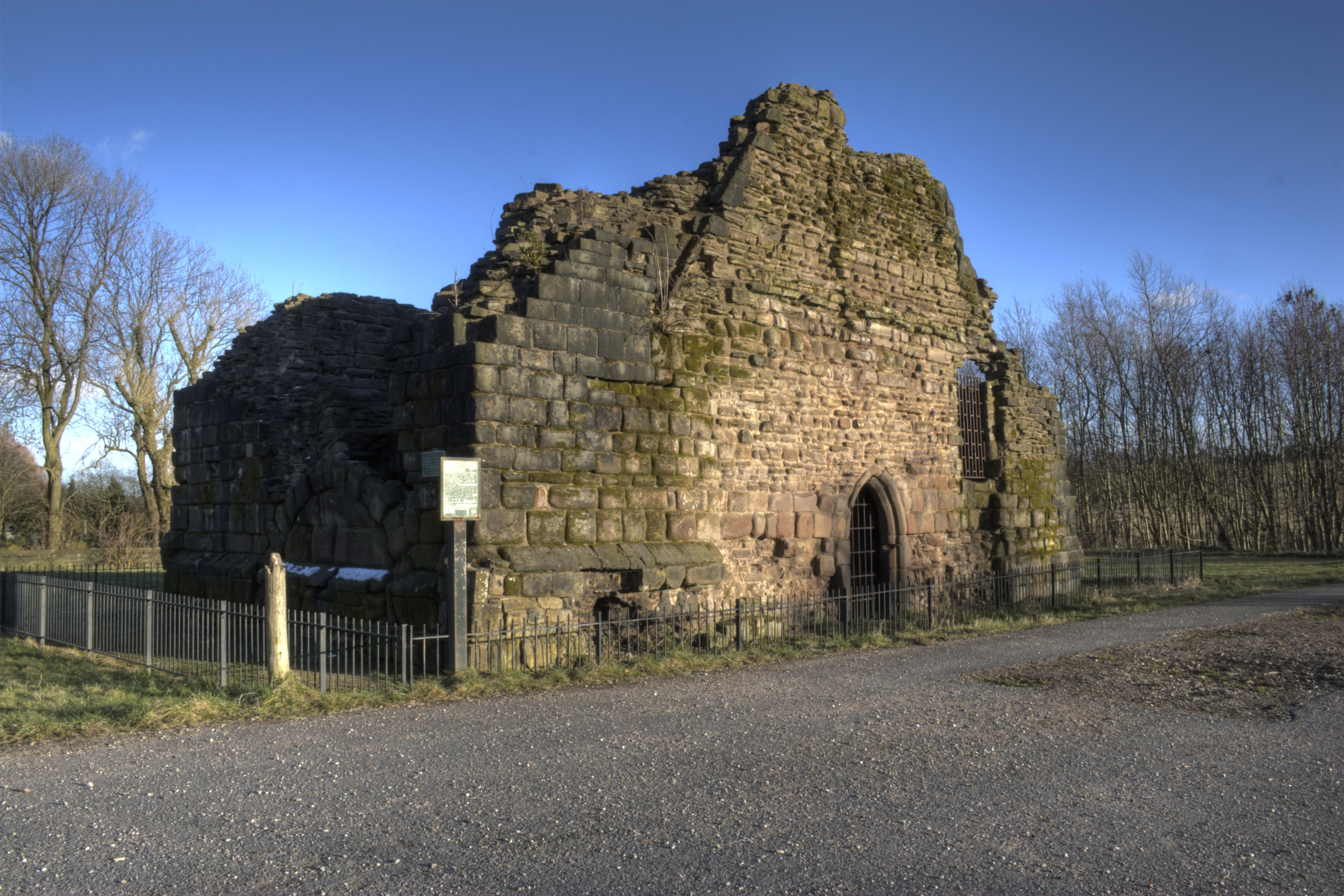
The standing remains of Radcliffe Tower

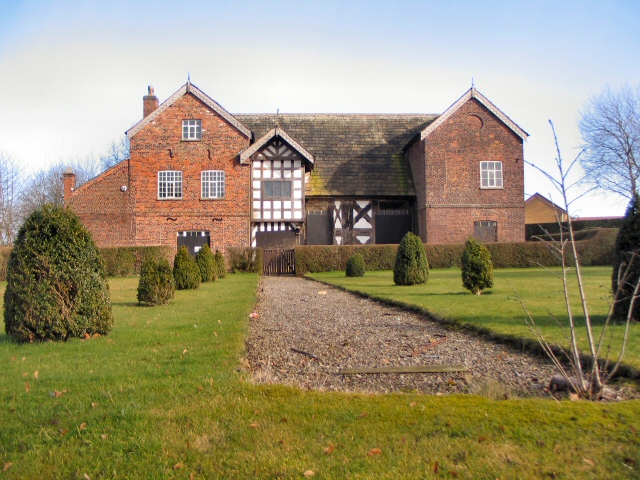
The 14th-century Baguley Hall, in Baguley is also a Grade I listed building

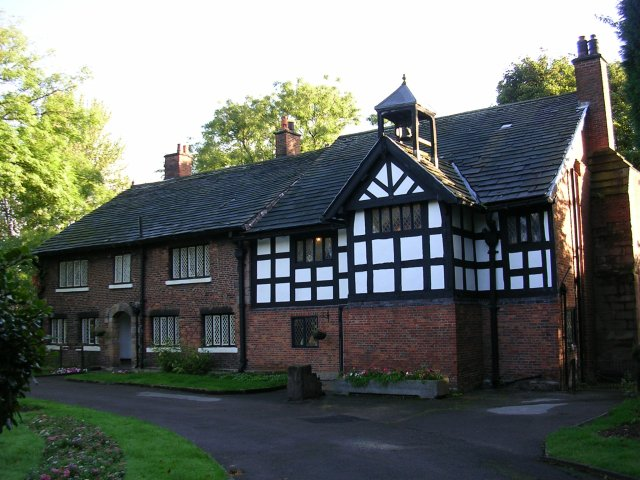
Clayton Hall, in Clayton is also a Grade II* listed building

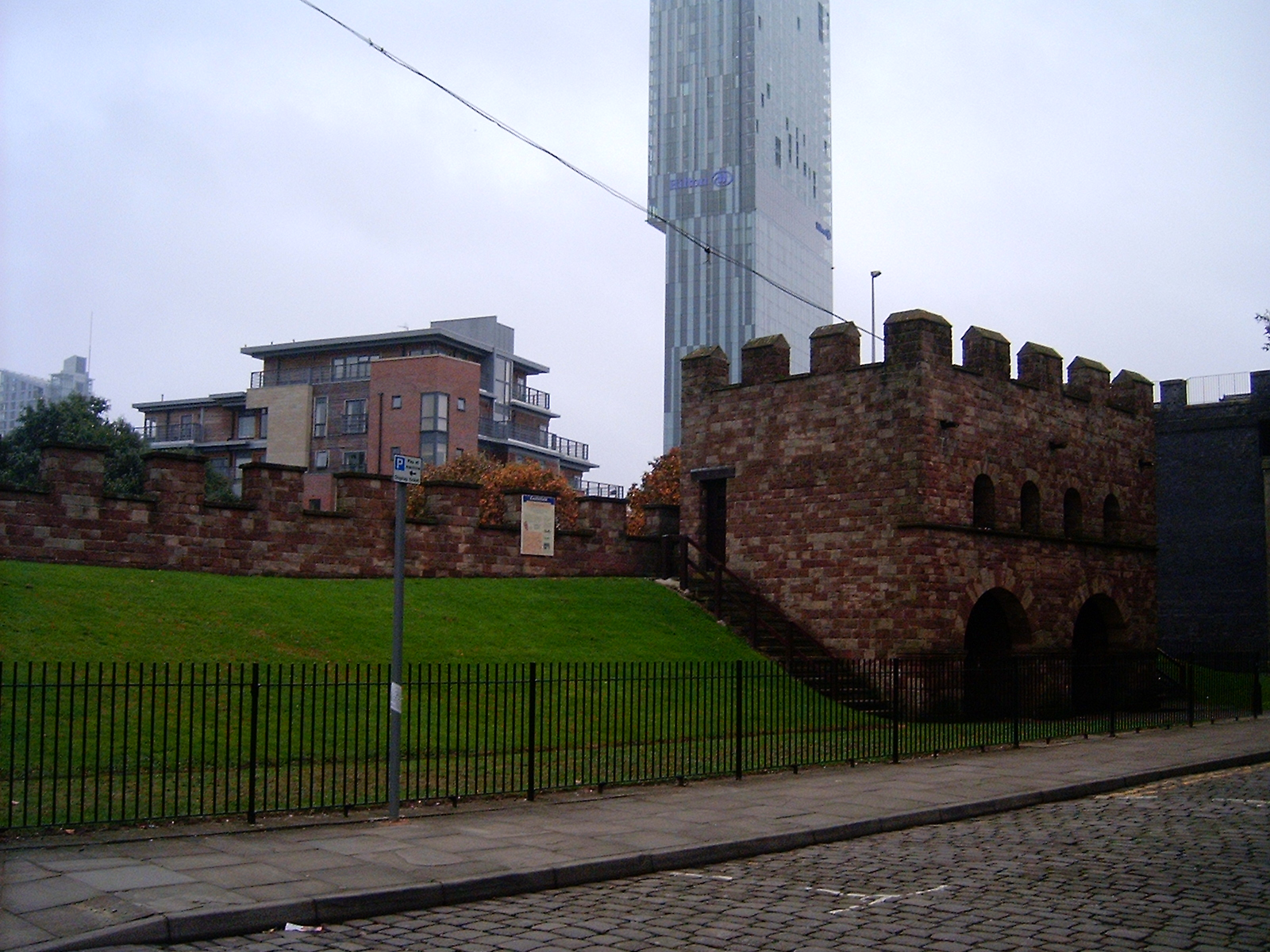
A reconstructed section of the wall of Mamucium fort

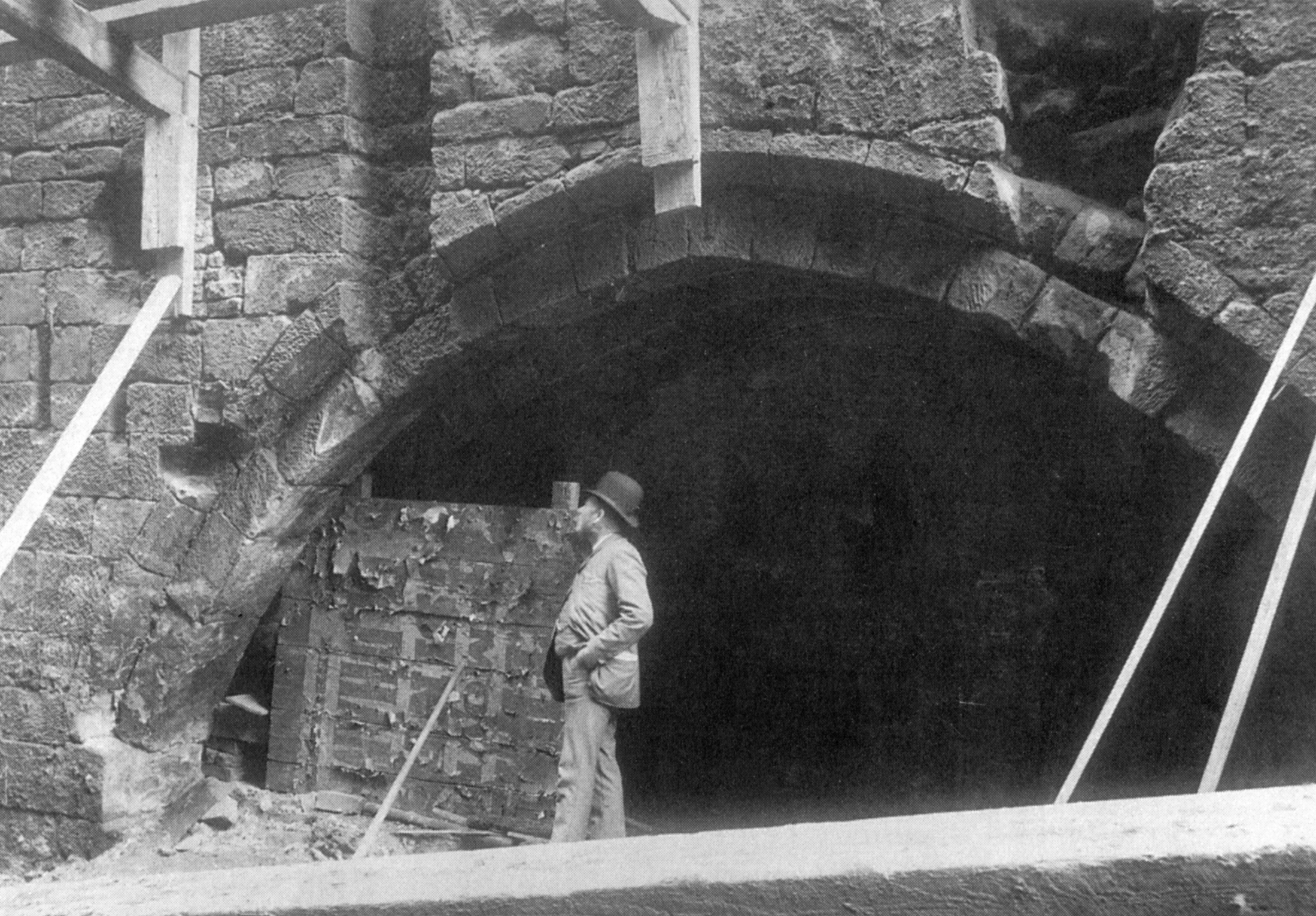
Hanging Bridge was excavated in 1892

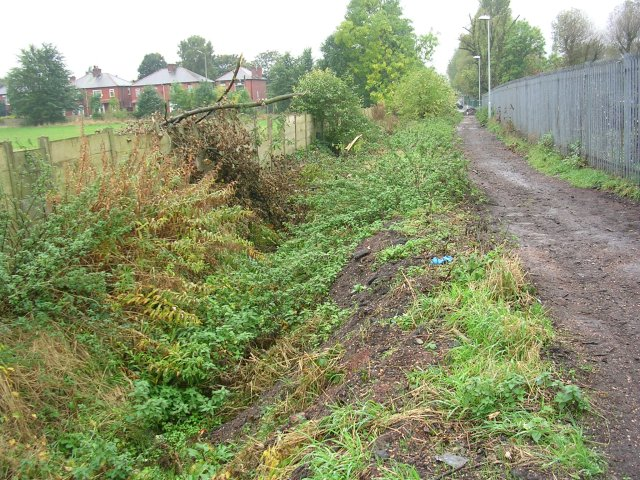
Looking west along Nico Ditch, near Levenshulme

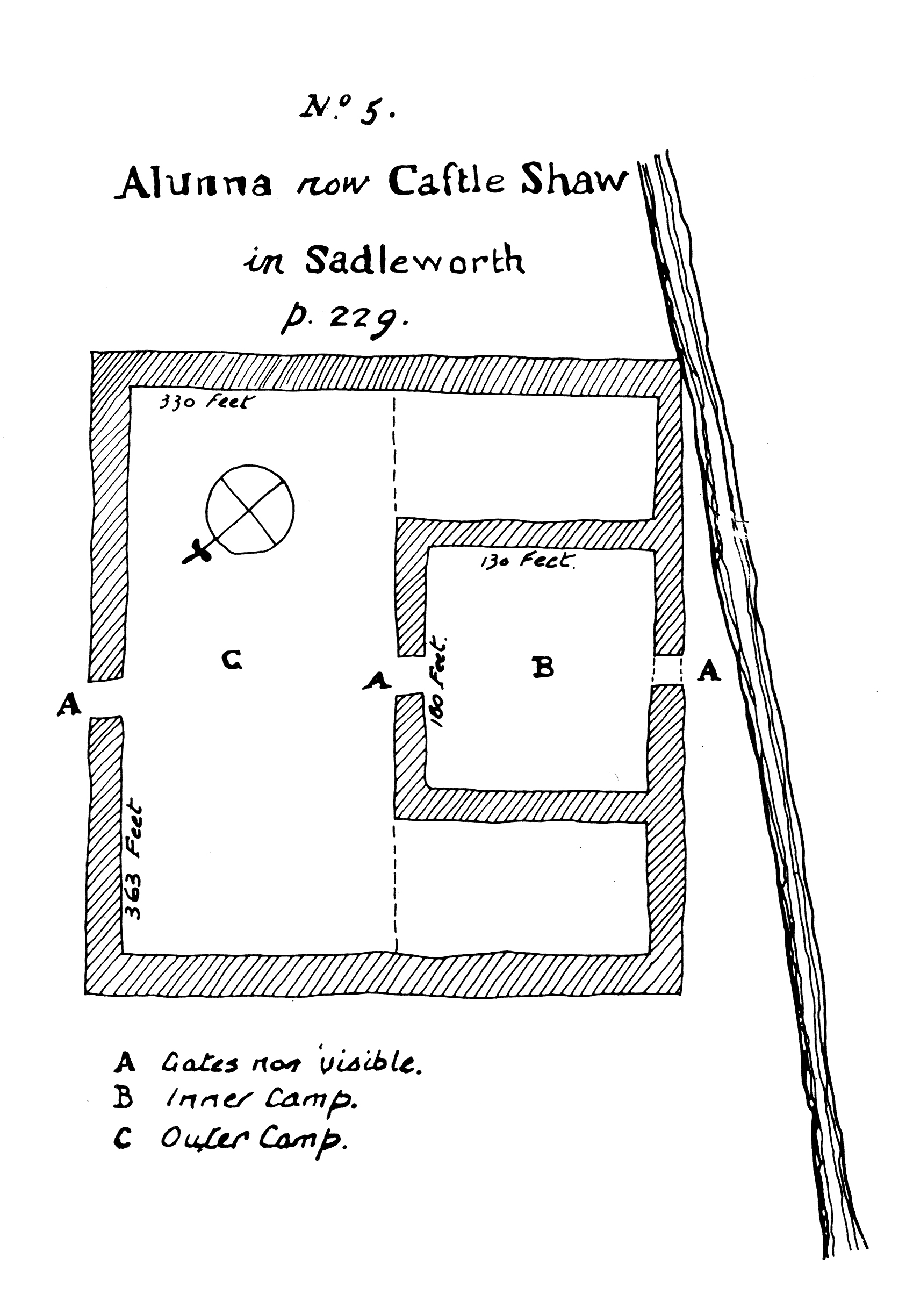
A plan of Castleshaw drawn by Thomas Percival in 1752 showing the fort and the later fortlet

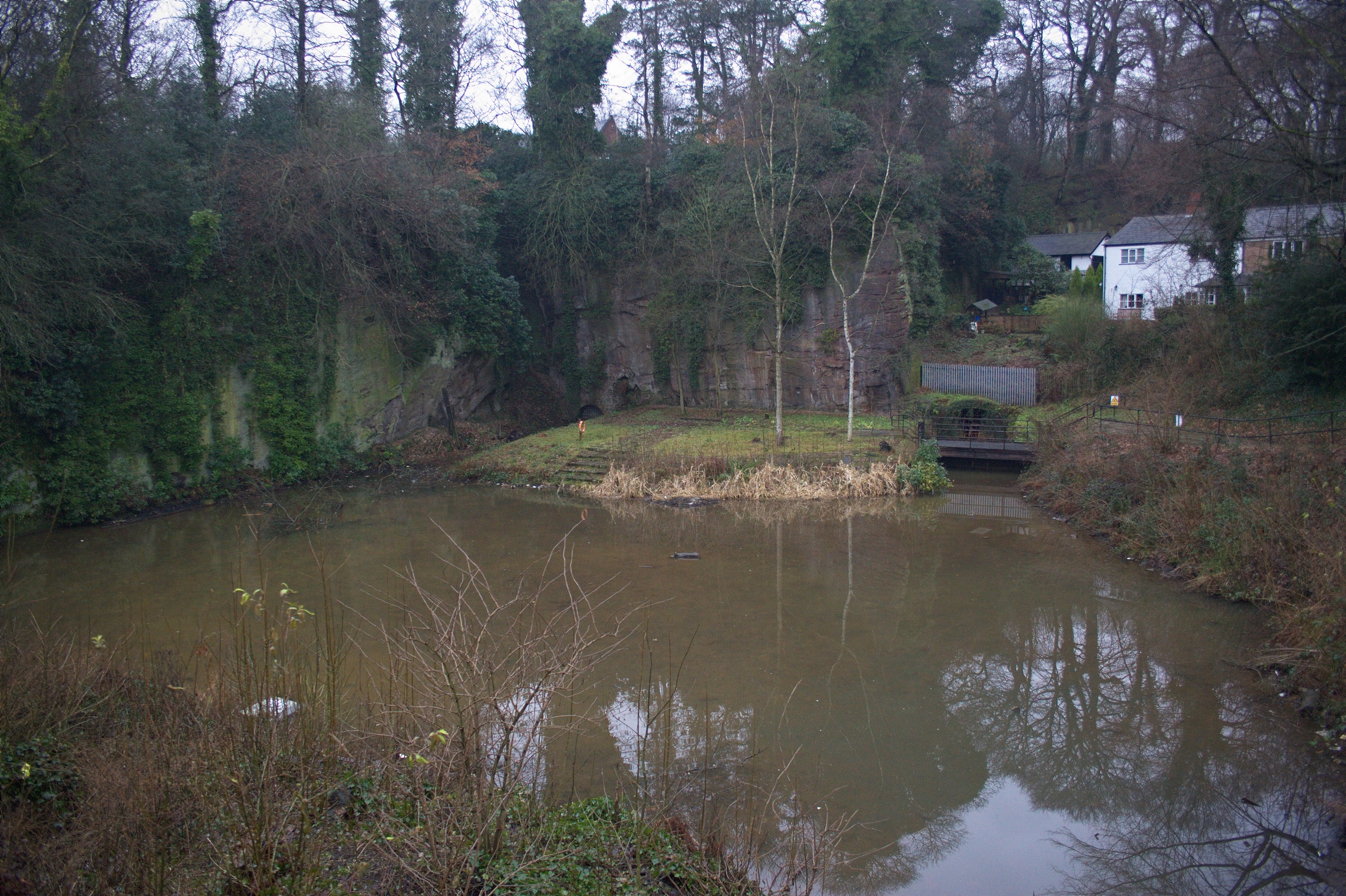
Worsley Delph

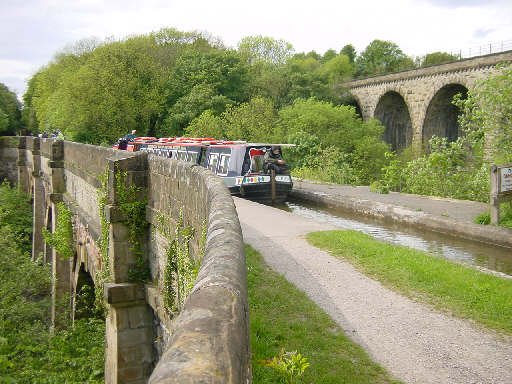
The Marple Aqueduct crossing the River Goyt

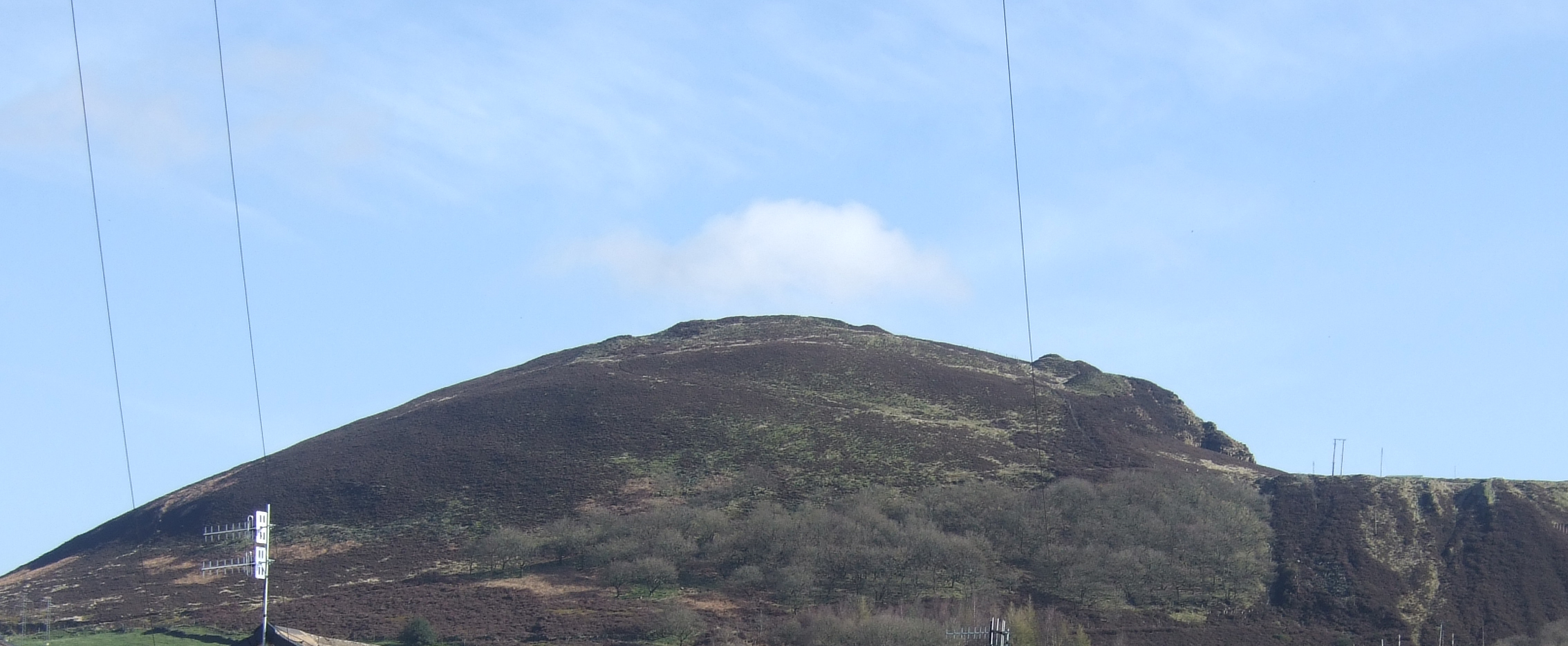
View of Buckton Castle from below

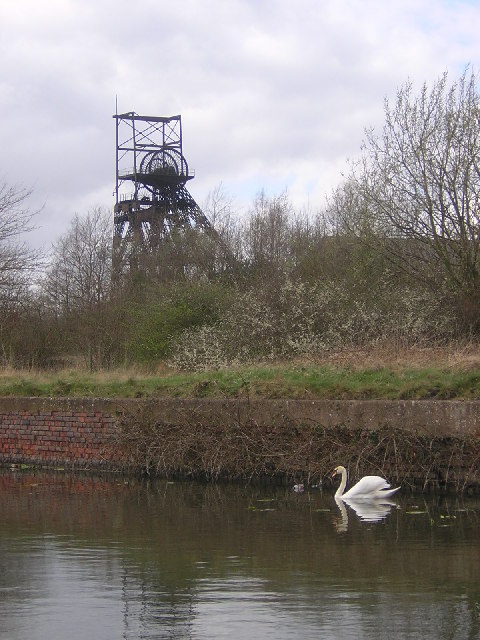
Astley Green Colliery's pithead, viewed from across the Bridgewater Canal

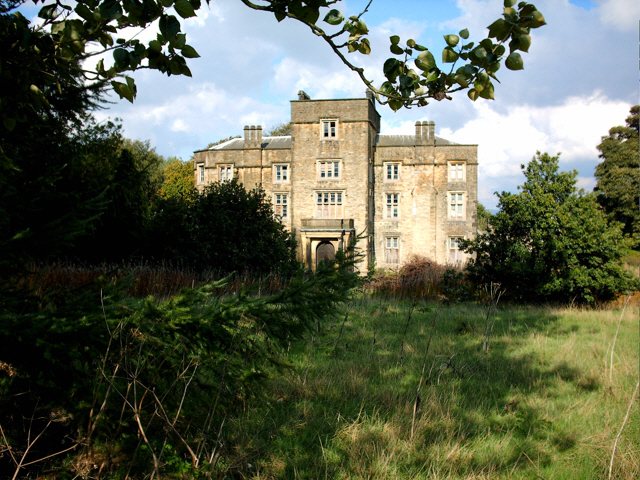
Winstanley Hall, a Tudor house, is also a Grade II* listed building

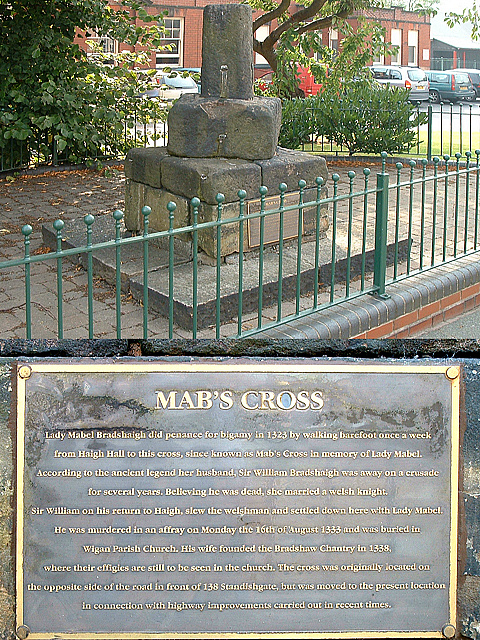
Mab's Cross is a Grade II* listed building

== See also ==
- Architecture of Manchester
- Castles in Greater Manchester
- Conservation in the United Kingdom
- Grade I listed buildings in Greater Manchester
- Grade II* listed buildings in Greater Manchester

== Notes ==
^{A} Most references are to one main body of sources: Pastscape which is funded by English Heritage and has information on nearly 400,000 archaeological sites and buildings in England.

"The information on PastScape is derived from the National Monuments Record database which holds records on the architectural and archaeological heritage of England. The National Monuments Record is the public archive of English Heritage."

^{B} Nico Ditch is a linear earthwork that runs for about 6 miles (9.7 km) generally east to west. It forms part of the Manchester–Tameside border and the Manchester–Stockport border. It passes through Tameside and Manchester and extends into Trafford as far as Stretford. A 135 m (443 ft) long stretch of the ditch in Platt Fields is protected.
