= Mellor hill fort =

Prehistoric site in North West England

- Location within Greater Manchester

General information
- Architectural style: Iron Age
- Location: Mellor, Greater Manchester, England
- Coordinates: 53.396926°N 2.027073°W

Technical details
- Size: c. 1 ha (2.5 acres) (inner enclosure)

Mellor hill fort is a prehistoric site in North West England dating from the British Iron Age – about 800 BC to 100 AD. Situated on a hill in Mellor, Greater Manchester, on the western edge of the Peak District, the hill fort overlooks the Cheshire Plain. Although the settlement was founded during the Iron Age, evidence exists of activity on the site as far back as 8,000 BC; during the Bronze Age the hill may have been an area where funerary practices were performed. Artefacts such as a Bronze Age amber necklace indicate the site was high status and that its residents took part in long-distance trade. The settlement was occupied into the Roman period. After the site was abandoned, probably in the 4th century, it was forgotten until its rediscovery in the 1990s.

== Location ==
Mellor lies on the western edge of the Peak District in the Metropolitan Borough of Stockport. At grid reference SJ9820088929, the known site of the Iron Age settlement in Mellor is partially under St Thomas Church and extends into the gardens of several nearby houses. It is on a spur about 220 metres (720 ft) above sea level, between two valleys that drop steeply away and run west where the two small streams in the valleys meet the River Goyt, approximately 100 metres (330 ft) above sea level. The site commands views of the Cheshire Plain and Alderley Edge to the south and the range of hills to the north. Although there are higher points locally, the site has access to a water supply and the river valleys, and there is flat land to the west which could have been used agriculturally.

== Background ==
Until the 19th century little was known about hill forts; none had been excavated and their original purpose had long been forgotten. In the medieval period their origin was ascribed to various iconic figures such as Julius Caesar, King Arthur, King Alfred, the Danes, and even giants. By the 18th century it was thought that hill forts were Roman in origin. Opinion changed again in the 19th century following a large-scale investigation by Augustus Pitt-Rivers, who concluded that hill forts were built during the Iron Age.

The study of hill forts was popular in the 19th century, with a revival in the 20th century due to excavations at Danebury. However, it was not until the 1990s that the settlement at Mellor was discovered; the site had a lack of tell-tale earthworks, such as a circular ditch (which would indicate ancient activity). Excavations began in 1998 where unusual marks had been noted in 1995 during a drought. Instead of the medieval ditch the marks were thought to denote, the ditch of an Iron Age hill fort was revealed. Before these excavations began, relatively little was known about the prehistory of the Stockport area before about 1,200 BC. It was generally thought that the areas of Marple and Mellor had been mostly untouched by prehistoric human activity, including during the Romano-British period. Little is known about Iron Age activity in North West England as pottery is rare on the sites excavated in the region, and there is a dearth of settlement sites. Of the more than 1,300 hill forts found in England, relatively few are in the northwest. The paucity of known sites led archaeologist Colin Haselgrove to describe the region as a "black hole" for the Iron Age. Mellor is the only hill fort in Greater Manchester, and one of four known Iron Age settlement sites in the county.

== History ==
There is evidence of human activity on the site pre-dating the Iron Age, as far back as 8,000–6,000 BC. During this period Mellor may have been a knap site where flint tools were produced, and also may have been a seasonal camp. Over 200 lithics have been recovered and range from the early to the late Mesolithic. A high proportion of the flints are bladed tools, indicating that the people who produced them were hunter gatherers. Bronze Age artefacts are rare on the site, and there is no definitive indication of habitation in this period. Despite this, it is likely that the long-term habitation of the site had its roots in the late Bronze Age.

A flint dagger was discovered on the site. This type of artefact is rare in Greater Manchester; the nearest comparable site is in Saddleworth. Its presence has been taken as an indication that during the Bronze Age the site was used for funerary practices. Many of the hills near Mellor are surmounted by Bronze Age funerary monuments such as Brown Low, Shaw Cairn, and Werneth Low, supporting the possibility that Mellor was also a funerary site. Also dating from the Bronze Age and found at Shaw Cairn was a rare high-status amber necklace. Amber does not occur naturally in Britain – the nearest source is the Baltic. It would have been traded over long distances. The necklace was discovered as part of a 4,000‑year‑old burial.

Bronze Age amber necklace discovered at nearby Shaw Cairn in 2008

The hill fort was built in and used throughout the Iron Age, as demonstrated by finds from the site which span the period. Occupants lived in roundhouses, and habitation of the site was spread over a long period. In common with many other hill forts, the site was probably divided into separate areas for habitation, industry, and agricultural activities such as storage, although the layout of these areas changed over time. Excavations indicate that the area enclosed by the inner ditch was used mainly for habitation, while the area between the inner and outer ditches was agricultural. The separation was not necessarily fixed as some of the outer area shows signs that it was used as a living space.

The Roman fort of Melandra is nearby. Fragments of glass, possibly Roman in origin, and shards of pottery which date to the 1st and 2nd centuries AD, indicate the site was used in the Romano-British period. However no Roman structures have been discovered, and the nature of Roman activity at the site is a source of speculation. The position of the hilltop indicate that it was easily defended; however, local finds indicate it was a high-status settlement rather than a military outpost unless a similar feature was located nearby. One reason that Roman structures have not been identified is that the Romano-British inhabitants may have used roundhouses rather than buildings of a typically rectilinear Roman style. This would make them more difficult to differentiate from Iron Age roundhouses and would imply a continuation of local culture rather than an imposition of Roman style. It is also possible that Romans simply influenced the area, rather than actively occupying the site. The site was later abandoned and forgotten until its rediscovery in the 1990s.

== Investigation ==
With sites such as Danebury where there is no modern habitation or built environment, extensive excavations can be undertaken to establish the general layout. The modern settlement of Mellor extends over the Iron Age hill fort, which restricts archaeological investigation. A geophysical survey was performed to establish the extent of the settlement; methods such as magnetometry and ground-penetrating radar were successful in identifying the eastern and northern sections of the ditch encircling the site. Excavations have been concentrated around the Old Vicarage. By 2004 there were 43 trenches, 14 trial trenches, and 17 test pits. The investigation of the site has revealed two ditches. While the external ditch encloses a larger area, it has smaller dimensions than the internal ditch.

The chronological relation between the two ditches is uncertain. The internal ditch has been cut into the sandstone bedrock and is 4 m (13 ft) wide and 2.1 m (6 ft 11 in) deep; there was a palisade 3.25 m (11 ft) beyond the inner edge of the ditch. At some point, part of the ditch was refilled and a posthole inserted into it, possibly relating to a gateway. Artefacts recovered from the ditch indicate that the inhabitants of the site had links with salt-producing communities in lowland Cheshire. The Very Coarse Pottery (VCP) which was used to contain the salt at Mellor is similar to fragments recovered from the Iron Age site at Beeston Castle. A layer of charcoal has been radiocarbon dated to 830–190 BC. The latest deposits in the ditch include hundreds of fragments of Roman pottery dating from the 1st to 4th centuries, bronze Roman brooches, and Roman nails.

The outer ditch is 1.5 m (4 ft 11 in) wide and 1.4 m (4 ft 7 in) deep, and like the inner ditch was cut in the local bedrock. A rare Iron Age pot was recovered from the outer ditch, with 125 shards found. The material used to make the pot originated about 15 to 20 km (9 to 12 mi) away in Castleton, Derbyshire. The pot was found in one of the earliest contexts in the ditch, and dates to the Iron Age. It was probably deliberately placed at the bottom of the ditch as part of a ritual after a significant event such as digging the ditch. While the inner ditch did have a palisade, neither ditch had a bank associated with it.

The archaeological excavations that have been undertaken since 1998 are funded by Stockport Metropolitan Borough Council and grants from the Heritage Lottery Fund, and have received news coverage. The site is used as a training excavation for students and a community dig to introduce people to ancient history, with the participation of Mellor Archaeological Trust. In 2002, students from Ridge Danyers Sixth Form College built a replica roundhouse that is still standing on the site. Many of the artefacts discovered at Mellor during the excavations are on permanent display at Stockport Museum. The site is open to the public annually, in the first week of September, so that people can view the work done over the past season of digging.

== See also ==
- Brown Low – an Early Bronze Age funerary monument 2 km (1 mi) north of Mellor
- Castlesteads, Greater Manchester – an Iron Age promontory fort in Bury
- Mam Tor – Iron Age hill fort about 20 mi (32 km) away in Derbyshire
