= Ammon Wrigley =

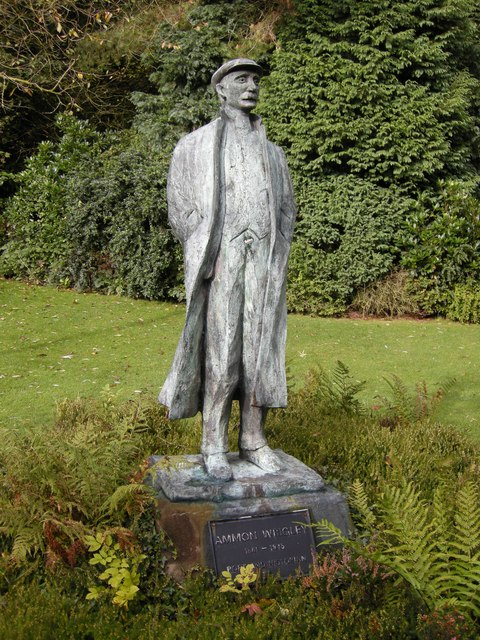
Statue of Ammon Wrigley in Uppermill village

Ammon Wrigley (1861-1946) was an English poet and local historian from Saddleworth, which is historically in the West Riding of Yorkshire (now administered as part of the Metropolitan Borough of Oldham, Greater Manchester).

== Biography ==
Wrigley was born at Oxhey, Denshaw, Saddleworth, on 10 October 1861, in a poor working family. His father was a mill worker, and he had one younger brother, Charles. The family moved to Castleshaw and he attended school there but started half-time mill work at the age of nine, and worked in local woolen mills all his life. He married Emily Hudson in 1890 and died on 31 August 1946. At his request his ashes were scattered around the Dinner Stone, a rock formation on Standedge, on the moors above Saddleworth.

== Work ==
Wrigley published many works of poetry and local history. His first financially successful publication was in 1910. His second book in 1912 was supported by public subscription and on its publication he was presented with a cheque for 100 guineas (£105) and his wife received a watch.

He illustrated some of his works, and Saddleworth Museum holds two of his seascapes and several other paintings and drawings.

The poet Glyn Hughes described Wrigley as "didactic and sentimental", and in discussing Hughes' book William Atkins refers to Wrigley as "Saddleworth's poet laureate" and says of him that he "saw the moor as an enemy to be vanquished – a glowering menace, forever threatening to retake the cultivated land".

== Legacy ==
The Ammon Wrigley Fellowship Society was formed on 27 August 1931 at a meeting held in Austerlands, to honour the poet during his lifetime. It held meetings until 1982, and its papers are held by Saddleworth Museum.

Wrigley's manuscripts and related papers, including papers of the Ammon Wrigley Fellowship, are held by Saddleworth Museum.

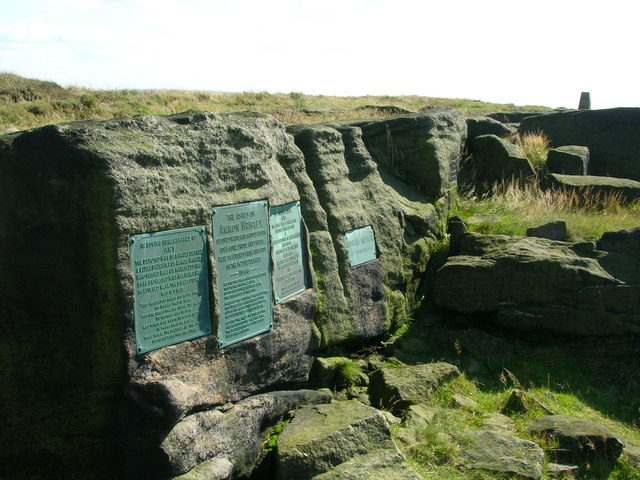
Plaques on Millstone Edge where Wrigley's ashes were scattered

He is commemorated by a bronze statue in Uppermill by Manchester sculptor James Collins, commissioned as part of the 1991 Saddleworth Festival for the Arts . The bronze was cast by "Benin Bronze" art foundry in Wigan, 1989-90. The foundry no longer operates. There are also commemorative plaques on the rocks of Millstone Edge, Standedge, where his ashes were scattered. The Pennine Way National Trail passes this spot, which is near a trig point at an elevation of 1470 ft (448m). Alfred Wainwright in his 1968 Pennine Way Companion describes Ammon Wrigley as a "much-revered writer and poet whose love of the country around his native Saddleworth shone in all his works" and mentions an annual commemorative ceremony at the memorial stone; he includes a sketch of "The Ammon Wrigley Memorial Stone" showing the plaques.

== Publications ==
Works by Wrigley held in national and university libraries and listed in Copac include:

- Saddleworth Superstitions and Folk Customs (1909, Oldham: W. E. Clegg)
- Saddleworth: its Prehistoric Remains (1911, Oldham: Clegg)
- Songs of a Moorland Parish with prose sketches: a collection of verse and prose, chiefly relating to the parish of Saddleworth. (1912, Saddleworth: Moore and Edwards, reprinted 1980 by Saddleworth Rotary Club)
- The Wind among the Heather. A book of the old dalesfolk, the old firesides, and the old inn corners of bygone Saddleworth (1916, Huddersfield: A. Jubb & Son; 1992 reprint ISBN 0951830309)
- Old Saddleworth Days and Other Sketches (1920, Oldham: W. E. Clegg)
- At the Sign of the Three Bonnie Lassies (1927, Saddleworth : Taylor & Clifton)
- O'er the Hills and Far Away (1931, Stalybridge: G. Whittaker & Sons)
- Those Were the Days (1937, Stalybridge: G. Whittaker & Sons)
- Songs of the Pennine Hills: a book of the open air (1938, Stalybridge)
- Saddleworth Chronological Notes from 1200 to 1900 (1940, Stalybridge : G. Whittaker & Sons; 1979 expanded edition published by George Kelsall as Annals of Saddleworth, from 1200 to 1900 ISBN 0950557722)
- Old Lancashire words and folk sayings, parish of Saddleworth (1940, Stalybridge : G. Whittaker & sons)
- Lancashire idylls (1942, London: George Allen & Unwin)
- Saddleworth for Roaming (1943, Stalybridge : G. Whittaker & Sons)
- Rakings up : an autobiography (1949, Rochdale: E. Wrigley) / Ammon Wrigley.
