= Baguley Hall =

Listed building in Greater Manchester, England

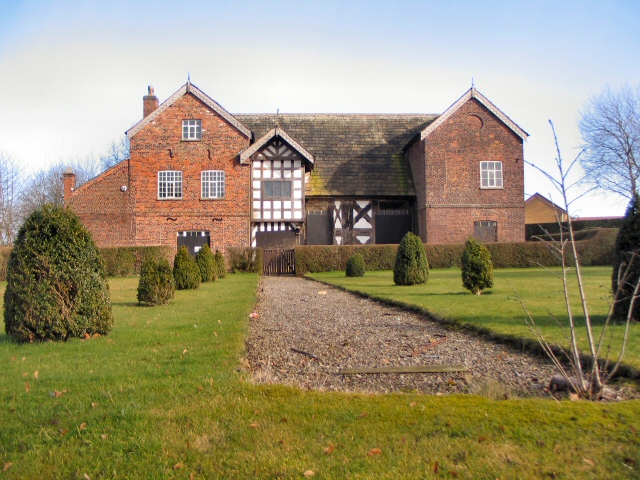
- Baguley Hall, near Manchester

- Location within Greater Manchester

General information
- Architectural style: Timber-framed
- Location: Baguley, Greater Manchester, England
- Coordinates: 53.395263°N 2.277872°W
- Construction started: 14th century
- Owner: Historic England

Design and construction
- Designations

Listed Building – Grade I
- Official name: Baguley Hall
- Designated: 25 February 1952
- Reference no.: 1291962

Baguley Hall is a 14th-century timber-framed building in Baguley, Greater Manchester, England.

A former country house, historically in Cheshire, it is now Grade I listed and a Scheduled Ancient Monument.

== History ==
Baguley Hall is believed to occupy the site of an earlier hall house dating back to the 11th or 12th century. Archaeological excavations in the 1980s uncovered remains of an aisled timber hall from that period.

The current hall was constructed in the early 14th century by Sir William de Baguley, and possibly completed by his descendants, including Sir William Legh. Built entirely of timber with wattle and daub walls, it is considered one of the oldest surviving timber great halls in England, notable for its unusually large timbers.

In the 15th century, a timber-framed north wing was added, replacing earlier tithe barns. The 16th century saw the addition of a timber-framed porch on the west side. A brick-built south wing replaced an earlier chamber block in the late 17th century, and the north wing was rebuilt in brick during the 18th century. The west porch was partially rebuilt in the 19th century.

By the early 20th century, the hall was repurposed as a farm building and became locally known as Maher's Farm during World War II, noted for vegetable cultivation. Around 1948, the surrounding estate was developed into the Wythenshawe area, leading to the hall's abandonment and overgrowth, later cleared by volunteers.

Restoration efforts began in the 1970s, including timber treatment under a protective corrugated iron shed. As of April 2013, the hall remained closed to the public, though its grounds were maintained. In May 2024, Historic England listed the hall for sale.

== Ownership ==
Baguley Hall was in the possession of the de Baguleys and later the Legh family for about 400 years. Sir William de Baguley's daughter, Isabel, married Sir John Legh of Booths, near Knutsford. Her son, Sir William Legh, succeeded and the estate remained in the possession of the Leghs until the latter part of the 17th century. The last male heir was Edward Legh who married Eleanor, daughter of William Tatton of Wythenshawe Hall. They had three daughters and Baguley was leased to the Viscounts Allen until 1749 when the estate was bought by Joseph Jackson of Rostherne, whose family married into the Leighs of West Hall, High Legh. Jackson left it in his will to the Revd Millington Massey from whom it was inherited by his daughter, before being conveyed by the trustees of her marriage settlement to Thomas William Tatton, via his son Thomas Egerton Tatton to Robert Henry Grenville Tatton.

The hall was bought by Manchester Corporation in 1926. Since 1968, the building has been owned by HM Government. The Ministry of Works initiated the 1971 to 1982 restoration program. The hall is currently under the guardianship of the Department for Culture, Media and Sport. The structure and grounds are maintained by English Heritage. As of 2024, the hall is listed on Historic England's Heritage at Risk Register, rating its condition as "poor". In May 2024, owner Historic England invited offers to buy the freehold or a leasehold.

== See also ==
- Baguley
- Grade I listed buildings in Greater Manchester
- Listed buildings in Manchester-M23
- Scheduled Monuments in Greater Manchester
