= Hanging Bridge =

Medieval bridge in Manchester, England

Coordinates: 53.484482°N 2.243345°W

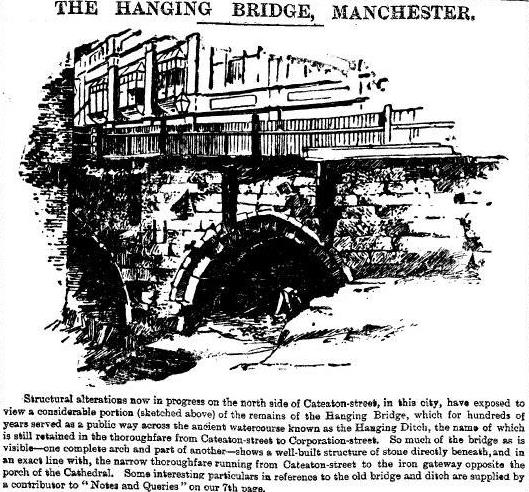
The Hanging Bridge in 1890 – from the Manchester Times newspaper

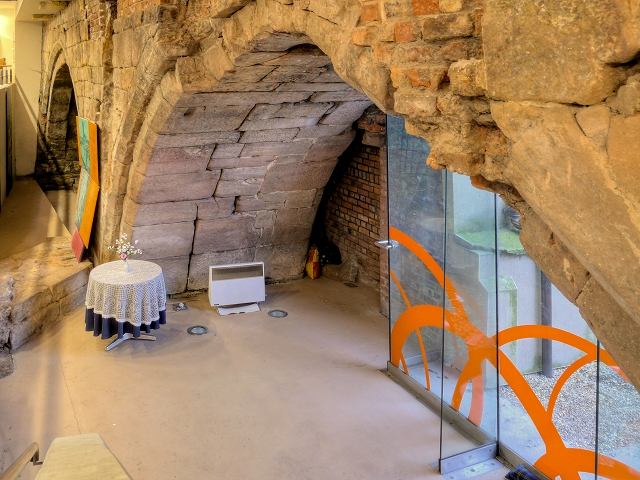
Hanging Bridge exposed arches inside Manchester Cathedral Visitor Centre building in 2014

Hanging Bridge is a medieval arched bridge spanning Hanging Ditch, a watercourse which connected the rivers Irk and Irwell in Manchester, England. It was built in 1421, replacing an earlier bridge at the same location. Eventually completely obscured by buildings over time, the bridge was rediscovered in the 1880s and the structure is now partially exposed. The bridge is listed as a Scheduled Ancient Monument.

== Hanging Ditch ==
Hanging Ditch was a natural post-glacial channel. A stream flowed through the ditch, from the Irk to the Irwell – possibly the lost River Dene, which gave its name to Deansgate. At its Irwell end, Hanging Ditch was 120 feet (37 m) wide and 40 feet (12 m) deep. The ditch formed part of the city's defences in medieval times. It has been speculated that Hanging Ditch may be of Roman origin, part of a defensive circuit between the rivers Irk and Irwell. The last known documentation of the ditch as an open watercourse was in 1682.

== Name ==
In 1343, an earlier bridge over the ditch was recorded with the name "Hengand Brigge". The Manchester court leet records refer to "Hengynge dyche" 1552. It has been speculated that "Hanging" may refer to a previous Roman drawbridge, a steep slope or elevated land, or a site of executions by hanging. The name may also derive from the Old English hen, meaning wild birds, and the Welsh gan, meaning between two hills.

Although the ditch was covered in 17th century, the thoroughfare in front of Manchester Corn Exchange which used to run alongside (or partially at a lower level inside) the ditch still bears the name "Hanging Ditch".

== Construction and usage ==
The first reference to a bridge at this location, called Hengand Brigge, was in 1343. The present structure was built in 1421, possibly incorporating parts of the previous bridge, using sandstone from Collyhurst. Material taken from Manchester's Roman fort may also have been used in its construction. The bridge has two four-centred arches, and is 108 feet (33 m) long and 9 feet (2.7 m) wide.

The bridge linked the parish church (Now Manchester Cathedral) with the medieval city centre. It previously led directly into the churchyard, and in 1554 the court leet appointed guards to prevent people using it as a shortcut for driving livestock. Hanging Ditch was also used as a rubbish dump; archaeologists discovered leather, wood, bone, metalwork and pottery in the channel dating from between the 13th and the early 15th centuries. The practice continued in the 16th century, in spite of edicts forbidding it in 1561 and 1663. Some adjoining residents had privies that overhung and discharged directly into the ditch.

== Covering ==
In 1600, the Hanging Ditch was condemned as an insanitary open sewer, and in the following years the ditch was culverted and the bridge buried and built over. A directory published in 1772 recorded that nine houses had been built along the line of the bridge, suggesting that it may have been covered over during the first phase of Manchester's town planning, some time in the 1770s.

== Excavation ==
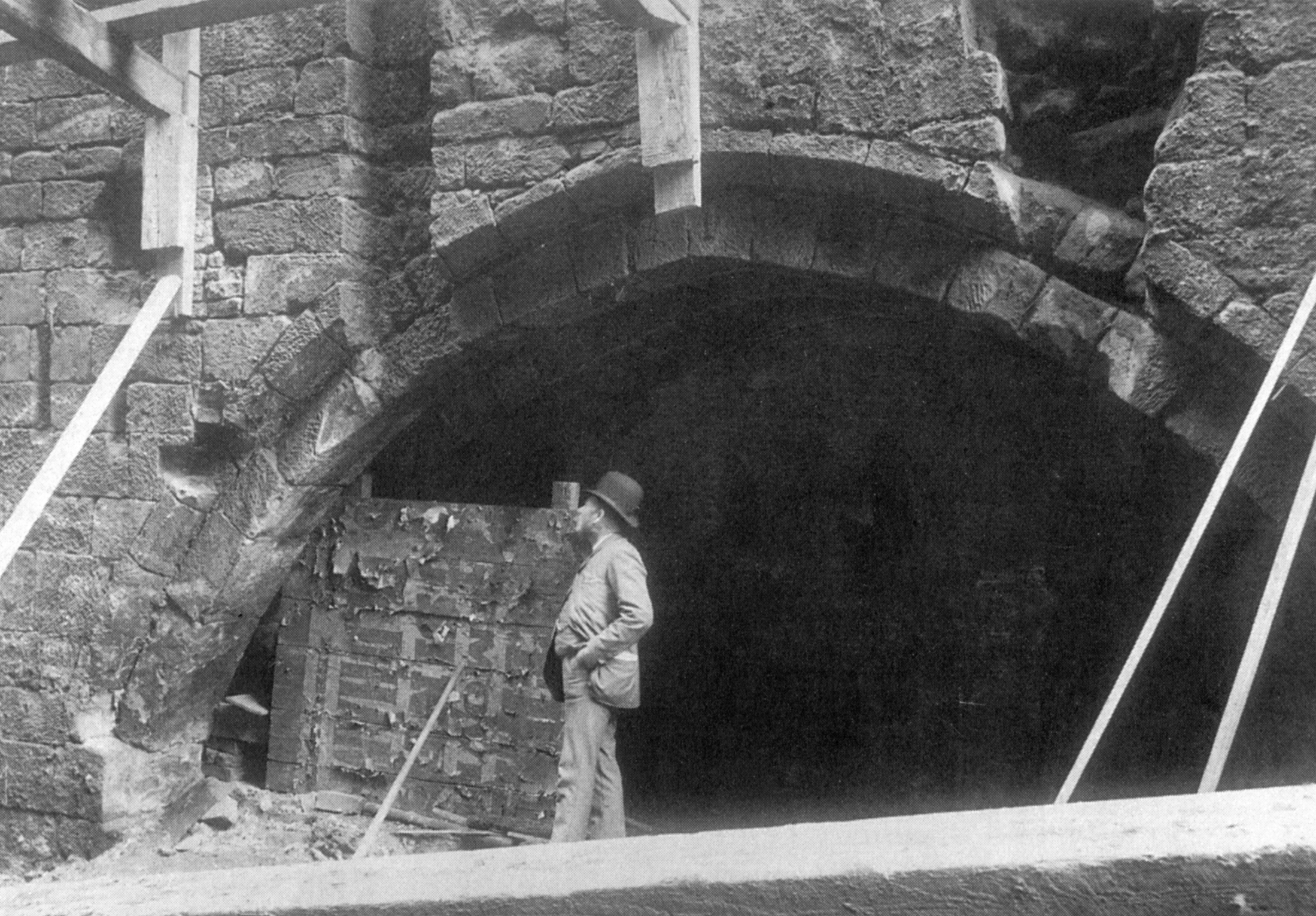
The Hanging Bridge was excavated in 1892

The bridge was presumed lost until it was rediscovered in 1880 during demolition for the building of Hanging Bridge Chambers, now part of the Cathedral Visitor Centre. The site was subsequently excavated and the bridge was put on display. In three months it had about 32,000 paying visitors. It was once again covered up during the Victorian expansion of Manchester.

More than 100 years later it was uncovered again. The site was excavated and studied by archaeologists from the University of Manchester in 1997. Following restoration work, Hanging Bridge went on display in 2002 as a main attraction of Manchester Cathedral's newly built visitor centre.

== Present day ==
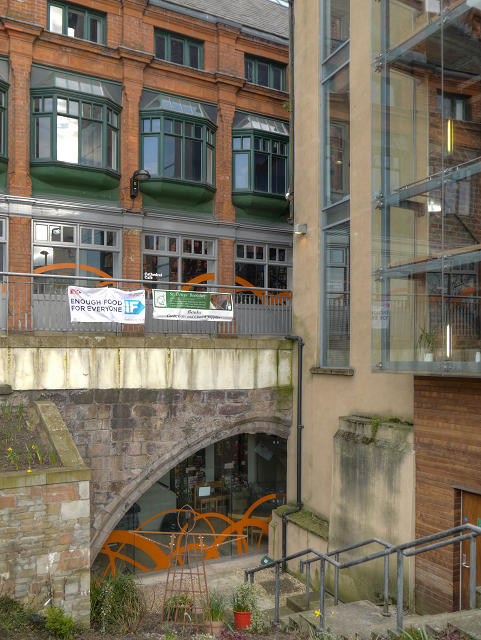
The only part of Hanging Bridge visible from outside, located under Hanging Bridge passageway and part of the Cathedral Visitor Centre building

Today the bridge structure is still largely hidden by buildings built on either side of the bridge, though the passageway over the arches is still in use and retains the name "Hanging Bridge". The two exposed arches of the bridge are part of the basement of Manchester Cathedral Visitor Centre and the monument was open to the public for free. The room containing the bridge was used by a theological bookshop from 2011 to 2018. The space closed to the public in 2018 for renovation. As of February 2024, it is not openly accessible to visitors. From the outside it is possible to see part of one arch via a sunken garden.

The bridge is listed as a Scheduled Ancient Monument.

== See also ==
- History of Manchester
- Scheduled Monuments in Greater Manchester
