= Mab's Cross =

Stone cross in Wigan, England

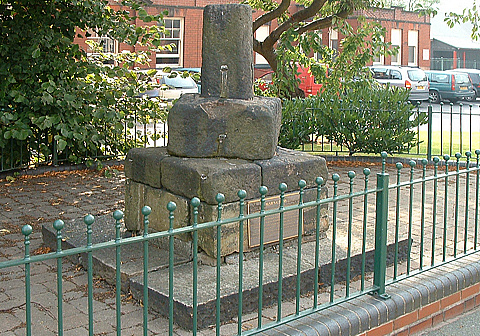
- Mab's Cross in 2005

- Location within Greater Manchester

General information
- Location: Wigan, Greater Manchester, England
- Coordinates: 53.55139°N 2.62745°W
- Completed: 13th century

Design and construction
- Designations

Listed Building – Grade II*
- Official name: Mabs Cross
- Designated: 10 July 1983
- Reference no.: 1384526

Mab's Cross, in Wigan, Greater Manchester, England, is a stone cross probably dating from the 13th century with its first recorded mention taking place in 1277. It is one of four stone crosses originally used as waymarkers along the medieval route from Wigan to Chorley. The cross no longer stands in its original position, having been moved across the road in 1922 as part of a road widening scheme.

== Structure ==
Mab's Cross is a scheduled ancient monument. The monument is the remains of a 13th-century boundary cross in Standishgate, Wigan. The cross was moved from a site on the opposite side of the road in the early-20th century. The Grade II* listed structure has a metre-square, 0.57-metre (1.9 ft) tall dressed plinth made of two courses of rectangular gritstone blocks. Mounted diagonally on the plinth is a large square cross base with the stump of the cross shaft set into it. On the plinth is a metal plaque relating the legend of Lady Mabel Bradshaigh.

== History ==
=== Legend ===
According to local legend, the cross is named after Lady Mabel Bradshaigh. The legend, recorded in a family history published in 1645, says that when Sir William Bradshaigh, her husband, failed to return from the crusades she married a Welsh knight. When Bradshaigh unexpectedly returned from a ten-year campaign, he murdered his wife's new husband in Newton-le-Willows while he was trying to escape. Lady Mabel did penance for her bigamy by walking from Haigh Hall to a stone cross in Wigan "bare footed and bare legged" once a week for as long as she lived. In another version of the legend, recorded by Norris of Speke in 1564, the Welsh knight is named as Henry Teuther, Sir William is absent for seven years on pilgrimage rather than a crusade and the penance involving the cross is not mentioned.

=== Reality ===
Sir William Bradshaigh and his wife were real people. Bradshaigh married Mabel Norris, the heiress of Blackrod and Haigh, in 1295. His absence was not due to a pilgrimage or crusades. On 1 November 1315, Adam Banastre, Henry de Lea, and Bradshaigh rebelled against Thomas, 2nd Earl of Lancaster in support of the king. The rebellion ended when the Deputy Sheriff of Lancashire defeated the rebels in battle north of the River Ribble. Bradshaigh escaped and was outlawed. In 1319 it was assumed he was dead, but he returned to his estates after the Earl of Lancaster's execution following defeat at the Battle of Boroughbridge on 16 March 1322. He was convicted and imprisoned in Kenilworth Castle, and later Pontefract Castle, before he was released in 1324. Rather than killing his wife's husband at Newton-le-Willows, it was Bradshaigh who was slain there on 16 August 1333 in a fight with members of the Radcliffe family. There is no evidence that Lady Mabel remarried, either before or after her husband's death, or that she did penance at the cross. After her husband's death she funded the creation of two chantry chapels at Blackrod and Wigan. A figure kneeling before a wayside cross featured on her tomb and within 50 years of her death Mab's Cross had taken on her name, suggesting there was a connection.

== See also ==
- Grade II* listed buildings in Greater Manchester
- Listed buildings in Wigan
- Scheduled Monuments in Greater Manchester
