= Baguley =

Area of south Manchester, England

Coordinates: 53.3990°N 2.2760°W

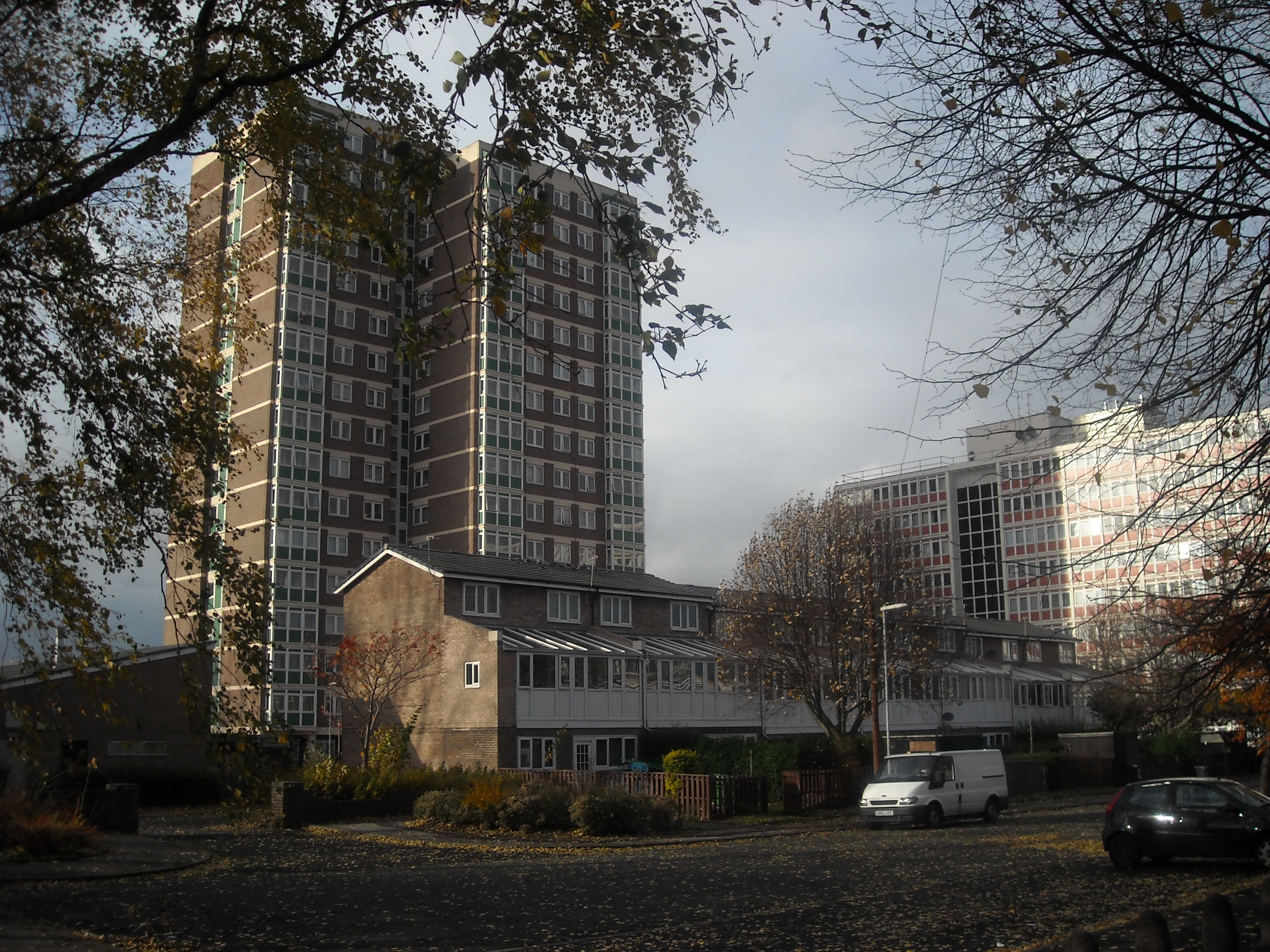
- Baguley social housing; the tower-block is Brookway Court

- Location within Greater Manchester
- Population: 14,794 (2011)
- OS grid reference: SJ816891
- Metropolitan borough: Manchester
- Metropolitan county: Greater Manchester
- Region: North West
- Country: England
- Sovereign state: United Kingdom
- Post town: MANCHESTER
- Postcode district: M23
- Dialling code: 0161
- Police: Greater Manchester
- Fire: Greater Manchester
- Ambulance: North West
- UK Parliament: Wythenshawe and Sale East
- Councillors: Munaver Rasul (Labour); Tracy Rawlins (Labour Co-op); Sian Astley (Reform)

Baguley (/ˈbæɡəli/ BAG-əl-ee) is an area and electoral ward of the city of Manchester, in Greater Manchester, England. The population at the 2011 census was 14,794.

The name Baguley is derived from the Old English words bagga (badger, or possibly referring simply to any woodland or hill-inhabiting wild animal) and lēah (clearing or meadow).

Historically in Cheshire, Baguley is mentioned in the Domesday Book of 1086. It was incorporated into Manchester in 1931.

== History ==
Baguley is recorded in the Domesday Book with 1.5 ploughlands (one ploughland being the amount of land that can be ploughed by a team of eight oxen). In 1086, the tenants in chief were Gilbert (the hunter) and Hamon de Masci. The Barons de Masci also had control over the manors of Dunham, Bowdon, Hale, Partington and Timperley.

In the 13th century, the Massey Family (Baron Hamon deMascy) was the main landlord in Northenden. Through marriage, the Massey family's land in Baguley passed to the Baguley Family, who built Baguley Hall in the 14th century.

Baguley Hall is a 14th-century timber-framed manor house that may have replaced an 11th- or 12th-century house.

The ownership of Baguley can be mapped through the ownership of Baguley Hall and its manor lands.

Most of Baguley was developed for housing after World War II as part of the Wythenshawe Estate, including many council houses and later tower blocks (a typical one shown at right is Brookway Court); Manchester City Council publications refer to Baguley as "one of Europe's biggest housing estates." However, much of the social housing has been sold off under the Right To Buy scheme and there are also several private housing developments in the area; parkland was provided from the start under the development plan.

== Administrative history ==
Baguley was a township and chapelry of Bowdon, one of the ancient parishes of the Bucklow Hundred of Cheshire. Under the Poor Law Amendment Act 1886, the township became a civil parish in its own right. On 1 April 1931, Manchester extended its boundaries south of the Mersey in to form Wythenshawe; Baguley was incorporated into the civil parish and County Borough of Manchester, along with neighbouring Northenden and Northen Etchells. In 1921, the parish had a population of 1325.

== Governance ==
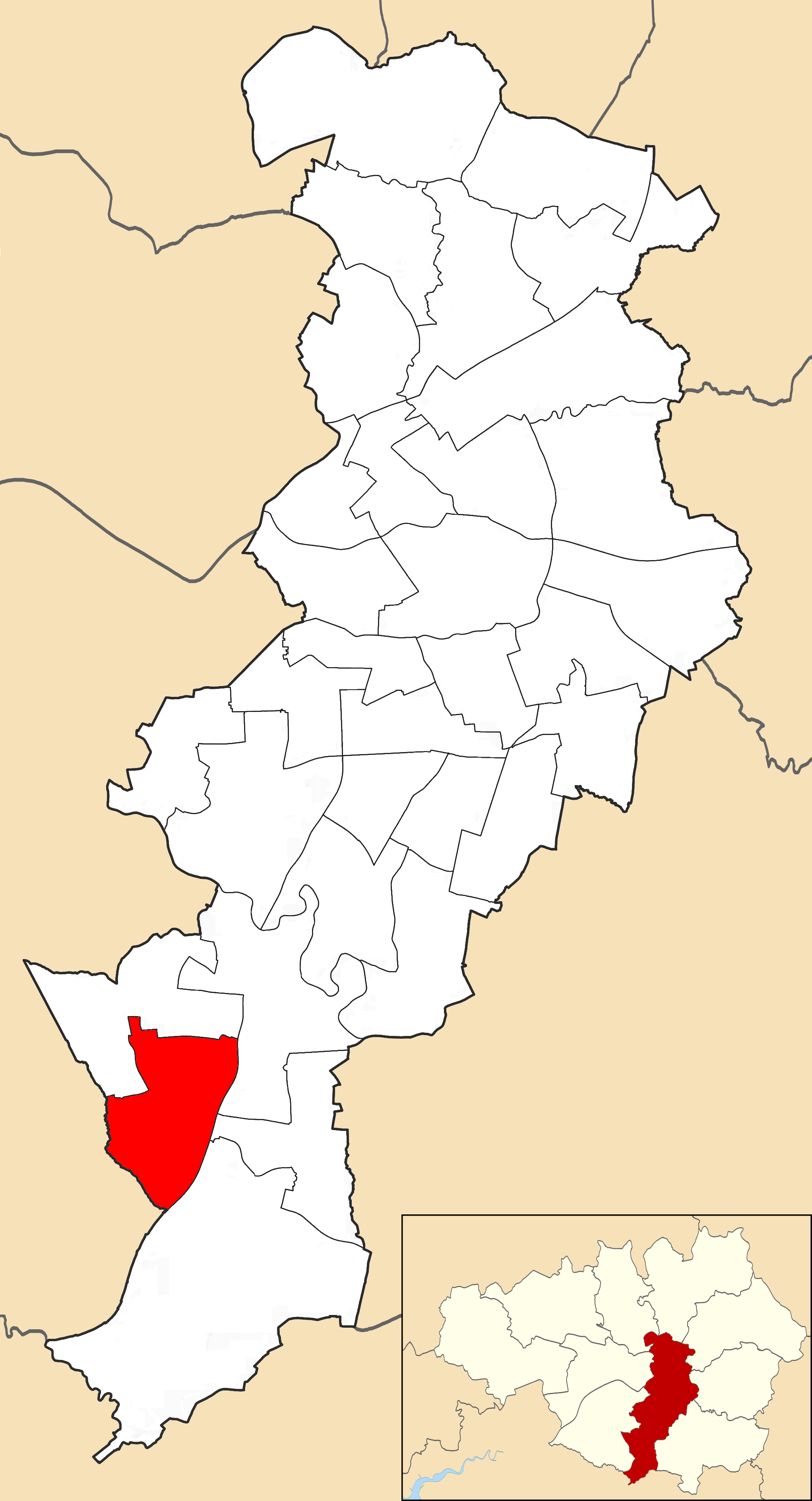
Baguley electoral ward within Manchester City Council

Baguley is part of the Wythenshawe and Sale East parliamentary constituency, which is currently represented at Westminster by Mike Kane MP.

Three councillors serve the ward: Munaver Rasul (Lab), Tracey Rawlins (Lab Co-op), and Sian Astley (Ref).

Election	Councillor	Councillor	Councillor
2018	Luke Raikes (Lab)	Tracy Rawlins (Lab Co-op)	Paul Andrews (Lab Co-op)
2019	Luke Raikes (Lab)	Tracy Rawlins (Labour Co-op)	Paul Andrews (Labour Co-op)
2021	Luke Raikes (Lab)	Tracy Rawlins (Labour Co-op)	Paul Andrews (Labour Co-op)
2022	Luke Raikes (Lab)	Tracy Rawlins (Labour Co-op)	Paul Andrews (Labour Co-op)
2023	Phil Brickell (Labour Co-op)	Tracy Rawlins (Labour Co-op)	Paul Andrews (Labour Co-op)
2024	Phil Brickell (Labour Co-op)	Tracy Rawlins (Labour Co-op)	Paul Andrews (Labour Co-op)
Sep 2024	Munaver Rasul (Lab)	Tracy Rawlins (Labour Co-op)	Paul Andrews (Labour Co-op)
2026	Munaver Rasul (Lab)	Tracy Rawlins (Labour Co-op)	Sian Astley (Ref)

indicates seat up for re-election. indicates seat won in by-election.

== Commerce ==
Baguley also includes the Roundthorn Industrial Estate, where several factories and businesses are located. This included a Habitat store which opened in the 1970s, but closed in 2011 when the company downsized and closed all of its stores outside London. In 1990, a large Tesco superstore opened in the area. Across the road from this is Brookway Retail Park, which is home to several stores including Aldi, B & M, Matalan, Pets at Home and Wickes.

== Transport ==
Baguley railway station was opened on 1 February 1866 and closed on 30 November 1964 during the Beeching cuts. It was served mostly by local trains operating between Stockport Tiviot Dale and Liverpool Central, and on a separate line from Stockport to Altrincham.

The line through the former station site is still used by Northern Trains' passenger services between Manchester Piccadilly, Stockport, Altrincham, Northwich and Chester.

== Public services ==
See also South Manchester University Hospital

Baguley is covered by the South Manchester Division of Greater Manchester Police.
