= Gidlow Hall =

Gidlow Hall is a scheduled ancient monument dating from 1574 in Aspull, in the Metropolitan Borough of Wigan, Greater Manchester. The great hall was the residence of the Gidlow family, whose members included Robert de Gidlow, freeholder of Aspull in 1291. Members of the family were recorded in the village until the 17th century. The hall, now situated amongst more modern farmhouses, is still surrounded by a moat. Although the building dates from 1574 (a datestone is retained, showing Thomas Gidlow's initials), the eastern extent and a porch was demolished in 1840. Parts of the hall which date from its original construction include masonry on the south front and east wall, a fireplace and a stair-tower at the rear. There is evidence of a previous screens passage.
