= Castlesteads, Greater Manchester =

Hillfort in Greater Manchester, England

Coordinates: 53.612875°N 2.306955°W

Map showing the location of Castlesteads within Greater Manchester.

Castlesteads is an Iron Age promontory fort, situated on the east bank of the River Irwell on a natural promontory in Bury, Greater Manchester (grid reference SD79691299). It is listed as a scheduled monument. Excavated pottery indicates the site was occupied between 200BC and 250AD.

== See also ==
- Scheduled Monuments in Greater Manchester
