= Brown Low =

Coordinates: 53.41509°N 2.019397°W

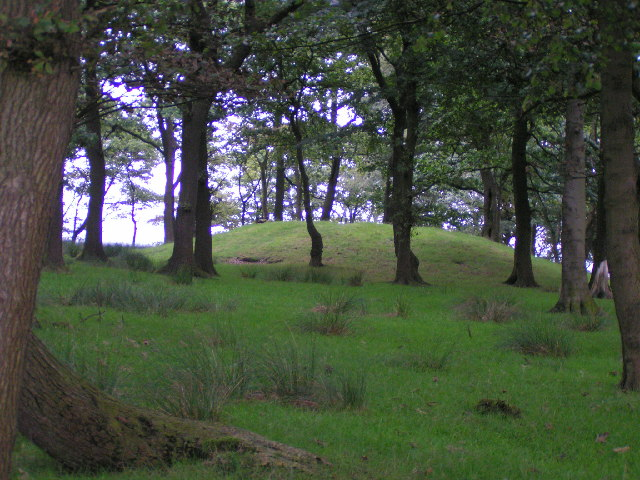
Brown Low

Map showing the location of Brown Low within Greater Manchester.

Brown Low is a bowl barrow most likely dating to the Bronze Age. An earth and stone mound survives east of Marple, Greater Manchester (grid reference SJ98829092). It is listed as a Scheduled Ancient Monument. The mound was partially excavated by the Rev William Marriott in 1809, who discovered fragments of burnt stones and cremated bones, as well as a preserved acorn. Marriott also describes the finding of a funerary urn in an adjacent barrow during an unauthorised excavation. Brown Low is on private land, just east of a public footpath running off Sandy Lane.

== See also ==
- Scheduled Monuments in Greater Manchester
