= Standedge =

Coordinates: 53°34′59.51″N 01°58′8.51″W

Map showing the location of Standedge in the United Kingdom

Standedge (/stænɪdʒ/) is a moorland escarpment in the Pennine Hills of northern England between Marsden, West Yorkshire and Diggle, Greater Manchester. Standedge has been a major moorland crossing point since Roman times and possibly earlier.

From east to west, Standedge is crossed by five generations of road crossing, the earliest a Roman road from York to Chester and the latest the A62 road. The Huddersfield Narrow Canal and the railway line from Leeds to Manchester pass underground in the Standedge Tunnels. The Pennine Way long-distance footpath passes through Standedge in a north–south direction along the Pennines.

Much of Standedge is in the National Trust's Marsden Moor Estate. Administratively, Standedge is split between Kirklees and Oldham.

== Surface crossings ==
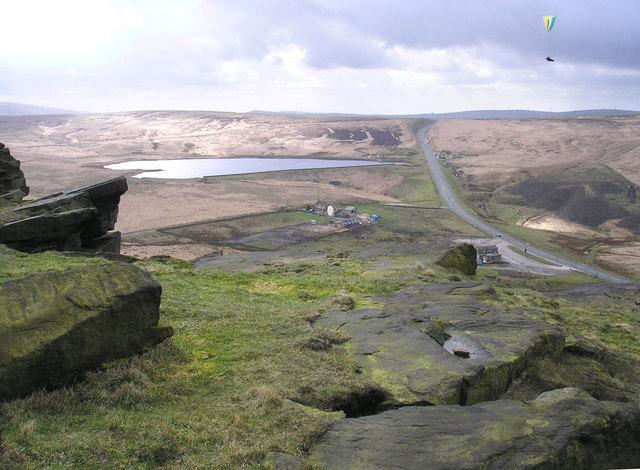
Standedge seen from the top of Pule Hill. The A62 cutting and Redbrook Reservoir can be seen.

The earliest known crossing of Standedge is the Roman road connecting the Roman forts at Slack and Castleshaw, on the way from York to Chester. The road is believed to have been built in AD 80. Its course was identified in 1969 to the north-east of Castleshaw fort, climbing Standedge Ridge by means of a graded terraceway. It was originally more than 22 feet (6.7 m) wide but has been considerably eroded.

After the Roman road fell into disuse, travel across the moors was restricted to tracks, used by packhorses. One crossed from Marsden to Rochdale. Narrow and packhorse bridges can be found in several places on the moors, including the Close Gate Bridge near Marsden.

The first metalled road between Huddersfield to Manchester was built in 1760. It was followed by another road, known locally as the coach road, built by John Metcalf (Blind Jack of Knaresborough) in 1791. It crossed the Pennine ridge south of the present Standedge cutting.

In 1839 the coach road was replaced by a new turnpike road, the Wakefield and Austerlands Toll Road. Trenches were cut in the coach road, to prevent it being used as a free alternative. This route is used today by the A62 road, crossing the summit of Standedge in a cutting. The M62 motorway now carries most cross-Pennine road traffic on a different route to the north of Standedge.

== Tunnel crossings ==
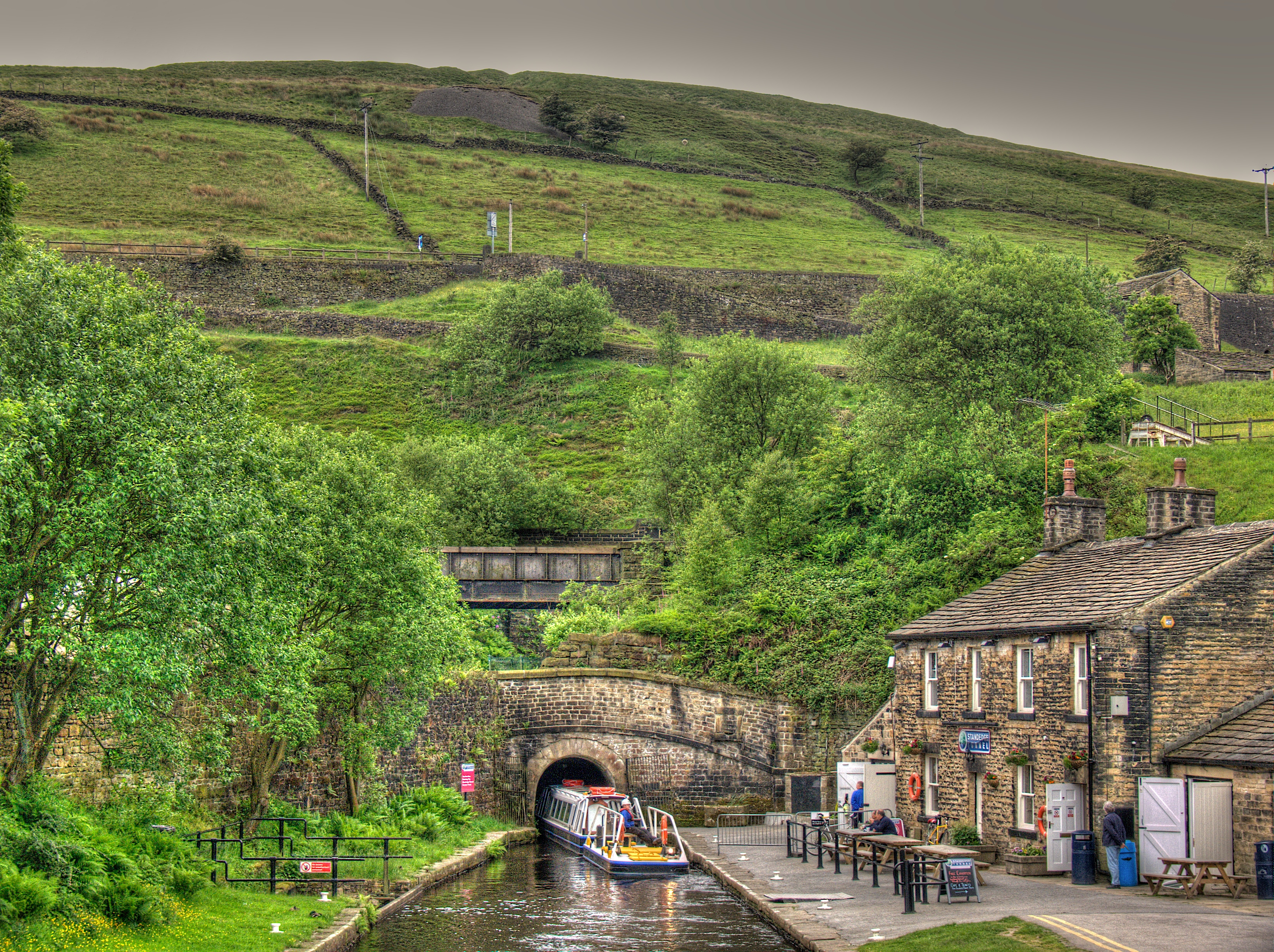
Entrance to Standedge Tunnel on the Huddersfield Narrow Canal

Four parallel tunnels run under Standedge between Diggle and Marsden. The single canal tunnel on the Huddersfield Narrow Canal is the oldest, having been opened in 1811, and is still in use. Three railway tunnels were opened, the first in 1848, and in 1871 and 1894, but only the 1894 tunnel still carries rail traffic. The four tunnels are linked by cross-tunnels or adits at strategic intervals inside the tunnels, and the 1848 rail tunnel has been made accessible to road vehicles for use as an emergency access and evacuation route for the other tunnels.

== Standedge ==
Standedge is a sparsely populated area, although it does have two former public houses – the Carriage House and the Great Western – within a few hundred metres of each other on the A62 road. There are two reservoirs and pathways for hikers.

Standedge can be accessed by bus on the 184 service between Huddersfield and Manchester via Oldham. The service is run by First Greater Manchester and there are bus stops on each side of the road near the summit of Standedge (at the crossing of the Pennine Way and Pennine Bridleway). The buses are hourly Monday to Saturday daytime and run every two hours on Sunday daytimes.
