= Castleshaw =

Coordinates: 53.583°N 1.999°W

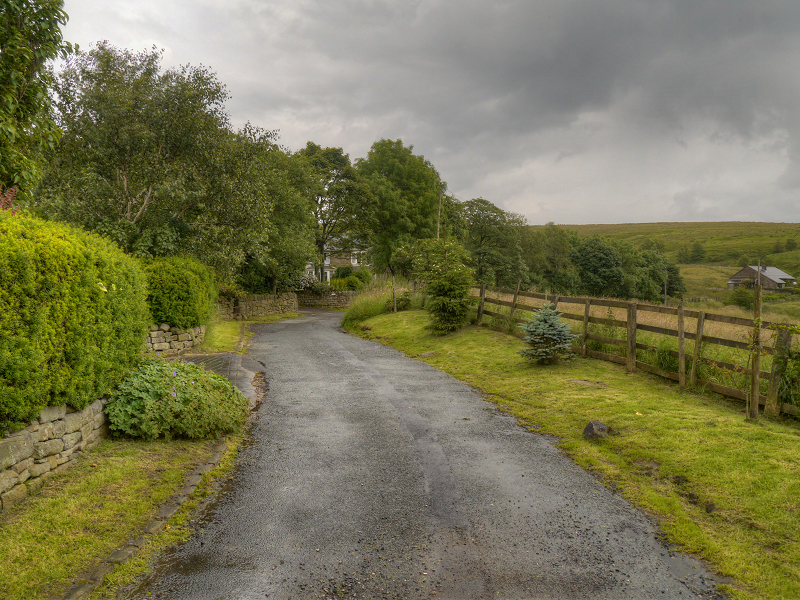
- Bleak Hey Nook Lane, Castleshaw

- Location within Greater Manchester
- OS grid reference: SE000096
- Civil parish: Saddleworth
- Metropolitan borough: Oldham
- Metropolitan county: Greater Manchester
- Region: North West
- Country: England
- Sovereign state: United Kingdom
- Post town: OLDHAM
- Postcode district: OL3
- Dialling code: 01457
- Police: Greater Manchester
- Fire: Greater Manchester
- Ambulance: North West
- UK Parliament: Oldham East and Saddleworth

Castleshaw is a hamlet in the Saddleworth parish of the Metropolitan Borough of Oldham in Greater Manchester, England. It lies amid the Pennines, 2.4 miles (3.9 km) north of Uppermill, 3 miles (4.8 km) west-southwest of Marsden, and 5.3 miles (8.5 km) east-northeast of Oldham.

Historically a part of the West Riding of Yorkshire, Castleshaw is most notable for the Castleshaw Roman fort, the remains of an ancient castrum. There are two reservoirs, Castleshaw upper reservoir and Castleshaw lower reservoir. In 2016, United Utilities reinforced the walls on the lower reservoir but had to drop water levels by 1m.

== History ==
There used to be a Roman fort situated near to the head of the valley. A series of modern mounds and ditches have been laid out to mark the site, on the edge of Castleshaw Upper Reservoir. The Castleshaw area was once also home to a sanitorium, which is now used as a Youth Training Centre.
