= Mossley (disambiguation) =

Mossley is a town in Greater Manchester, England.

Mossley may also refer to:

- Mossley, Walsall, an area of Bloxwich, West Midlands, England

== Uses in Greater Manchester, England ==
- Mossley (ward), a ward in Tameside, Greater Manchester
- Mossley (UK Parliament constituency), a former parliamentary constituency (1918-1950) in Greater Manchester
- Mossley railway station, a railway station in Greater Manchester
- Mossley A.F.C., a football club in Greater Manchester
- Mossley Hall, a grade II listed former town hall in Greater Manchester

== Uses in Cheshire, England ==
- Mossley, Cheshire, an area of Congleton
- Mossley Hall, Congleton, a grade II listed building in Congleton
- Mossley Halt railway station, a former station in Congleton
- Mossley CE Primary School, a primary school in Congleton

== Uses in Northern Ireland ==
- Mossley F.C., a football club in Northern Ireland
- Mossley Hockey Club, a field hockey club in Northern Ireland
- Mossley West railway station, a railway station in Northern Ireland

== Other uses ==
- Mossley, Ontario, a community in Thames Centre, Middlesex County, Ontario, Canada

== See also ==
- Mossley Hill, suburb of Liverpool, England
- Mossleigh, a hamlet in southern Alberta
- Mosley (disambiguation)
- Mosely, a surname
