= Heyheads =

Suburb of Stalybridge, Greater Manchester, England

Coordinates: 53.5096°N 2.0283°W

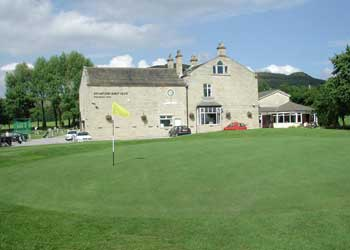
Stamford Golf Club clubhouse, Oakfield House

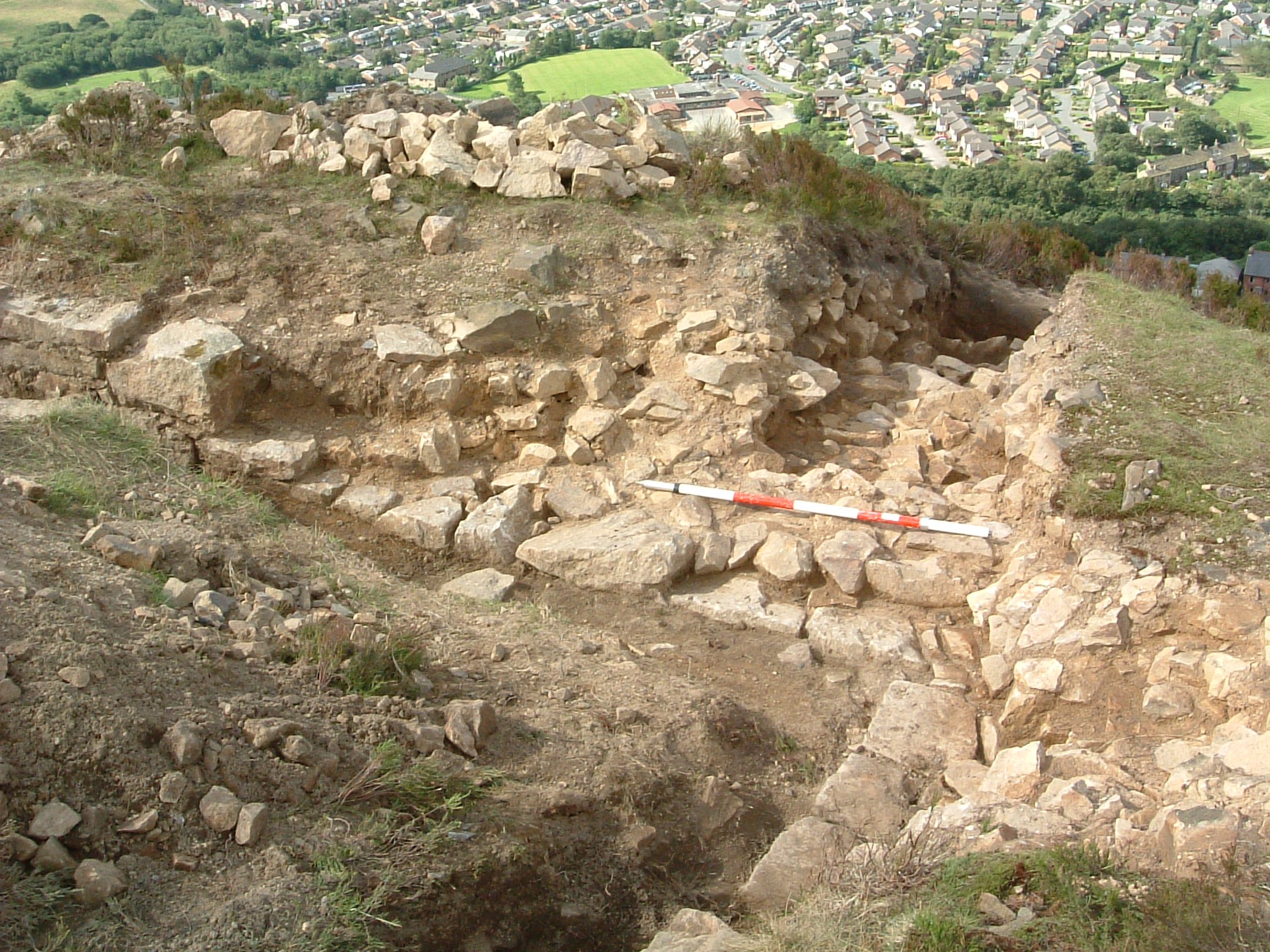
Excavation of Buckton Castle in 2007 with view of Heyheads and Carrbrook in the background

Heyheads is the easternmost area of Stalybridge, in Tameside, Greater Manchester, England. The area includes the late 17th-century and 18th-century Grade II listed Nos. 1, 2 and 3 School Lane, as well as Moorgate Farmhouse with its adjoining barn and shippon buildings. Boundary cottages mark the division between Stalybridge and Mossley and the historic boundary between Cheshire and Lancashire. Modern housing was built along Huddersfield Road in the 1970s, with a further estate added near Moorgate in the 1990s.

The view to the south is dominated by the steep-sided Buckton Hill, on the summit of which stands Buckton Castle. Stamford Golf Club has an 18-hole course to the north of Huddersfield Road. The club was incorporated on 24 August 1901 and was named after the local landowner, the Earl of Stamford.
