= Carrbrook =

Village in Greater Manchester, England

Coordinates: 53.5°N 2.03°W

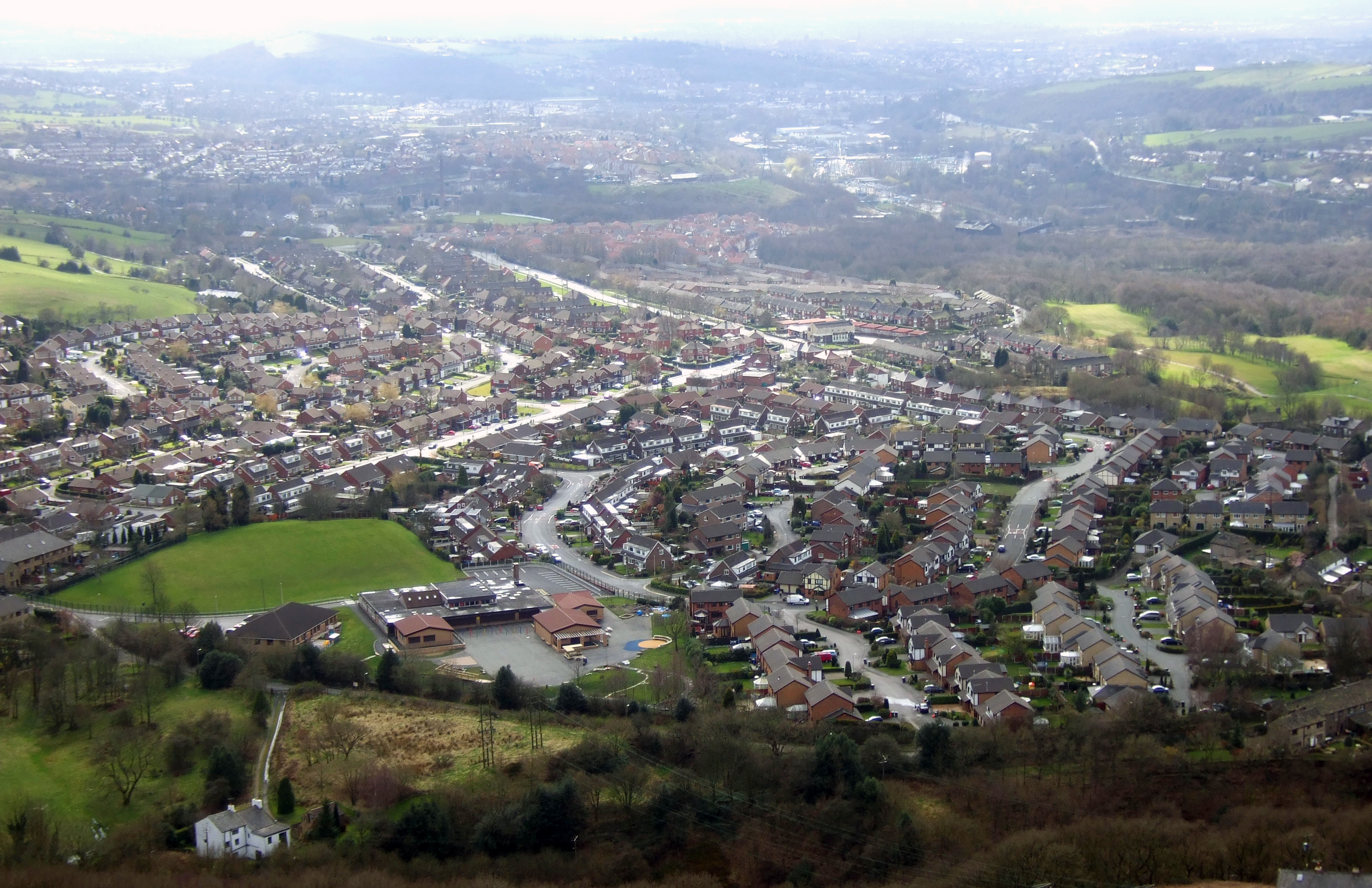
- Carrbrook from Buckton Hill

- Location within Greater Manchester
- OS grid reference: SD9801
- Metropolitan borough: Tameside
- Metropolitan county: Greater Manchester
- Region: North West
- Country: England
- Sovereign state: United Kingdom
- Post town: STALYBRIDGE
- Postcode district: SK15
- Dialling code: 01457
- Police: Greater Manchester
- Fire: Greater Manchester
- Ambulance: North West
- UK Parliament: Stalybridge and Hyde

Carrbrook is a village east of Stalybridge, in Greater Manchester, England. Historically part of Cheshire, the area still has many seventeenth and eighteenth-century buildings. Much of the late-nineteenth and the early-twentieth-century village was built during the industrial boom brought by the printworks. In the 1970s modern Housing estates were built next to the old village on the lower flank of Harridge Pike. The view to the east of Carrbrook is dominated by the steep-sided Buckton Hill, on the summit of which is located Buckton Castle. Neighbouring communities include Millbrook, Heyheads and Mossley.

Many properties in Carrbrook were threatened by a large wildfire burning on Buckton Moor in late June 2018. The fires burned for several weeks and the damage caused is still visible to this day. On 26 June 2018, 50 properties in Carrbrook were evacuated as the fire advanced towards the settlement. Carrbrook is now part of a high fire risk zone.

On 27 December 2023 at approx. 23:10 GMT, a tornado hit the village during Storm Gerrit - the strongest in the UK since 2006. Heavy damage was done to some structures, however no deaths were recorded.

== Education ==
The village school is named Buckton Vale Primary. The current school is the 3rd building.

Although there are no Secondary Schools in the village itself, nearby schools (which ultimately serve the village) are Copley Academy and Mossley Hollins High School.

== Music ==
Every year on Whit Friday, Carrbrook is host to a popular brass band contest which takes place in the car park opposite the Buckton Vale Institute.

== Transport ==
Bus routes serving the village include (as of January 2026):

- 348: Carrbrook to Ashton via Stalybridge. This service is operated by Stagecoach as part of the Bee Network.
- 343: Hyde to Oldham. This service is operated by Diamond North West as part of the Bee Network and is the only service to connect the village with nearby Mossley.

Departures from Carrbrook South View/near Castle lane bus stop
