= Colliers Arms =

Colliers Arms may refer to:

- Colliers Arms, Aspull, a pub in Greater Manchester, England
- Colliers Arms, Mossley, a former pub in Greater Manchester
