= Colliers Arms, Mossley =

Listed former pub in Tameside, Greater Manchester, England

Colliers Arms
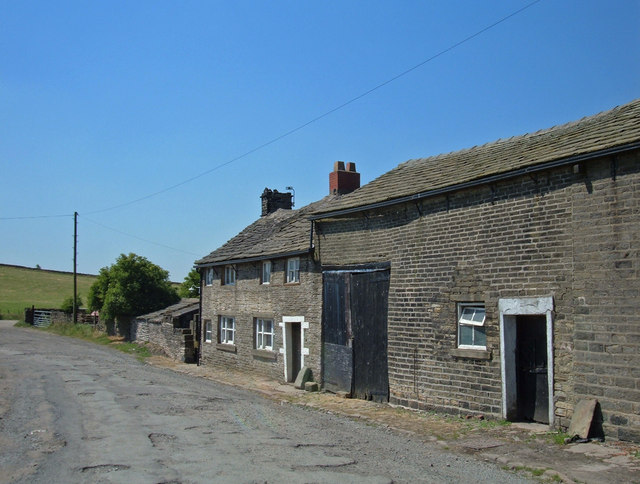
- The former pub in 2006

- Location within Greater Manchester
- Alternative names: Collier's Arms; Colliers' Arms

General information
- Status: Converted to residential use
- Type: Public house (former); originally a house
- Location: Lily Lanes, Mossley, Greater Manchester, England
- Coordinates: 53.5203°N 2.0589°W
- Year built: Late 18th century
- Renovated: 19th century (altered and added)
- Closed: c. 2000s (as a pub)

Design and construction
- Designations

Listed Building – Grade II
- Official name: Former Collier's Arms public house
- Designated: 9 July 1998
- Reference no.: 1375635

The Colliers Arms is a Grade II listed former public house on Lily Lanes (Note: The building's official listing gives its address as Broadcarr Lane, but its address is on Lily Lanes.) on the outskirts of Mossley, a town in Tameside, Greater Manchester, England. Built in the late 18th century as a house and altered in the 19th century, it stands on the hillside below Hartshead Pike Tower. It was in use as a pub by the time of the late 19th and early 20th‑century Ordnance Survey maps. The pub closed in the 2000s and was later converted to residential use.

== History ==
The building was constructed in the late 18th century as a house, according to its official listing, and underwent unspecified alterations and additions during the 19th century. The 1894 and 1935 Ordnance Survey maps show the building as the Colliers' Arms public house.

On 9 July 1998, the Colliers Arms was designated a Grade II listed building. According to the Campaign for Real Ale (CAMRA), the pub had closed by 2010 and was later converted to residential use. It stands close to Hartshead Pike Tower, on the high ground below the ridge.

== Architecture ==
The building is constructed of sandstone with roughly finished blocks and has stone details around the openings. It has chimneys along the main roof ridge and at the gable ends, with the ridge stack later rebuilt in red brick. The roof is covered with stone slates that are laid in gradually smaller courses. The plan consists of two parallel ranges, with a recessed extension attached to the left side of the rear range.

The front has two storeys and three bays. The main entrance is at the right-hand end, set within a stone surround. There are two windows with three lights each, with the centre light wider than the outer ones. On the upper floor are two and three-light windows, mostly with later 20th‑century frames, except for the right-hand window, which has small paired sashes. Another entrance to the building is in a 20th‑century porch against the left gable. Behind this, the extended rear range has tall, narrow two‑light windows arranged one above the other, also with later frames.

The attached outbuilding is slightly taller than the main house and shares the same gable, where small projecting stones sit just above the roofline. At the left-hand end is a tall double door. To the right is a lofted section above what appears to have been a cowhouse or stable, with two ground‑floor doorways framed in stone. There is also an opening to the loft in the left gable.

== See also ==
- Listed buildings in Mossley
- Listed pubs in Greater Manchester
