= Mossley Hall =

Municipal building in Mossley, Greater Manchester, England

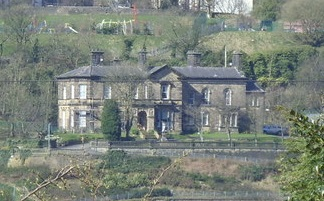
- The building in 2009

- Shown in Greater Manchester
- 53.5152°N 2.0426°W
- Location: Stamford Road, Mossley

History
- Built: 1864

Site notes
- Architect: William Williamson
- Architectural style: Italianate style

Listed Building – Grade II
- Official name: Former Mossley Town Hall
- Designated: 22 November 1966
- Reference no.: 1068044

Mossley Hall, formerly known as Mossley Town Hall, is a former municipal building in Stamford Road, Mossley, a town in Greater Manchester in England. The building, which served as the offices and meeting place of Mossley Borough Council, is a grade II listed building.

== History ==
The building was commissioned as a private house by a local cotton mill proprietor, George Mayall and his wife, Esther Mayall. The Mayall family owned Bottoms' Mill on Mill Street on the east side of the railway and had installed a large number of new cotton-spinning machines there. The site they selected for their house was on the west side of Stamford Road, on the site of an old quarry.

Work began on the new building in 1861. It was designed by William Williamson in the Italianate style, built by Edward Marland in ashlar stone at a cost of over £60,000 and was completed in 1864. The design involved an asymmetric main frontage of eight bays facing Stamford Road. Esther died before the building was completed, and it was instead occupied by their son, Edmund Lees Mayall, and his wife, Martha. Martha lived in the house after Edmund died in 1877. The house had two lodges and was known as Whitehall.

In 1885, the local area was incorporated as a municipal borough and the Mossley local board of health was succeeded by Mossley Borough Council. In 1891, the new council purchased the building for just £4,000. It was refurbished and officially opened by the mayor, Joseph Fearns Lawton, as Mossley Town Hall on 7 May 1892.

A serious accident occurred in Mossley on 20 October 1911, when a tram ran away down Stamford Road, derailed and crashed onto the railway at Mossley railway station, killing the guard and four passengers and seriously injuring four passengers. The ensuing inquest was held in the town hall.

During the First World War the building was used as a venue to hear appeals against conscription. It was also the meeting place of the Food Control Committee, which organised food rationing in the area. A memorial, in the form of a female figure sculpted in white marble standing on a pedestal, which was intended to commemorate the lives of local service personnel who had died in the war, was unveiled in front of the town hall by the mayor, John Platt, on 9 October 1920.

The building was grade II listed in 1966. It continued to serve as the headquarters of the borough council for much of the 20th century, but ceased to be the local seat of government when the enlarged Tameside Metropolitan Borough Council was formed in 1974. The building subsequently became disused and, after being declared surplus to requirements by the council, it was eventually sold in 1986. Many of the lavish interior fittings were removed in 1999, when it was acquired for residential use by Philip and Carol Wilson. They initiated an extensive refurbishment programme, which was completed in 2015.

== Architecture ==
The two-storey building is constructed of stone, with a slate roof. The third bay on the left, which is projected forward, features a tri-partite window on the ground floor, a pedimented sash window on the first floor and a gable above. The second bay on the left features a porch, which is also projected forward and formed by piers supporting arches with keystones. The porch is highly ornamented with various carved panels, a balustrade above, and urns on the corners.

== See also ==
- Listed buildings in Mossley
