= Hartshead Pike =

Hill and monument in Greater Manchester, England

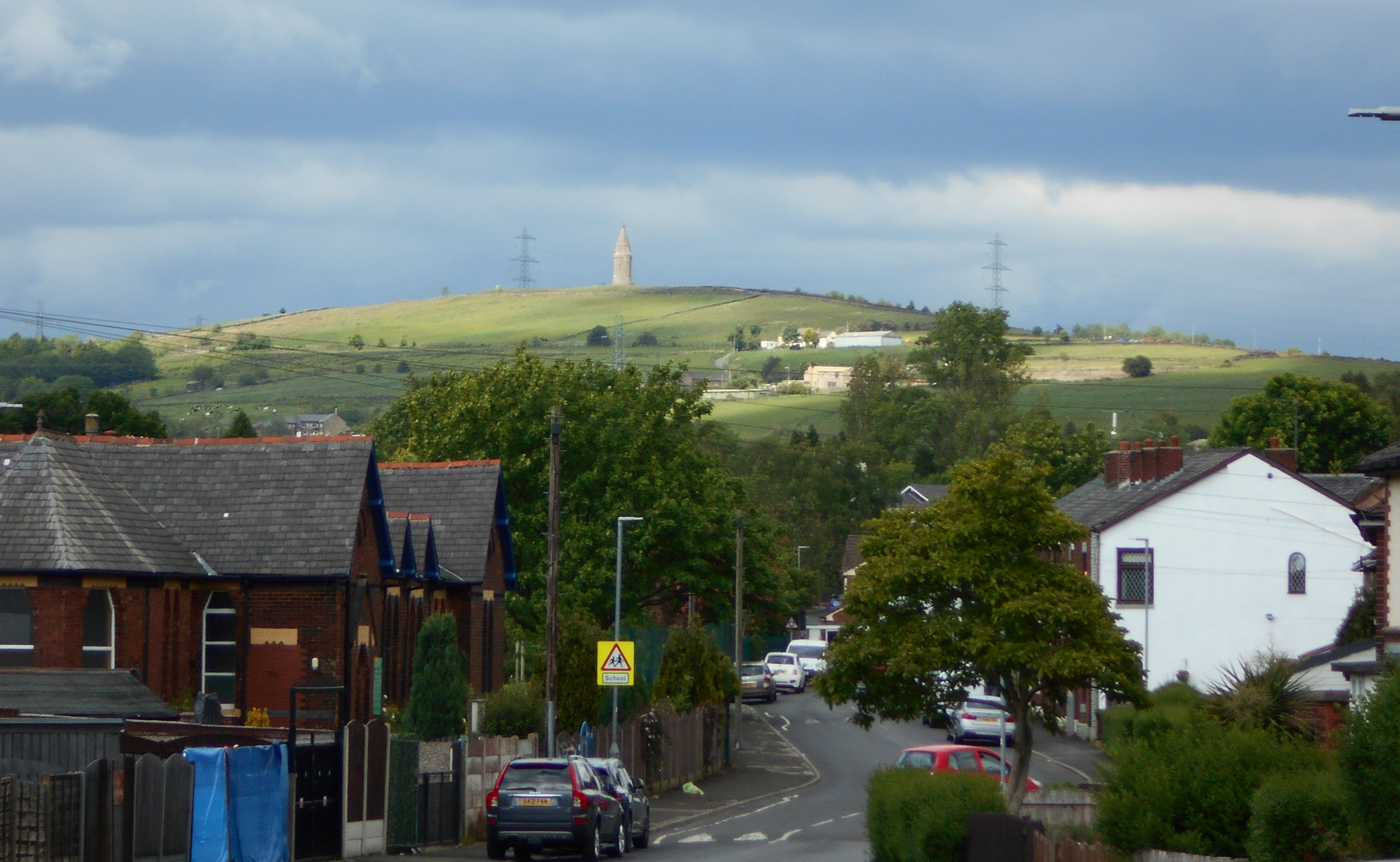
- Hartshead Pike seen from Ashton-under-Lyne

Highest point
- Elevation: 267 m (876 ft)
- Coordinates: 53°31′5.88″N 2°3′39.24″W

Geography
- Location within Greater Manchester
- Location: Ashton-U-Lyne; Greater Manchester, England
- Parent range: South Pennines

Geology
- Mountain type: Pike

Hartshead Pike is a hill in Tameside in Greater Manchester, England, and its name is associated with the monument on its summit. It overlooks Ashton-under-Lyne, Mossley, Saddleworth, Lees and Oldham. On a clear day you can get views of Manchester, Cheshire and Snowdonia in Wales. Hartshead Pike Tower has been a Grade II listed building since 1967.

== History ==
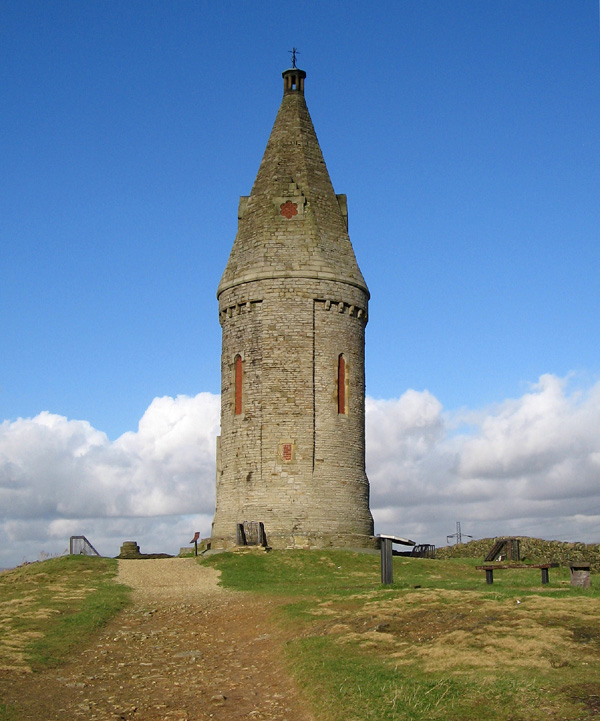
The tower on Hartshead Pike

During the Roman occupation of Britain, a warning beacon for local garrisons, possibly lit during times of unrest, may have been sited on Hartshead Pike. Local trackways were routes for the Romans to access the Roman road at Limeside.

The name refers to the hill and the tower. The tower is not on the highest part of the hill but its prominent position, 940 feet (290 m) above sea level, has been the site of a beacon or signalling station from early times and may have been the site of a beacon in the late 16th century.

== Tower ==
The circular, grade-II-listed tower is constructed of hammer-dressed stone with a door on the west side and cusped lancet windows. It has a steeply pitched conical roof above corbelled eaves and dormer roof lights.

The tower was rebuilt in 1863 by John Eaton to commemorate the marriage of Albert Edward to Princess Alexandra, replacing a building that had been there since 1751. An inscription stone reused in the tower states "This Pike Was Rebuilt By Publick Contributions Anno Domini 1751".

In the 1930s the tower was open to the public and contained a sweet shop; it closed at the outbreak of the Second World War and the tower entrance was bricked up after the war. During 2020 the tower underwent £61,000 of repairs, to stop it from deteriorating.

There is a well on the summit enclosed by a stone slab. The inscription above the tower's entrance reads "Look well at me Before you go And See You nothing at me throw".

== Gallery ==
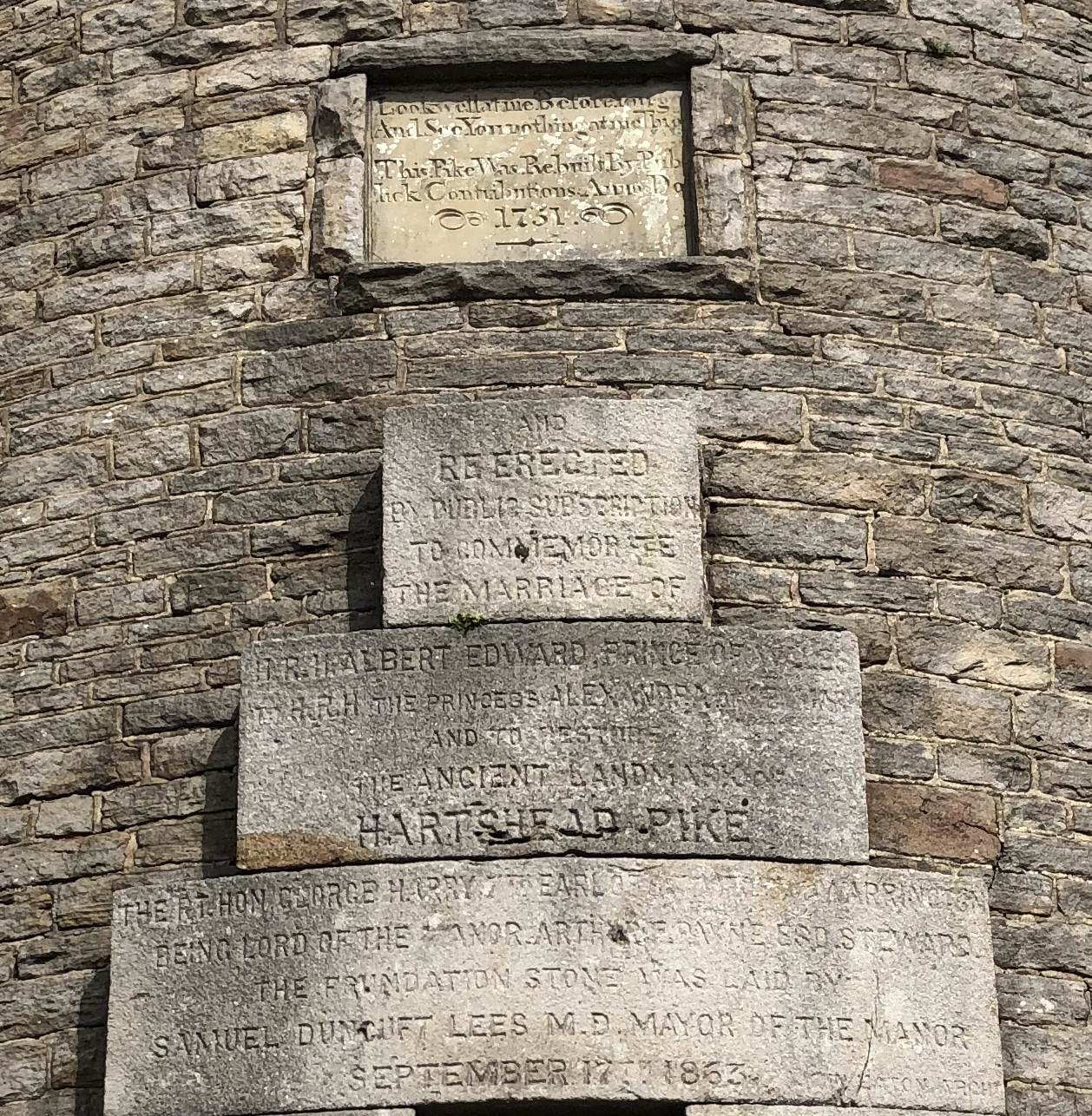
Hartshead Pike Inscription

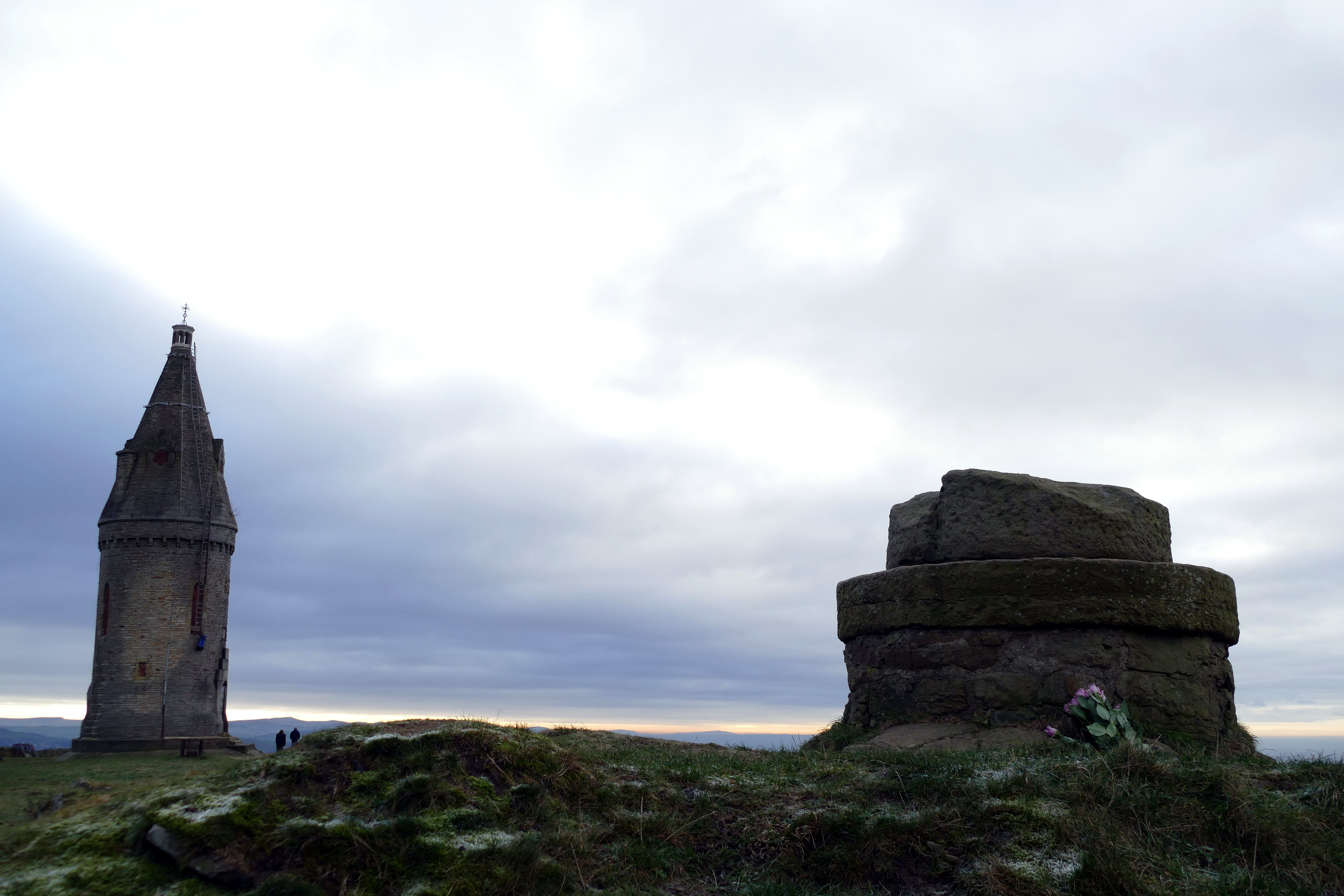
Hartshead Pike showing detail of stone well.

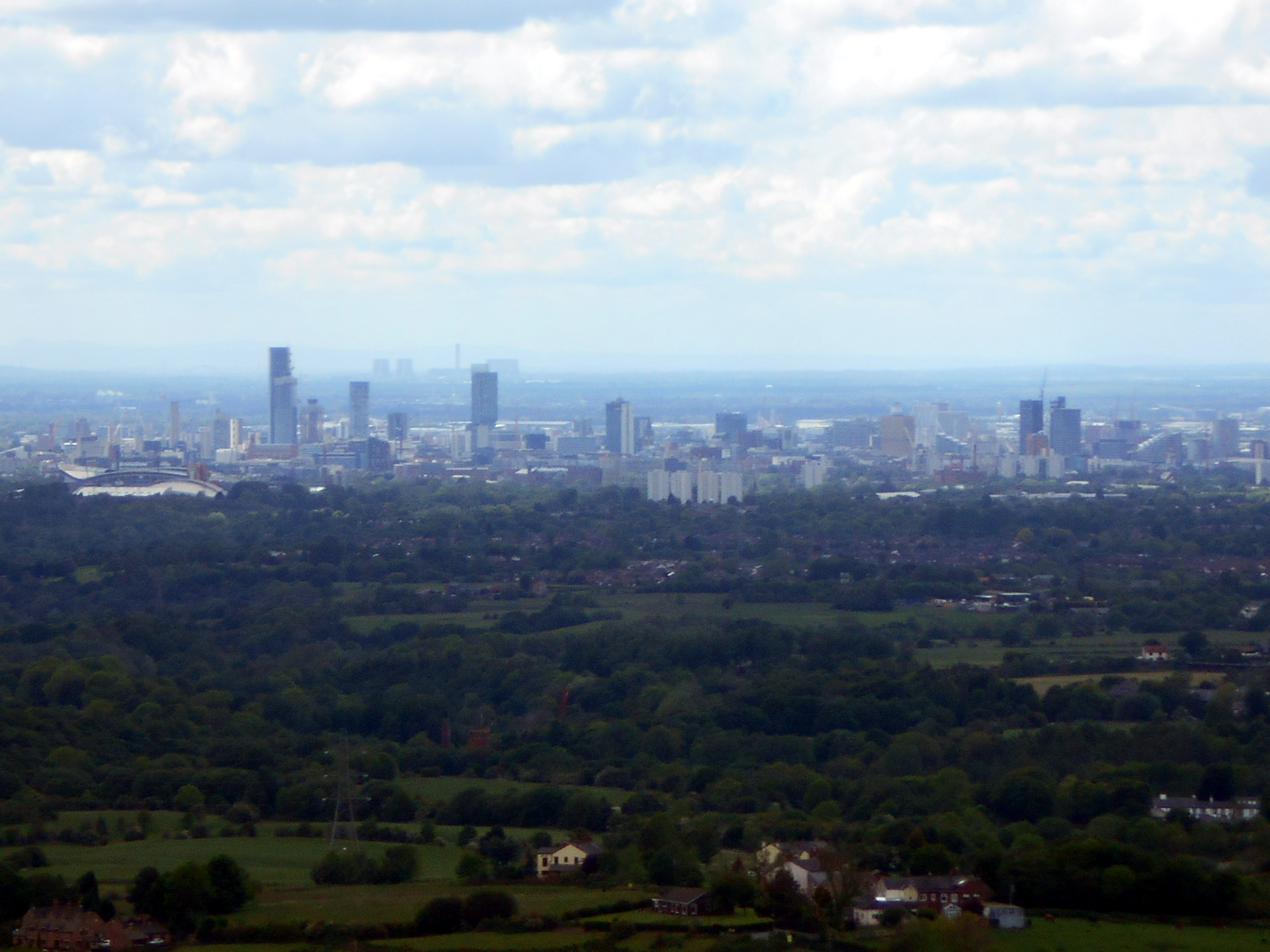
View of Manchester from Hartshead Pike, 8 miles (13 km) away with Fiddlers Ferry Power Station beyond, 27 miles (43 km) away.

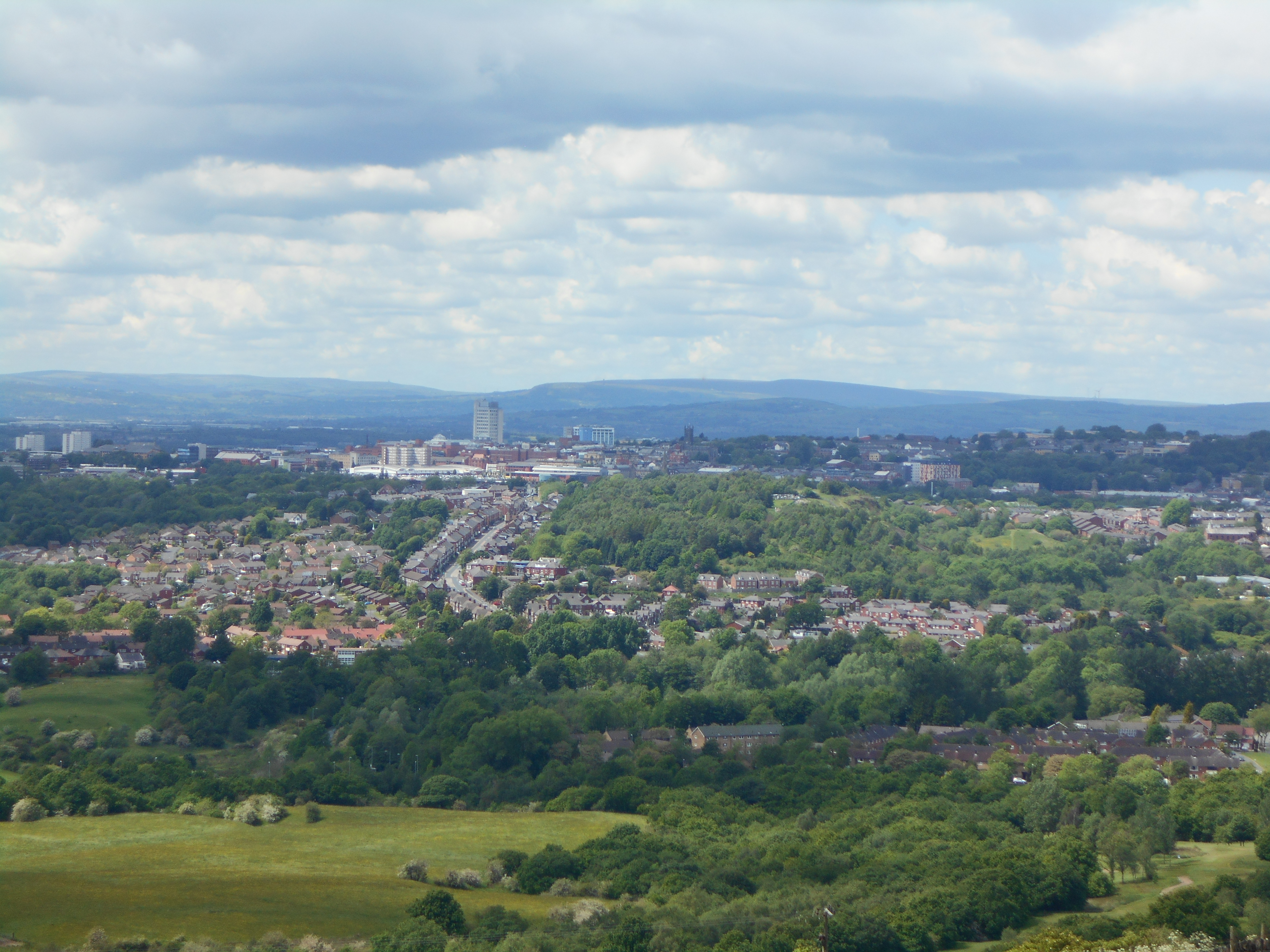
View of Oldham from Hartshead Pike, 2.5 miles (4.0 km) away.

== See also ==
- Listed buildings in Ashton-under-Lyne
