= Billy Dennis (English footballer) =

English footballer

Personal information
- Full name: William Dennis
- Date of birth: 21 September 1896
- Place of birth: Mossley, England
- Date of death: 1952 (aged 55–56)
- Height: 5 ft 9 in (1.75 m)
- Position: Full-back

Senior career*
Years	Team	Apps	(Gls)
- Ashton PSA
- Denton
- Birkenhead Comets (wartime)
- Linfield (wartime)
- Tranmere Rovers (wartime)
1919	Stalybridge Celtic	?	(?)
1919–1920	Blackburn Rovers	5	(0)
1920–1923	Stalybridge Celtic	72	(0)
1923–1924	Manchester United	3	(0)
1924–1928	Chesterfield	166	(6)
1928–1930	Wigan Borough	67	(0)
1930–1931	Macclesfield	37	(8)
1931–1933	Hurst	57	(0)
1933–1934	Mossley	1	(0)
- * Club domestic league appearances and goals

William Dennis (21 September 1896 – 1952) was an English footballer. His regular position was at full back. He was born in Mossley, Lancashire. He played for Ashton PSA and Denton before joining the army during World War I during which time he also featured for Birkenhead Comets, Linfield and Tranmere Rovers. Post-war he joined Stalybridge Celtic then was signed by First Division Blackburn Rovers. After a short spell at Ewood Park he re-joined Stalybridge in time to play in the Football League for them. He moved back to the First Division with Manchester United for a short lived spell prior to joining the club with whom he was to have his longest association Chesterfield. He finished his League career with Wigan Borough, before leaving the cash-strapped club for Cheshire League football with first Macclesfield and then Hurst. Aged 37 he joined Mossley as trainer, also making one appearance for his home town club.

He was also a talented cricketer representing Cheshire in the Minor Counties between 1924 and 1933 in 52 matches as a fast bowler taking 205 wickets at an average of 15.49 and scoring 517 runs, and was professional for Stalybridge in the Lancashire and Cheshire League between 1925 and 1929, and for Milnrow in the Central Lancashire League from 1930.
