= Listed buildings in Mossley =

Mossley is a civil parish in Tameside, Greater Manchester, England, and includes the small town of Mossley and the surrounding countryside. The parish contains 50 listed buildings that are recorded in the National Heritage List for England. All the listed buildings are designated at Grade II, the lowest of the three grades, which is applied to "buildings of national importance and special interest".

Mossley was originally a rural and agricultural area, and in the 18th and early 19th century houses were adapted for handloom weaving. Some of these buildings have survived and are listed. The Huddersfield Narrow Canal passes through the parish, and listed buildings associated with this include bridges, locks, a milestone, and the entrances to a tunnel. The other listed buildings include houses, farmhouses, farm buildings, a public house, a former mill, a former town hall, a church and its lychgate, and a war memorial.

== Buildings ==
Name and location	Photograph	Date	Notes
Manor House and wall 53.52315°N 2.03820°W	—	17th century	A house that has been much altered, extended, and divided into separate dwellings. It is in stone with rusticated quoins and a stone-slate roof. The house has three storeys, a symmetrical front of three bays with two gables and a pediment between. The central doorway has a rusticated surround and a pediment. The windows are mullioned, and in the gables are circular windows. In front of the house is a garden wall with a rusticated pier.
Inglenook; 53.51391°N 2.03702°W	—	Late 17th century	Originally several cottages, altered and extended in the 18th century, and later two houses. They are in stone with quoins and a roof of slate and asbestos slate. The houses have a single-depth plan, two storeys, and incorporate a former barn. The windows are mullioned, doors have been moved, there is a blocked cart door, and a 20th-century bay window and a lean-to.
Overgreen; 53.51718°N 2.02250°W	—	Late 17th to early 18th century	A stone house with a projecting plinth, quoins, and a roof of slate and stone-slate. It has two storeys and an L-shaped plan, with a main range and a rear wing. The doors have square-cut surrounds and the windows in the main range are mullioned. In the rear wing there is a mullioned window, and the other windows are sashes.
2 and 7–17 Quickwood; 53.52308°N 2.03794°W		Early 18th century	A terrace of cottages that was later extended. There are seven stone cottages with shaped eaves gutter brackets, a stone-slate roof, two storeys, and a single-depth plan. The doorway of No. 9 has panelled pilasters and a keystone with a rose motif, and each of the other cottages has a doorway with a square-cut surround. All the cottages have mullioned windows.
Castle Cottages; 53.51022°N 2.02282°W	—	Early to mid-18th century	A house that was extended in the 18th century with a barn to the north and an attic storey to provide a workshop. It is in stone with a stone-slate roof, and has two storeys with an attic. Most of the windows are mullioned, some containing sashes, and others casements. In the barn is a pitching doorway.
Howard's Farmhouse and cottages 53.51911°N 2.02399°W	—	Early to mid-18th century	A group of three stone houses on a projecting plinth, with quoins and a stone-slate roof. They all have a double-depth plan, the first two houses have three storeys, and the third has two bays of two storeys, and one of four. There is a total of nine bays. The doorways have square-cut surrounds, and the windows are mullioned. At the rear is a small range that may contain earlier material.
Kershaw Hey Farmhouse; 53.50708°N 2.03645°W	—	Early to mid-18th century	A stone farmhouse with a double-depth plan and roofs of slate and stone-slate. On the left is a two-storey one-bay block, and to the right is a three-storey two-bay block on a projecting plinth with a rear wing. The windows are mullioned, and the doorway in the left gable end has a square-cut surround.
Holly Bank Farmhouse and barn 53.52644°N 2.05012°W	—	1744	The farmhouse and the barn extending to the west are in stone with a stone-slate roof. The farmhouse has an L-shaped single-depth plan, two storeys, a doorway with an ogee-shaped inscribed lintel, mullioned windows, and a blocked taking-in door. The barn has a central door flanked by windows with stone sills and lintels.
5 Strawberry Lane; 53.52706°N 2.03844°W	—	Mid-18th century	A stone house with a stone-slate roof, three storeys, two bays, and a rear wing. The doorway in the gable end has a square-cut surround, and the windows on the south front have five lights and are mullioned.
Carr House; 53.50758°N 2.01657°W	—	Mid-18th century	A house, at one time a public house, it is in stone with a stone-slate roof, two storeys, a single-depth plan, four bays, and a lean-to on the left. There are two doorways with square-cut surrounds and canopies, one with a porch. The windows in the main part are mullioned, and in the lean-to they are sashes.
Castle Cottage; 53.51030°N 2.02257°W	—	Mid-18th century	A farmhouse, later a private house, in stone with a stone-slate roof. It has two storeys, a single-depth plan, three bays, and a shippon to the right. There is a central door, the windows are mullioned, and in the shippon are quoins and vents.
Summerhill Cottage; 53.52225°N 2.03673°W	—	Mid-18th century	A stone house with a stone-slate roof, two storeys, a single-depth plan, and two bays. The central doorway has a square-cut surround, and the windows are mullioned.
Hillside Farm; 53.52440°N 2.04443°W	—	18th century	A row of three cottages that were altered in the 19th and 20th centuries. They are in stone, partly rendered, and have a slate roof with coped gables. The cottages have two storeys, one bay each, 20th-century porches, and mullioned windows.
Oakdene; 53.51133°N 2.03088°W	—	1755	A stone house on a projecting plinth, with a stone-slate roof. It has a double-depth plan, two storeys and three bays. Above the central doorway is an initialled and dated lintel. The windows are mullioned, and at the rear is a stair window.
7, 9, 11 and 11A Midge Hill; 53.52876°N 2.03641°W	—	Mid to late 18th century	A row of three stone houses and a flat with stone-slate roofs. They have three storeys with attics, a double-depth plan and a front of eight bays. Nos. 7 and 9 have doorways with moulded surrounds and cornices, and No. 7 also has a fanlight. The doorway of No. 9 has a square-cut surround. Most of the windows are multi-light mullioned workshop windows. In the right gable is a small window and a Venetian window. The houses are built into a hillside, and at the rear steps lead to the upper floor, and there is a taking-in door.
9 Broadcarr Lane; 53.51682°N 2.05259°W	—	Mid to late 18th century	A stone house with a slate roof and a rendered gable end. There are three storeys, two bays, and a porch on the left. Most of the windows have five lights and are mullioned.
Alphin House; 53.51760°N 2.02272°W	—	Mid to late 18th century	A stone house with a rendered right gable and a roof of slate and stone-slate. It has two and three storeys, a double-depth plan, two bays, a lean-to porch on the left and a 19th-century porch on the front. The windows are mullioned.
Windy Harbour Farmhouse and shippon 53.49882°N 2.05272°W	—	1766	The farmhouse and shippon are in stone with a stone-slate roof and additions in brick. The farmhouse has two storeys, three bays, a continuous rear outshut, and the shippon is to the east. The house has a central doorway, there is one casement window, and the other windows are mullioned. In the shippon there are various openings.
6 Strawberry Lane; 53.52845°N 2.03919°W	—	Late 18th century	A stone house with a stone-slate roof, two storeys and a rear outshut. There are two bays, the left dating from the 19th century and the right from the 18th. Both have doors with square-cut surrounds, the right bay has a five-light mullioned window in each floor, and the left bay has 20th-century replacements.
18 Carhill Road and cottages 53.52116°N 2.04309°W	—	Late 18th century	A building originally intended for multiple occupation by weavers, later private houses. The building is in stone with a stone-slate roof, three storeys, a double-depth plan, two bays, and steps at the sides giving access to the workshops. The doorways have square-cut surrounds, and most windows are mullioned.
32 and 32 Greenhill Cottages; 53.52288°N 2.03547°W	—	Late 18th century	A pair of stone houses with quoins, a stone-slate roof, three storeys, a double-depth plan, and one bay each. The doorway has a square-cut surround, and the windows are mullioned. In the gable is a blocked taking-in door.
Car Cottages, right hand cottage 53.50784°N 2.01641°W	—	Late 18th century	A stone house with a slate roof, a double-depth plan, three bays, and two and three storeys. The third bay is recessed and has a 20th-century porch in the angle. The doorway has a square-cut surround, and the windows are mullioned.
Former Collier's Arms public house 53.52026°N 2.05898°W		Late 18th century	A farmhouse that also functioned as a public house with an outbuilding to the right. The building is in sandstone with a slate roof, and has a double-depth plan. The farmhouse has two storeys, three bays, a doorway with a stone surround, and mullioned windows. The outbuilding is taller, with doorways, and a taking-in door in the right gable end. (Note: Street View in July 2012 shows that the building is no longer functioning as a public house, and that the outbuilding has been converted for residential use.)
Pleasant View House and barn 53.51699°N 2.02220°W	—	Late 18th century	A house, cottage and barn, all in stone. The house and cottage both have a tiled roof, two storeys, two bays, and a double depth plan. The house has three storeys, and the cottage has two. Both have doorways with square-cut surrounds and mullioned windows. The barn to the left has a stone-slate roof, quoins, and various openings.
Quickedge House Farmhouse; 53.52408°N 2.04508°W	—	Late 18th century	The farmhouse is in stone, partly rendered, with a slate roof, two storeys, a double-depth plan, and two bays. In the right gable end is a porch and a door with a square-cut surround, and the windows are mullioned.
Top o' the Green; 53.51865°N 2.02242°W	—	Late 18th century	A stone house with a rendered right gable and a stone-slate roof, it has two storeys, a single-depth plan, three bays, and a lean-to on the right. The windows are mullioned.
Bridge at Lock No. 16W; 53.52712°N 2.02989°W		1794–1797	The bridge over the Huddersfield Narrow Canal at the tail of the lock is an accommodation bridge. It is in stone, and consists of a single elliptical arch with voussoirs, a band and parapets with half-round copings. At the west end are square capstones.
Micklehurst Bridge and Lock No. W13; 53.51657°N 2.03727°W	—	1794–1797	The lock and bridge on the Huddersfield Narrow Canal are in stone. The lock has grooves but no gates, and is largely filled in. The bridge has an elliptical arch, a band, and curving side walls with round copings. At the ends are square piers.
Milestone; 53.52314°N 2.03206°W		1794–1797	The milestone is on the towpath of the Huddersfield Narrow Canal. It is in stone, and consists of a rectangular post with a curved head, and is inscribed with "15 miles", the distance from Huddersfield.
Scout Tunnel, north entrance 53.50718°N 2.03962°W		1794–1797	At the north entrance to the tunnel on the Huddersfield Narrow Canal is an elliptical stone arch with a band. The parapet and retaining walls are curved in plan, they have rounded coping, and end in square piers.
Scout Tunnel, south entrance 53.50588°N 2.04159°W		1794–1797	At the south entrance to the tunnel on the Huddersfield Narrow Canal is an elliptical stone arch with a band. The parapet and retaining walls are curved in plan, they have rounded coping, and end in square piers.
Winterford Bridge and Lock No. W14; 53.51977°N 2.03578°W		1794–1797	The lock and bridge on the Huddersfield Narrow Canal are in stone. The lock has grooves but no gates. The bridge is a roving bridge, and has an elliptical arch, a band, and curving side walls with round copings. At one end of it is a square pier, and at the other end are steps.
Black Rock Bridge; 53.50125°N 2.03943°W		1795–1798	An accommodation bridge over the Huddersfield Narrow Canal, it is in stone and consists of a single hump-backed elliptical arch with voussoirs. It has bands, a parapet on the west side with half-round copings, and at the ends are piers with capstones.
71, 73, 75 and 77 Staley Road; 53.51143°N 2.03101°W	—	1802	A row of four houses, No. 77 being the earliest. They are in stone with quoins, and a slate roof. The houses have a double-depth plan, with three storeys and three bays to the left, and two storeys and two bays to the right. The doorway of No. 77 has an initialled and dated lintel. Some windows have been replaced, but most are mullioned.
1 Quickwood; 53.52318°N 2.03832°W	—	Early 19th century	Originally a schoolmaster's house, it is in stone with a slate roof, two storeys and two bays. The central doorway has a square-cut surround and a fanlight, and the windows are 20th-century casements.
7 Anthony Street; 53.51737°N 2.04808°W	—	Early 19th century	A stone house with a stone-slate roof, a double-depth plan, one bay, and three storeys, the top floor originally a workshop. The door with a square-cut surround is in the gable end, the windows are mullioned, and in the east front is a taking-in door.
9, 11 and 13 Anthony Street; 53.51732°N 2.04803°W	—	Early 19th century	A row of three stone houses with a roof of stone-slate and tiles. They have three storeys, a double-depth plan, Nos. 9 and 11 have one bay, and No. 13 has two bays. The windows were originally mullioned and on the upper floors were workshop windows; some mullions have been removed. The doorway has square-cut surrounds.
17 Anthony Street; 53.51721°N 2.04792°W	—	Early 19th century	A stone house with a stone-slate roof, a double-depth plan, two bays, and three storeys, the top floor originally a workshop. The doorways and the windows on the lower two floors have skew stone lintels, and on the top floor the windows are mullioned. In the east front is a taking-in door.
Woodend Toll Bar Cottage; 53.52169°N 2.03518°W	—	Early 19th century	Originally a toll house, later a private house, it is in stone with a hipped slate roof. The house has one storey, it is canted at the front, and has a lean-to at the right. The doors and windows have pointed heads, the door has a fanlight, and the windows are 20th-century casements.
Railway overbridge MVL3/8, Heyrod Footbridge; 53.49778°N 2.04184°W	—	1845–1849	The bridge was built by the Huddersfield and Manchester Railway, later part of the London and North Western Railway, as a footbridge over the line, with steps leading down from the east side. It is built in sandstone and brick, and consists of cast iron beams on abutments that have projecting piers with quoins and pyramidal caps. The parapets are in blue engineering brick with stone coping.
Railway overbridge MVL3/17, Roughtown Road; 53.52217°N 2.03578°W	—	1845–1849	The bridge was built by the Huddersfield and Manchester Railway, later part of the London and North Western Railway, to carry Roughtown Road over the line. It is in buff sandstone, and consists of a single segmental arch between abutments. The bridge has voussoirs, keystones, impost bands, and coped parapets. The abutments curve slightly outwards, and end in piers with pyramidal caps.
Railway overbridge MVL3/20, Wright's Mill; 53.52955°N 2.03369°W	—	1845–1849	The bridge was built by the Huddersfield and Manchester Railway, later part of the London and North Western Railway, to carry a track over the line. It is in buff sandstone, and consists of a single segmental arch. The bridge has voussoirs, keystones, impost bands, a string course, and a chamfered parapet. The abutments curve slightly outwards, and end in piers with pyramidal caps.
Railway tunnel portal, MVL3/11; Scout Tunnel (south end); 53.50784°N 2.04222°W	—	1845–1849	The portal was built by the Huddersfield and Manchester Railway, later part of the London and North Western Railway, at the southern end of Scout Tunnel. It is in buff sandstone, and consists of a single horseshoe arch with voussoirs and a parapet, flanked by polygonal piers and abutments.
Railway underbridge MVL3/10, Manchester Road; 53.50127°N 2.04208°W		1845–1849	The bridge was built by the Huddersfield and Manchester Railway, later part of the London and North Western Railway, to carry the line over Manchester Road (the A635 road). It is in buff sandstone, and consists of a single segmental arch at a slight angle flanked by projecting piers. The bridge has rusticated abutments with canted corners, and an impost band. There are also rusticated voussoirs, parapets with impost bands, and wing walls that curve outwards and end in piers.
Woodend Mill; 53.52031°N 2.03599°W		1848	A combined cotton spinning and weaving mill that was later extended. It is in stone with slate roofs, and has an internal structure of cast iron and brick. The eastern range has five storeys, and sides of 13 and four bays, the western range has four storeys and sides of eight and five bays, and the ranges are linked by a higher block. There are stair, privy and water towers, and a tall circular chimney.
Mossley Hall; 53.51517°N 2.04254°W		1861–1864	Originally a house, later used for a time as the town hall, it is in Italianate style. The building is in stone on a projecting plinth, with rusticated quoins, bands, a modillion eaves cornice, and a slate roof. It has an irregular plan, two storeys, and a front of eight bays. In the second bay is a porch that has square rusticated piers, polished granite columns, arches with keystones, carved panels, a cornice, and a pierced parapet with corner urns. The third bay projects forward and has a gable and pedimented windows. The other windows are sashes, on the ground floor with moulded surrounds, and on the upper floor with round heads.
St John the Baptist's Church; 53.52361°N 2.03745°W		1878–79	A stone church with a slate roof and coped gables. It consists of a nave and chancel under one roof with a clerestory, a south aisle, a north porch, south vestry, and a southwest steeple. The steeple has a tower with an east door, angled buttresses, lancet bell openings, and a broach spire. The windows contain Geometrical tracery, and the east window has five lights.
St George's Church; 53.51673°N 2.04838°W		1879–1882	The tower was added in 1887. The church is in stone and has a slate roof with coped gables and finials. It consists of a nave with a clerestory, north and south aisles, a chancel, and a northwest tower incorporating a porch. The tower has three stages, a stair turret, gabled buttresses, a north door, clock faces, bell openings with triangular pilasters, and an embattled parapet with corner pinnacles. Inside the church is a west gallery.
Lychgate; 53.51750°N 2.04851°W		c. 1920	The lychgate is at the entrance to the churchyard of St George's Church. It has dwarf side walls, a timber frame, and a slate roof. On the tie beam is an inscription and the dates of the First World War.
War memorial 53.51516°N 2.04223°W	—	c. 1920	The war memorial stands in front of the former Town Hall. It has a polished granite base and an inscribed tapering stone plinth, on which is the marble statue of a standing female figure holding a book. The memorial is surrounded by iron railings.
Mossley Cross and barn 53.51476°N 2.05101°W	—	Undated	A pair of houses with a projecting barn to the right and a garage to the left. They are in stone with a stone-slate roof, two storeys, three bays, and a parallel rear range. On the front are a porch and two doorways with square-cut surrounds, one blocked. The windows are mullioned. The barn has a door with a square-cut surround and a blocked cart entry with a segmental head.

== Notes and references ==
=== Sources ===
- Historic England, "Manor House and garden wall, Mossley (1068041)", National Heritage List for England
- Historic England, "Inglenook, Mossley (1162773)", National Heritage List for England
- Historic England, "Overgreen, Mossley (1162802)", National Heritage List for England
- Historic England, "Nos. 7–17 and No. 2 Quickwood, Mossley (1309435)", National Heritage List for England
- Historic England, "Castle Cottages, Mossley (1163105)", National Heritage List for England
- Historic England, "Howard's Farmhouse and adjoining cottages, Mossley (1309453)", National Heritage List for England
- Historic England, "Kershaw Hey Farmhouse, Mossley (1356468)", National Heritage List for England
- Historic England, "Holly Bank Farmhouse and adjoining barn, Mossley (1356442)", National Heritage List for England
- Historic England, "No. 5 Strawberry Lane, Mossley (1068006)", National Heritage List for England
- Historic England, "Carr House, Mossley (1162789)", National Heritage List for England
- Historic England, "Castle Cottage, Mossley (1162793)", National Heritage List for England
- Historic England, "Summerhill Cottage, Mossley (1068042)", National Heritage List for England
- Historic England, "Hillside Farm, Mossley (1309468)", National Heritage List for England
- Historic England, "Oakdene, Mossley (1162864)", National Heritage List for England
- Historic England, "Nos. 7, 9, 11 and 11A Midge Hill, Mossley (1162827)", National Heritage List for England
- Historic England, "No. 9 Broadcarr Lane, Mossley (1068033)", National Heritage List for England
- Historic England, "Alphin House, Mossley (1068035)", National Heritage List for England
- Historic England, "Windy Harbour Farmhouse and shippon, Mossley (1068032)", National Heritage List for England
- Historic England, "No. 6 Strawberry Lane, Mossley (1068008)", National Heritage List for England
- Historic England, "No. 18 Carhill Road and adjoining cottages numbered 1 and 3, Mossley (1162781)", National Heritage List for England
- Historic England, "Nos. 32 and 34 Greenhill Cottages, Mossley (1356440)", National Heritage List for England
- Historic England, "Car Cottages, Right hand cottage only, Mossley (1068034)", National Heritage List for England
- Historic England, "Collier's Arms Public House, Mossley (1375635)", National Heritage List for England
- Historic England, "Pleasant View House and adjoining barn wing, Mossley (1068036)", National Heritage List for England
- Historic England, "Quickedge House Farmhouse, Mossley (1068040)", National Heritage List for England
- Historic England, "Top o' the Green, Mossley (1068039)", National Heritage List for England
- Historic England, "Huddersfield Narrow Canal Milestone at SD 979 030, Mossley (1240125)", National Heritage List for England
- Historic England, "Huddersfield Narrow Canal Micklehurst Bridge and Lock No. W13, Mossley (1356441)", National Heritage List for England
- Historic England, "Huddersfield Narrow Canal Winterford Bridge and Lock No. W14, Mossley (1068037)", National Heritage List for England
- Historic England, "Huddersfield Narrow Canal Lock 16W tail bridge at SD 982 035, Mossley (1261182)", National Heritage List for England
- Historic England, "Huddersfield Narrow Canal Scout Tunnel, north entrance, Mossley (1309457)", National Heritage List for England
- Historic England, "Huddersfield Narrow Canal Scout Tunnel, south entrance, Mossley (1162961)", National Heritage List for England
- Historic England, "Huddersfield Narrow Canal Black Rock Bridge at SD 976 004, Mossley (1261183)", National Heritage List for England
- Historic England, "Nos. 71, 73, 75 and 77 Staley Road, Mossley (1068043)", National Heritage List for England
- Historic England, "No. 7 Anthony Street, Mossley (1162762)", National Heritage List for England
- Historic England, "Nos. 9, 11 and 13 Anthony Street, Mossley (1068031)", National Heritage List for England
- Historic England, "No. 17 Anthony Street, Mossley (1162765)", National Heritage List for England
- Historic England, "No. 1 Quickwood, Mossley (1162836)", National Heritage List for England
- Historic England, "Woodend Toll Bar Cottage, Mossley (1068038)", National Heritage List for England
- Historic England, "Railway overbridge MVL3/8, Heyrod Footbridge, Mossley (1452382)", National Heritage List for England
- Historic England, "Railway underbridge MVL3/10, Manchester Road, Mossley (1452392)", National Heritage List for England
- Historic England, "Railway tunnel portal, MVL3/11 Scout Tunnel (south end), Mossley (1452399)", National Heritage List for England
- Historic England, "Railway overbridge MVL3/17, Roughtown Road, Mossley (1452405)", National Heritage List for England
- Historic England, "Railway overbridge MVL3/20, Wright's Mill, Mossley (1452406)", National Heritage List for England
- Historic England, "Woodend Mill, Mossley (1268030)", National Heritage List for England
- Historic England, "Former Mossley Town Hall, Mossley (1068044)", National Heritage List for England
- Historic England, "Church of St. John the Baptist, Mossley (1356439)", National Heritage List for England
- Historic England, "Church of St. George, Mossley (1068005)", National Heritage List for England
- Historic England, "Lychgate at Church of St. George, Mossley (1356461)", National Heritage List for England
- Historic England, "War Memorial in front of former Town Hall, Mossley (1162871)", National Heritage List for England
- Historic England, "Mossley Cross and adjoining barn, Mossley (1162819)", National Heritage List for England
- Historic England, Listed Buildings
- Hartwell, Clare; Hyde, Matthew; Pevsner, Nikolaus (2004), Lancashire: Manchester and the South-East, The Buildings of England, New Haven and London: Yale University Press, ISBN 0-300-10583-5
