= Mossley Hollins High School =

Coordinates: 53.5196°N 2.0282°W

Location
- Huddersfield Road; Mossley, Ashton-under-Lyne, Greater Manchester, OL5 9DP; England

Information
- Type: Community school
- Local authority: Tameside Metropolitan Borough Council
- Department for Education URN: 106266 Tables
- Ofsted: Reports
- Headteacher: Andrea Din
- Gender: Coeducational
- Age: 11 to 16
- Website: http://www.mossleyhollins.com

Mossley Hollins High School is a coeducational secondary school located in Mossley, in the borough of Tameside, Greater Manchester. The school's original building was opened in the 1960s. Mossley Hollins ranked eighth in Tameside in the most recent league table of school GCSE performance. The school received a rating of "Good" in an Ofsted report made in 2023.

The Department for Education stated that the academic performance of students at Mossley Hollins was amongst the best in England with the GCSE results in English in 2014 placing them in the top 2% of schools nationally.

The school has a new £20 million building which opened to pupils on Wednesday, March 2, 2011.

== School Buses ==
There are 2 Bus services which use the road access into the school. These are:

- 343: Oldham to Hyde via Cooper Street, Mossley, and Carrbrook. This service is operated by Diamond North West under the Bee Network.
- 870: MHHS to Ridge Hill Estate. This service is operated by Go North West under the Bee Network.

The 350 service, as of March 2024, operated by Stagecoach Manchester under the Bee Network between Ashton and Oldham, also provides a general link.
