= Harridge Pike =

Hill in United Kingdom

Coordinates: 53.49580°N 2.01051°W

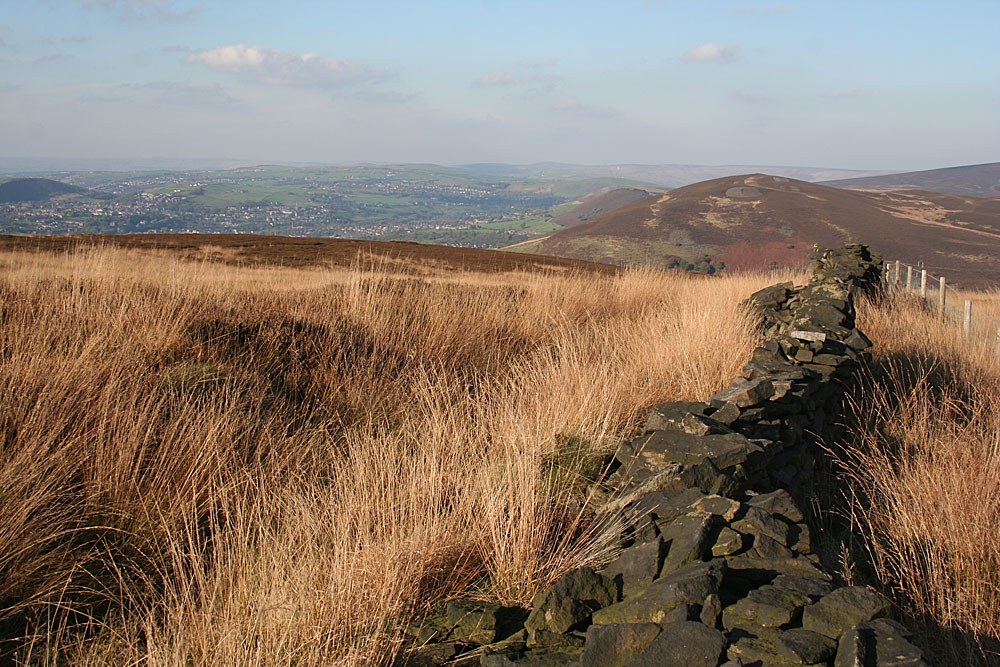
- Harridge Pike from the south

Highest point
- Elevation: 395 m (1,296 ft)
- Prominence: c. 40 m
- Listing: (none)

Geography
- Location: Greater Manchester, England
- Parent range: Peak District, Pennines
- OS grid: SJ994999
- Topo map: OS Landranger 109

Harridge Pike is a hill situated within the boundaries of Stalybridge, Greater Manchester just outside the Peak District National Park. Its western flank rises from the valley of the River Tame to a height of 395 metres. To the east, the pike falls away more gradually to Swineshaw Moor which, above the Swineshaw reservoirs, rises to Irontongue Hill, a broad shoulder of Hoarstone Edge. Since 2004, the moorland in the area of the pike has been classed as access land. There is a recognised All Trails walk. From the summit of Harridge Pike, a view is afforded of the middle section of the Tame valley and the whole of the town of Stalybridge, large swathes of the eastern suburbs of Manchester and beyond to Manchester city centre, where its town hall is visible. On exceptionally clear days the mountains of Snowdonia are visible. There is a bronze age barrow, described as a cairn, to the east of the summit.
