= Mossley railway station =

Railway station in Greater Manchester, England

Coordinates: 53.515°N 2.042°W

Mossley
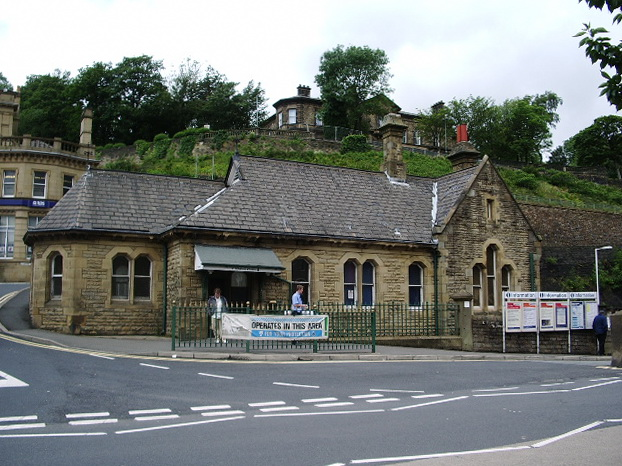

General information
- Location: Mossley, Tameside; England
- Grid reference: SD973020
- Managed by: Northern Trains
- Platforms: 2

Other information
- Station code: MSL
- Classification: DfT category E

History
- Opened: 1 August 1849

Passengers
- 2020/21: ▼76,552
- 2021/22: ▲0.237 million
- 2022/23: ▼0.199 million
- 2023/24: ▲0.209 million
- 2024/25: ▲0.260 million
Location
Notes
- Passenger statistics from the Office of Rail and Road

Mossley railway station in Mossley, Greater Manchester, England, is on the Huddersfield Line 9.9 miles (16 km) north-east of Manchester Victoria and is managed by Northern, which do not provide any services to or from this station. Only TransPennine Express trains stop here.

== Facilities ==
The station is a small, two-platform station, with the only on-site services being a ticket office. Outside of office-opening times, tickets must be purchased on the train or prior to travel. There is a waiting room on the southbound platform and a waiting shelter on the northbound side. Train running details are provided by telephone and timetable posters.

Disabled access to the station is limited, with wheelchair provision only being made for the Huddersfield to Manchester platform. As the Manchester to Huddersfield platform is accessible through a single staircase, disabled passengers often find it easier to travel on to Huddersfield and then disembark at Mossley on the opposite platform when the train makes its return journey.

== Services ==
Since the May 2018 timetable change, TransPennine Express is the sole operator serving the station, despite the station still being managed by Northern Trains. TransPennine Express provide an hourly express service (including Sundays) to Huddersfield eastbound and to Stalybridge & Manchester Piccadilly westbound. Many services continue eastbound to York via Wakefield Kirkgate.

Passengers wishing to travel to Manchester Victoria and points west must change at Stalybridge.

Preceding station	National Rail	Following station
Stalybridge	TransPennine Express; North TransPennine	Greenfield

== Planned upgrade ==
The Transpennine route through the station is being modernised and upgraded. It is planned as part of the upgrade that electrification of the line through the station will occur. The plans will also see the station relocated further to the north, with longer (150m) platforms, additional car parking and improved accessibility by means of a footbridge fitted with lifts and a new entrance from Manchester Road.
