= Mossley =

Town in Tameside, Greater Manchester, England

Coordinates: 53.5147°N 2.0387°W

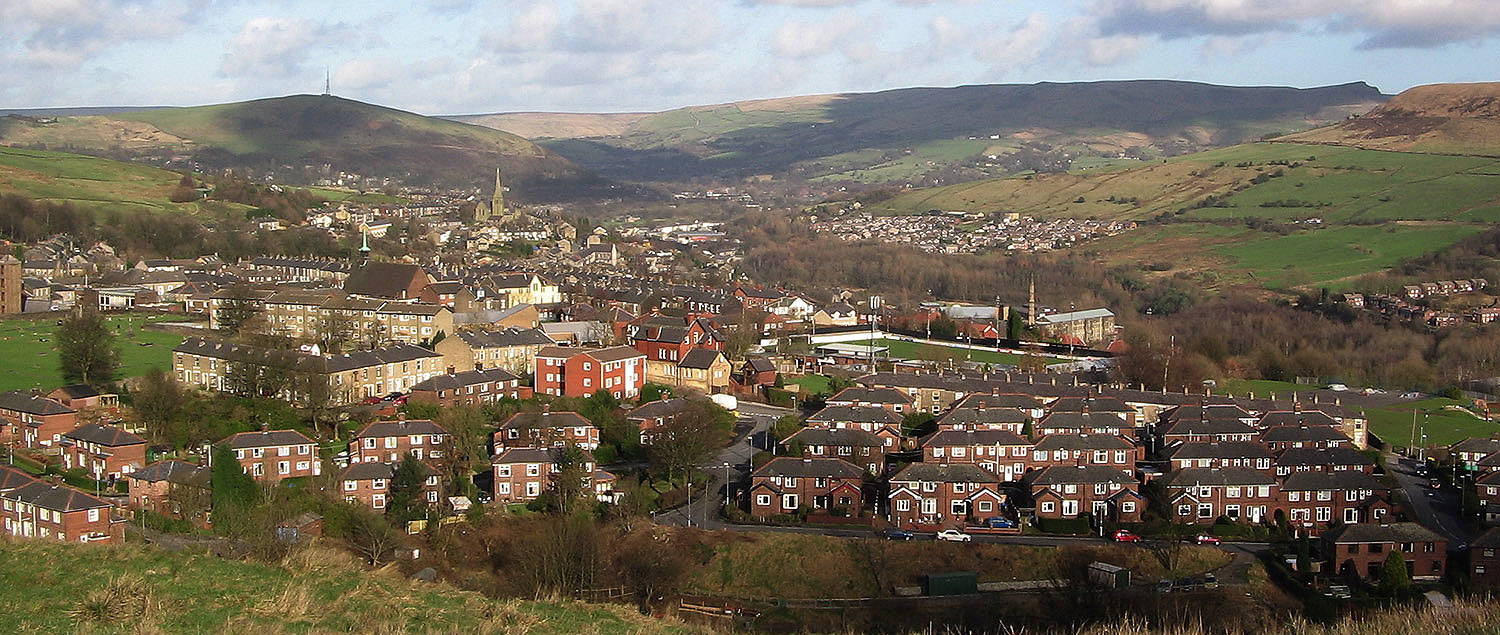
- View of Mossley

- Location within Greater Manchester
- Population: 11,557 (Parish, 2021); 11,410 (Built up area, 2021)
- OS grid reference: SD9702
- Civil parish: Mossley
- Metropolitan borough: Tameside
- Metropolitan county: Greater Manchester
- Region: North West
- Country: England
- Sovereign state: United Kingdom
- Post town: ASHTON-UNDER-LYNE
- Postcode district: OL5
- Dialling code: 01457
- Police: Greater Manchester
- Fire: Greater Manchester
- Ambulance: North West
- UK Parliament: Stalybridge and Hyde
- Website: www.mossley-council.co.uk

Mossley (/ˈmɒzli/) is a town and civil parish in Tameside, Greater Manchester, England, in the upper Tame Valley and the foothills of the Pennines, 3 miles (4.8 km) south-east of Oldham and 9 miles (14.5 km) east of Manchester.

The town grew up straddling the three historic counties of Lancashire, Cheshire and Yorkshire. It was placed entirely in Lancashire in 1889, and became part of Greater Manchester in 1974. At the 2021 census, the built-up area had a population of 11,410 and the parish population was 11,557.

== Toponymy ==
Mossley means "a woodland clearing by a swamp or bog". The earliest record of the name here dates from around 1319.

== History ==
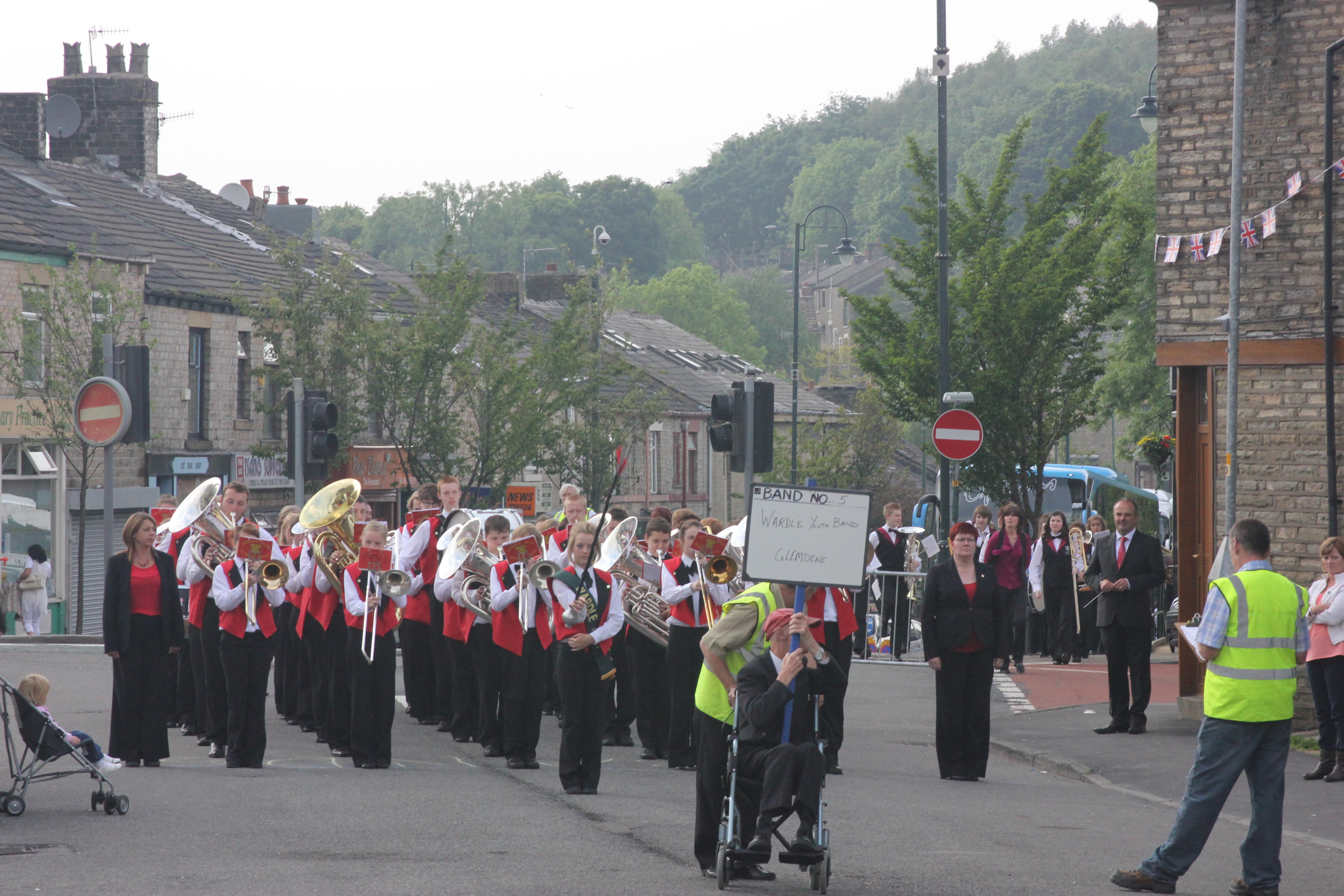
2012 Whit Friday Band Contest in Market Street

Mossley—alongside neighbouring Stalybridge and Uppermill in Saddleworth—helped launch the annual Whit Friday Band Contest, an internationally known brass band event, which began in 1884 in Uppermill.

=== Public venue ===
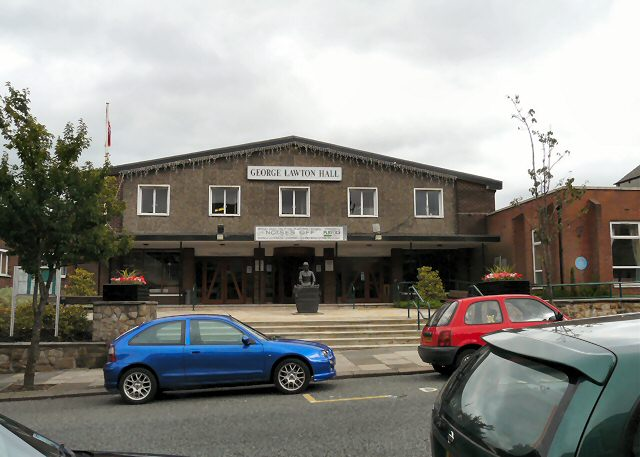
George Lawton Hall, Stamford Street

George Lawton, the son of magistrate and alderman John Lawton, inherited a family fortune and when he died in August 1949, he left the bulk of his wealth to the people of Mossley. Part of his £77,760 wealth (equivalent to £2,400,000 in 2025) was left to build a public meeting place, the George Lawton Hall, which opened in 1960.

== Governance ==
There are two tiers of local government covering Mossley, at civil parish (town) and metropolitan borough level: Mossley Town Council and Tameside Metropolitan Borough Council. Tameside Council is a member of the Greater Manchester Combined Authority, which is led by the directly elected Mayor of Greater Manchester. There is a Mossley ward for elections to Tameside council, which covers a slightly larger area than the parish.

Mossley Town Council generally meets at the Methodist Church on Chapel Street.

=== Administrative history ===
The original hamlet of Mossley was in the parish of Ashton-under-Lyne in Lancashire, but lay very close to the boundaries with Cheshire and Yorkshire. As the town grew during the Industrial Revolution in the 19th century, the urban area came to straddle the three counties. To the east, it extended into the townships of Stayley and Tintwistle, both of which formed part of the parish of Mottram-in-Longdendale in Cheshire. To the north, it extended into the township of Saddleworth, which was the part of Rochdale parish which lay in the West Riding of Yorkshire (the rest of Rochdale parish was in Lancashire).

In 1864, a Mossley local government district was established, with a newly defined boundary that straddled the three counties and four townships. The district was administered by an elected local board.

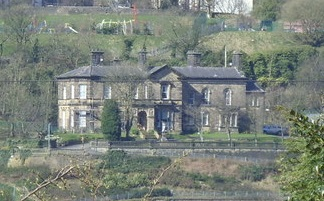
Mossley Town Hall

Mossley was granted a municipal charter on 13 March 1885, which converted the local government district into a municipal borough, with a borough council replacing the board. The borough council bought Mossley Hall in 1891 to serve as its headquarters, renaming it the Town Hall.

Elected county councils were established in 1889 under the Local Government Act 1888. The 1888 Act also directed that urban sanitary districts which straddled county boundaries, as the borough of Mossley did, were to be placed entirely in the county which had the majority of the district's population. Mossley was therefore placed entirely in Lancashire. The borough continued to straddle four townships until 1894, when a single township or civil parish of Mossley was created covering the same area as the borough.

The borough of Mossley was abolished in 1974 under the Local Government Act 1972. The area became part of the Metropolitan Borough of Tameside in Greater Manchester.

No successor parish was created for Mossley at the time of the 1974 reforms, and so it became unparished. A new civil parish of Mossley was established in 1999, with its council taking the name Mossley Town Council. The parish is divided into three wards for town council elections, called Cheshire, Lancashire, and Yorkshire, reflecting the historic county boundaries.

The town's unofficial coat of arms includes Cheshire's sheaf of corn, Lancashire's red rose and Yorkshire's white rose to signify the historic demarcation.

=== Parliament ===
From 1918 to 1950 the town gave its name to the Mossley constituency which returned a Member of Parliament; for most of the period, the MP was Austin Hopkinson, who was notable for being elected as an Independent candidate. The town is now represented by the MP for Stalybridge and Hyde.

== Geography ==
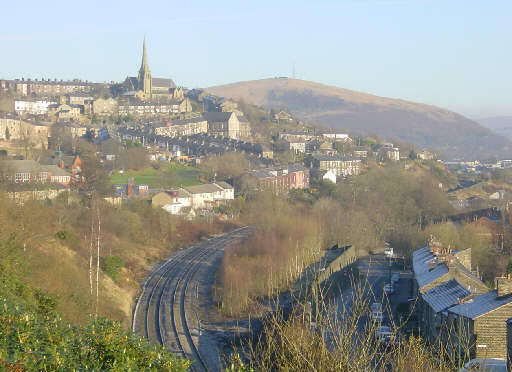
View of Mossley from near Mossley railway station.

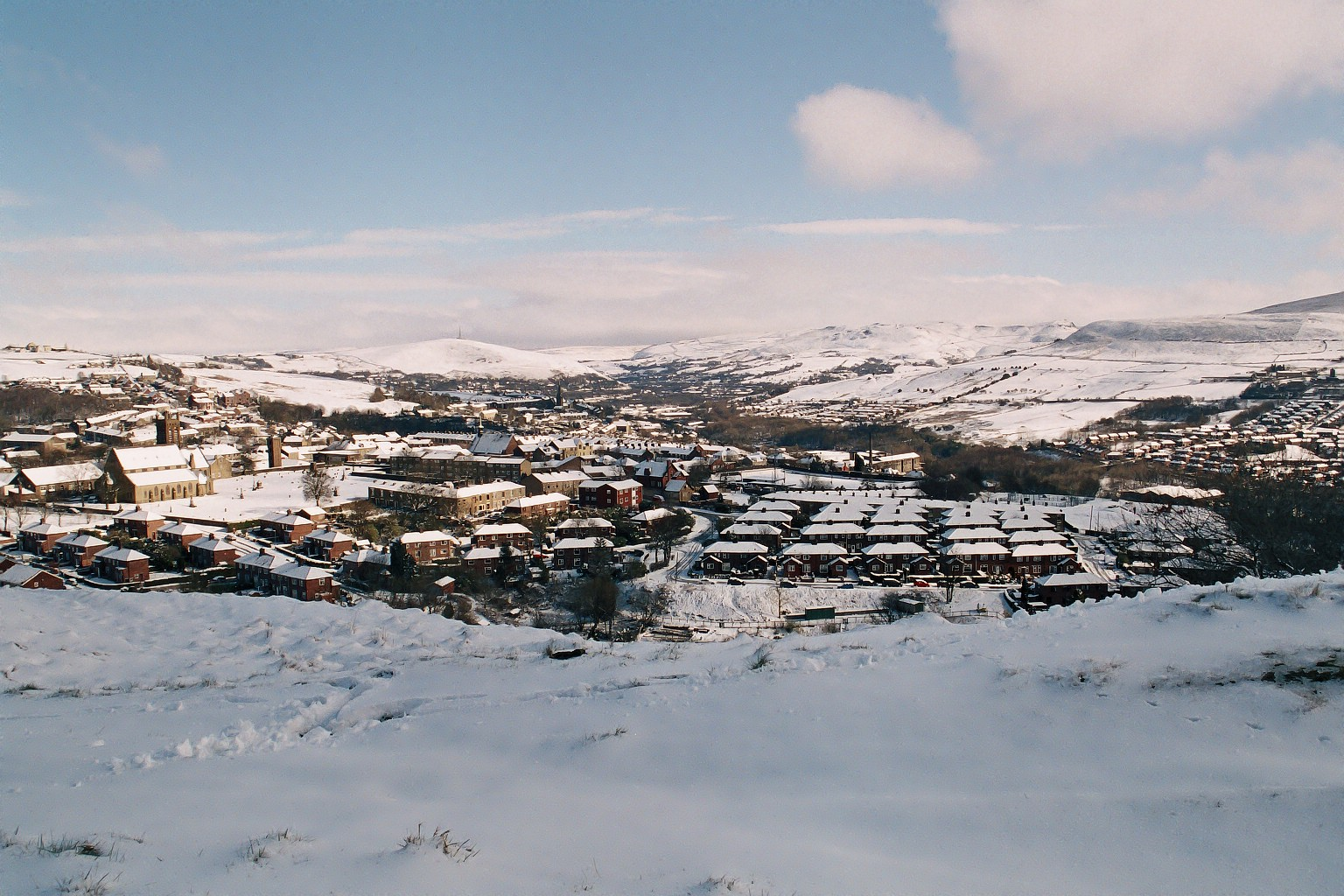
Mossley's proximity to the Saddleworth Moor and the Pennines makes it prone to precipitation.

Mossley lies amongst the foothills of the Pennines, on the western edge of Saddleworth Moor.

== Churches ==
The ecclesiastical parishes correspond to the boundaries of the historic counties:

- St. Joseph's Church, in the centre of Mossley, is Roman Catholic
- All Saints' Church is in Micklehurst, aligned to Cheshire
- St John the Baptist Church is of Yorkshire
- St George's Church is of Lancashire

== Education ==
=== Primary schools ===
- St. Joseph's R.C. Primary School
- Livingstone Primary School
- St. George's Primary School
- Milton St. John's Primary School
- All Saints Micklehurst

=== Secondary school ===
- Mossley Hollins High School

== Transport ==
Mossley railway station is sited on the Huddersfield line. Services are operated by TransPennine Express to locations including Manchester Piccadilly, Stalybridge, Huddersfield, Leeds and Hull.

Bus routes that serve Mossley are operated under the Bee Network brand by Diamond North West, and Stagecoach Manchester, on contract to TfGM.

A tram network operated by the SHMD Joint Board ran lines through Mossley from 1904 to 1945, until their replacement by buses. The second-generation tramway Manchester Metrolink currently terminates at nearby Ashton-under-Lyne for connections to the city centre.

== Media ==
Local news and television programmes are provided by BBC North West and ITV Granada. Television signals are received from the Winter Hill TV transmitter and one of the two local relay transmitters (Saddleworth and Brock Bottom).

Local radio stations are BBC Radio Manchester, Capital Manchester and Lancashire, Heart North West, Smooth North West, Greatest Hits Radio Manchester & The North West, and Tameside Radio, a community based station.

The local newspaper is the Tameside Reporter, published on Thursdays.

== Twinning ==
Mossley's French twin town is Hem, situated near Lille, in the Nord département.

== Sport ==
Local sport teams include Mossley A.F.C., Mossley Mayhem Softball Club, Mossley Athletic JFC, Mossley Juniors F.C., Mossley AFC Running Club and Micklehurst Cricket Club.

== Fairtrade ==
Mossley's Town Council passed a resolution in November 2009 to make Mossley a Fairtrade Town. A group of local campaigners and activist have started the Fairtrade Mossley group to make 2010 the year that Mossley becomes a Fairtrade Town.

== Notable people ==
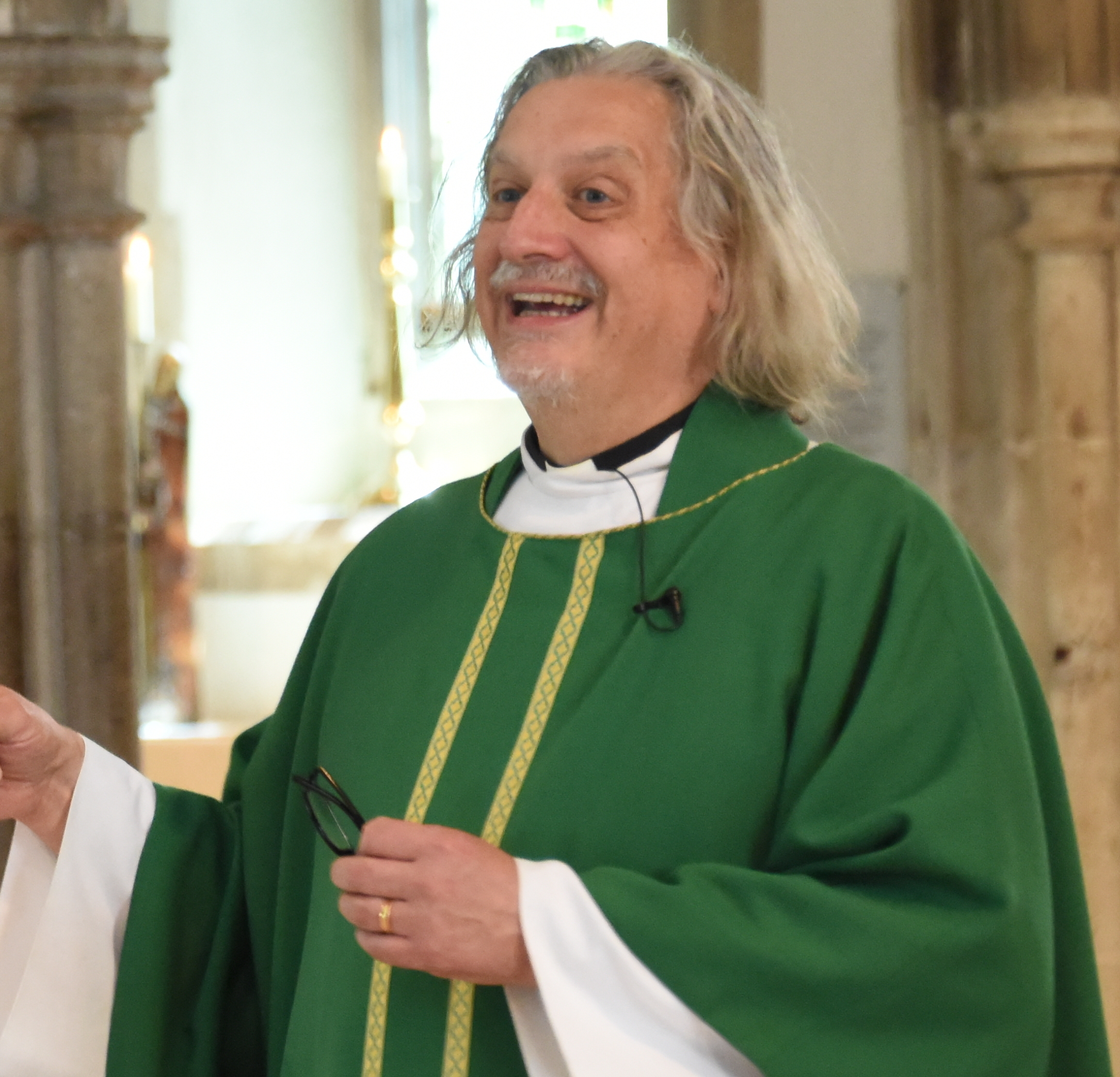
Nicholas Henshall, 2018

- Dame Sarah Lees (1842–1935), politician and philanthropist; first female councillor elected in Lancashire (1907–19) and the first female Mayor of Oldham (1910–11)
- Austin Hopkinson (1879–1962), industrialist and MP who represented Mossley as an independent 1918/1929 and 1931/1945.
- Ernest Sykes (1885–1949), Army private, recipient of the Victoria Cross
- Ray Hill (1939–2022), a leading figure in the British far right who became an anti-fascist informant
- Peter McGarr (born 1953), classical composer, recipient of British Composer Award, works in the English experimental tradition, lives in Mossley.
- Nicholas Henshall (born 1962), an Anglican priest and author, Dean of Chelmsford from 2014 to 2023.
- Melanie Sykes (born 1970), TV presenter and model, co-hosted Today with Des and Mel with Des O'Connor
- Jon Courtenay (born 1973), singer, pianist, entertainer and comedian, winner of Britain's Got Talent series 14 in 2020
- Gerard Kearns (born 1984), actor, played Ian Gallagher in the comedy-drama series Shameless.
- Cabbage (2014-2021), a local post punk rock band, included Lee Broadbent and Eoghan Clifford

=== Sport ===
- Billy Dennis (1896–1952), footballer who played over 370 games, including 166 for Chesterfield
- Geoff Clayton (1938–2018), first-class and List A cricketer, played 274 First-class cricket games
- Alan Walker (born 1959), footballer who played over 380 games including 151 for Gillingham

== See also ==
- Listed buildings in Mossley
