= List of I Zingari first-class cricketers =

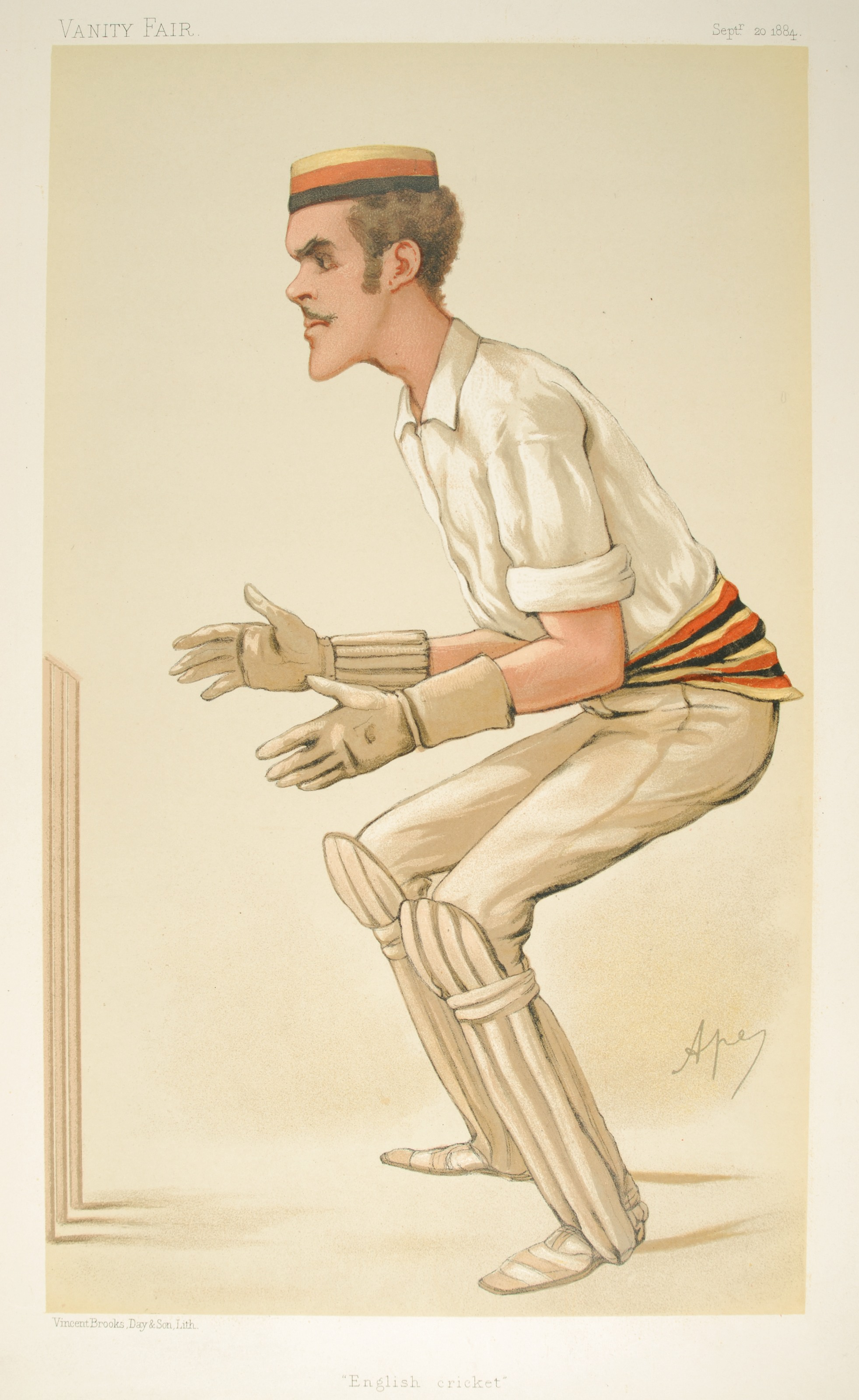
Caricature of Alfred Lyttelton keeping wicket for I Zingari

I Zingari are a wandering amateur cricket club. Founded on 4 July 1845 by three Old Harrovians, it is one of the oldest cricket clubs still in existence. The purpose of the club was to nurture amateur cricket following the rise of professionalism, which had resulted in most clubs and counties employing at least one professional player to strengthen their team. I Zingari teams were chosen carefully, and such was their strength in the late 19th and early 20th centuries that a number of their matches were considered to be of first-class status. I Zingari Australia played senior club cricket for a few seasons after their formation in 1888, before being excluded from Electorate cricket. They have not played any first-class cricket.

I Zingari played numerous fixtures each season from 1845, primarily facing Eton College and Harrow School in the 1840s, and later playing more against stronger opposition; the Gentlemen of England and county teams became frequent opponents. In 1866 they took on the 'Gentlemen of the South' at St Lawrence Ground, Canterbury. This match is the first of their fixtures to be considered of first-class status. I Zingari lost by 121 runs to the Gentlemen, whose team included W.G. Grace and two of his brothers. I Zingari's next first-class match came eleven years later, when they played Yorkshire County Cricket Club as part of the Scarborough Festival. They competed in the festival for each of the following thirteen seasons – with the exception of 1883 – and played Yorkshire on seven occasions, the 'Gentlemen of England' six times and the touring Australians twice. They played two further first-class fixtures, both against the 'Gentlemen of England' at Lord's Cricket Ground, in 1895 and 1904.

In 17 first-class fixtures, 85 different cricketers appeared for I Zingari. Lancashire and England Test cricketer A. G. Steel appeared for the club on the most occasions, playing ten matches between 1879 and 1895. His 52 wickets are the most taken for the team by any player. Middlesex captain A. J. Webbe scored the most runs for I Zingari, accumulating 612 during his seven matches. He also scored more centuries for the amateur team than any other player, passing 100 on two occasions, while the highest score for I Zingari was 147, by Teddy Wynyard. Alfred Lyttelton, one of three Lyttelton brothers to play for the team, was the most successful wicket-keeper, claiming 17 dismissals.

Many members of the upper classes played for the team throughout their first-class years. Among these were Prince Christian Victor of Schleswig-Holstein, the only member of the British royal family to have played first-class cricket. Members of the peerage also played for I Zingari, including Ivo Bligh, 8th Earl of Darnley, Beilby Lawley, 3rd Baron Wenlock, Martin Hawke, 7th Baron Hawke and George Harris, 4th Baron Harris. At least three players were Members of Parliament, chief among them Alfred Lyttelton and Edward Stanhope who were both members of the Privy Council of the United Kingdom. Cecil Wilson, who appeared for the team twice, also served as an Anglican Bishop of Melanesia and Bishop of Bunbury.

== Key ==
General

- † – Wicket-keeper
- First – Year of debut
- Last – Year of latest game
- Mat – Number of matches played

Batting

- Inn – Number of innings batted
- NO – Number of innings not out
- Runs – Runs scored in career
- HS – Highest score
- 100 – Centuries scored
- 50 – Half-centuries scored
- Avg – Runs scored per dismissal
- * – Batsman remained not out

Bowling

- Balls – Balls bowled in career
- Wkt – Wickets taken in career
- BBI – Best bowling in an innings
- Ave – Average runs per wicket

Fielding

- Ca – Catches taken
- St – Stumpings taken

== Cricketers ==
No.	Name	First	Last	Mat	Inn	NO	Runs	HS	100	50	Avg	Balls	Wkt	BBI	Ave	Ca	St	Refs
No.	Name	First	Last	Mat	Batting							Bowling				Fielding		Refs
1	Robert Antrobus	1866	1866	1	2	0	2	2	0	0	1.00	32	1	1/10	10.00	0	0	
2	Henry Arkwright	1866	1866	1	2	0	6	6	0	0	3.00	92	3	2/7	17.33	1	0	
3	Charles Buller	1866	1866	1	2	0	39	28	0	0	19.50	8	1	1/12	12.00	1	0	
4	Fleetwood Edwards	1866	1866	1	2	1	39	27*	0	0	39.00	26	1	1/8	8.00	0	0	
5	Harvey Fellows †	1866	1866	1	2	0	11	11	0	0	5.50	32	0	–	–	4	1	
6	Robert Fitzgerald	1866	1866	1	2	0	10	7	0	0	5.00	16	0	–	–	2	0	
7	Henry Langley	1866	1866	1	2	1	4	4	0	0	4.00	0	–	–	–	1	0	
8	Alfred Lubbock	1866	1866	1	2	0	3	3	0	0	1.50	12	0	–	–	2	0	
9	Edgar Lubbock	1866	1866	1	2	0	2	2	0	0	1.00	40	1	1/4	4.00	1	0	
10	William Maitland	1866	1866	1	2	0	52	36	0	0	26.00	100	4	4/29	7.25	0	0	
11	Joseph McCormick	1866	1866	1	2	0	24	23	0	0	12.00	196	4	3/43	7.25	0	0	
12	William Parnell	1866	1866	1	2	0	0	0	0	0	0.00	176	6	5/42	12.66	2	0	
13	Charles Francis	1877	1879	3	6	0	26	13	0	0	4.33	224	4	3/25	29.50	2	0	
14	Walter Hadow	1877	1884	4	8	0	109	48	0	0	13.62	204	1	1/30	85.00	5	0	
15	Reginald Hargreaves	1877	1885	2	4	2	17	9*	0	0	8.50	20	1	1/14	14.00	4	0	
16	Robert Henderson	1877	1878	2	4	0	12	6	0	0	3.00	489	19	7/12	8.52	0	0	
17	Alfred Lyttelton †	1877	1887	8	15	1	268	50	0	1	19.14	84	0	–	–	8	9	
18	Charles Marriott	1877	1882	4	7	2	101	29	0	0	20.20	28	1	1/?	?	3	0	
19	William Middleton	1877	1882	5	10	1	66	22	0	0	7.33	176	3	2/39	26.33	2	0	
20	Thomas Pearson	1877	1877	1	2	0	37	31	0	0	18.50	0	–	–	–	2	0	
21	Arthur Ridley	1877	1878	2	4	0	58	23	0	0	14.50	104	3	3/10	8.00	3	0	
22	Alexander Webbe	1877	1890	7	13	2	612	126	2	2	55.63	166	4	3/74	27.25	1	0	
23	Herbert Webbe	1877	1879	3	6	1	96	34*	0	0	19.20	0	–	–	–	2	0	
24	Walter Forbes	1878	1884	5	9	0	213	80	0	2	23.66	951	16	6/32	17.87	3	0	
25	Spencer Gore	1878	1879	2	4	1	19	15*	0	0	6.33	37	1	1/9	26.00	1	0	
26	Harry Verelst †	1878	1878	1	1	0	12	12	0	0	12.00	0	–	–	–	1	2	
27	Ivo Bligh	1879	1881	3	6	1	170	70*	0	1	34.00	0	–	–	–	1	2	
28	Alfred Evans	1879	1885	4	6	1	123	55	0	1	24.60	268	5	3/?	83.00	0	0	
29	Edward Stanhope	1879	1879	1	2	0	1	1	0	0	0.50	0	–	–	–	1	2	
30	Allan Steel	1879	1895	10	18	1	376	65	0	1	22.11	2321	52	7/61	21.84	7	0	
31	Arnald de Grey	1880	1880	1	1	0	1	1	0	0	1.00	64	0	–	–	1	0	
32	William Kenyon-Slaney	1880	1880	1	2	1	0	0*	0	0	0.00	0	–	–	–	0	0	
33	Beilby Lawley	1880	1880	1	1	0	3	3	0	0	3.00	0	–	–	–	1	0	
34	Robert Lyttelton	1880	1880	1	2	0	2	2	0	0	1.00	0	–	–	–	0	0	
35	Charles Studd	1880	1882	4	7	0	147	30	0	0	21.00	654	26	6/31	10.04	6	0	
36	George Studd	1880	1886	7	12	2	349	86	0	3	34.90	8	1	1/10	10.00	8	0	
37	Herbert Whitfeld	1880	1889	5	10	0	108	63	0	1	10.80	30	0	–	–	4	0	
38	George Foljambe	1881	1881	1	2	1	1	1*	0	0	1.00	0	–	–	–	0	0	
39	Francis Gore	1881	1881	1	2	1	0	0*	0	0	0.00	0	–	–	–	2	0	
40	William Law	1881	1882	2	4	0	17	15	0	0	4.25	8	0	–	–	0	0	
41	Edward Lyttelton	1881	1882	3	5	0	139	56	0	1	27.80	44	0	–	–	1	0	
42	Edmund Carter	1882	1882	1	2	1	9	5*	0	0	9.00	?	?	1/?	?	0	0	
43	Lord Harris	1882	1888	4	7	0	109	47	0	0	15.57	80	3	2/?	40.00	0	0	
44	Richard Mitchell	1882	1882	2	3	0	50	32	0	0	16.66	0	–	–	–	0	3	
45	Bunny Lucas	1882	1904	2	3	0	50	26	0	0	16.66	28	0	–	–	3	0	
46	Stanley Christopherson	1884	1885	2	3	2	14	14	0	0	14.00	116	0	–	–	2	0	
47	Clement Cottrell	1884	1884	1	2	0	15	15	0	0	7.50	228	5	5/72	23.60	0	0	
48	Percy de Paravicini	1884	1889	5	9	3	81	27*	0	0	13.50	136	0	–	–	4	0	
49	William Patterson	1884	1884	1	2	0	36	26	0	0	18.00	0	–	–	–	1	0	
50	Edward Hadow	1885	1890	4	7	0	180	75	0	1	25.71	187	6	2/6	14.33	3	0	
51	Lord Hawke	1885	1904	5	9	1	173	47	0	0	21.62	0	–	–	–	0	0	
52	Gerald Portal	1885	1885	1	1	0	6	6	0	0	6.00	123	4	4/55	13.75	1	0	
53	James Walker	1885	1890	6	11	1	182	111	1	0	18.20	0	–	–	–	3	0	
54	Cecil Wilson	1885	1886	2	2	0	122	86	0	1	61.00	32	1	1/23	23.00	0	0	
55	Charles Clarke	1886	1890	2	4	0	3	2	0	0	0.75	0	–	–	–	4	1	
56	Henry Forster	1886	1890	5	10	2	83	37	0	0	10.37	719	23	7/37	16.82	6	0	
57	Harry Leadbeater	1886	1886	1	1	0	27	27	0	0	27.00	16	1	1/29	29.00	2	0	
58	Edward Tylecote †	1886	1886	1	1	0	15	15	0	0	15.00	0	–	–	–	2	2	
59	Henry Tylecote	1886	1886	1	1	0	18	18	0	0	18.00	20	1	1/16	16.00	1	0	
60	Prince Christian Victor	1887	1887	1	2	0	35	35	0	0	17.50	0	–	–	–	1	0	
61	Harry de Paravicini	1887	1888	2	4	2	48	28*	0	0	24.00	0	–	–	–	1	0	
62	Lovick Friend	1887	1887	1	2	0	15	9	0	0	7.50	0	–	–	–	1	0	
63	William Garforth	1887	1887	1	2	0	0	0	0	0	0.00	12	0	–	–	1	0	
64	Francis Lacey	1887	1887	1	2	0	25	20	0	0	12.50	124	3	3/75	25.00	0	0	
65	Leslie Balfour †	1888	1888	1	2	0	8	7	0	0	4.00	0	–	–	–	0	1	
66	Coote Hedley	1888	1890	3	6	1	52	29	0	0	10.40	524	19	6/36	14.00	5	0	
67	Lord George Scott	1888	1888	1	2	0	2	2	0	0	1.00	0	–	–	–	1	0	
68	Robert Frank	1889	1889	1	2	0	40	24	0	0	20.00	0	–	–	–	1	0	
69	Hylton Philipson †	1889	1895	3	6	3	61	16	0	0	20.33	0	–	–	–	2	0	
70	George Vernon	1889	1895	3	6	0	32	17	0	0	5.33	0	–	–	–	2	0	
71	Henry Mordaunt	1890	1890	1	2	0	6	5	0	0	3.00	45	5	5/17	3.40	1	0	
72	Lawrence Bathurst	1895	1895	1	2	0	10	6	0	0	5.00	162	2	2/53	49.50	0	0	
73	Hugh Bromley-Davenport	1895	1895	1	2	0	1	1	0	0	0.50	205	3	3/100	44.00	0	0	
74	Herbie Hewett	1895	1895	1	2	0	73	51	0	1	36.50	0	–	–	–	1	0	
75	Gerald Mordaunt	1895	1895	1	2	0	61	42	0	0	30.50	0	–	–	–	2	0	
76	Tim O'Brien	1895	1895	1	2	0	25	20	0	0	12.50	0	–	–	–	0	0	
77	Andrew Stoddart	1895	1895	1	2	0	130	92	0	1	65.00	116	0	–	–	1	0	
78	Teddy Wynyard	1895	1904	2	4	0	299	147	1	2	74.75	25	0	–	–	1	0	
79	Bernard Bosanquet	1904	1904	1	2	1	70	66*	0	1	70.00	281	11	7/83	13.72	0	0	
80	Foster Cunliffe	1904	1904	1	1	0	12	12	0	0	12.00	144	2	2/58	48.00	0	0	
81	John Hartley	1904	1904	1	1	1	15	15*	0	0	–	96	1	1/48	48.00	1	0	
82	Christopher Heseltine	1904	1904	1	0	–	–	–	–	–	–	96	2	2/28	29.00	1	0	
83	Ledger Hill	1904	1904	1	2	0	38	38	0	0	19.00	12	0	–	–	0	0	
84	Eustace Mordaunt	1904	1904	1	1	0	5	5	0	0	5.00	168	2	1/34	37.00	1	0	
85	Arthur Newton †	1904	1904	1	1	0	13	13	0	0	13.00	0	–	–	–	1	2	
86	Ernest Steel	1904	1904	1	2	0	122	111	1	0	61.00	144	2	2/63	39.50	0	0	
