= De Grey (surname) =

de Grey is a surname, and may refer to:

- Arnald de Grey (1856–1889), English cricketer
- Aubrey de Grey (born 1963), English gerontologist
- George de Grey, 3rd Baron Walsingham (1776–1831), British peer and army officer
- George de Grey, 8th Baron Walsingham (1884–1965), British soldier and peer
- Henrietta Frances de Grey (1784–1848), Anglo-Irish political hostess and philanthropist
- Henry de Grey (1155–1219), English courtier
- Ida de Grey (1368–1426), Cambro-Norman noblewoman
- Sir John de Grey (died 1266), English soldier and high sheriff
- John de Grey, 1st Baron Grey de Rotherfield (1300–1359), English soldier and courtier
- Nigel de Grey (1886–1951), British codebreaker
- Reginald de Grey, 1st Baron Grey de Wilton (c.1240–1308), English nobleman
- Richard de Grey (died c.1271), English landowner
- Roger de Grey (1918–1995), British landscape painter
- Slim De Grey, Australian actor, musician and comedian
- Spencer de Grey (born 1944), British architect
- Thomas de Grey (1680–1765), British Member of Parliament
- Thomas de Grey (1717–1781), British Member of Parliament
- Thomas de Grey, 2nd Baron Walsingham (1748–1818), British politician
- Thomas de Grey, 2nd Earl de Grey (1781–1859), British politician
- Thomas de Grey, 4th Baron Walsingham (1788–1839), British peer and cleric
- Thomas de Grey, 5th Baron Walsingham (1804–1870), British peer
- Thomas de Grey, 6th Baron Walsingham (1843–1919), English politician and amateur entomologist
- William de Grey (1652–1687), English landowner and Member of Parliament
- William de Grey, 1st Baron Walsingham (1719–1781), British lawyer, judge and politician

== See also ==
- Grey (surname)
- de Gray
