= Thomas de Grey, 5th Baron Walsingham =

British peer (1804–1870)

Thomas de Grey, 5th Baron Walsingham (6 July 1804 – 31 December 1870), of Merton Hall, Norfolk, was a British peer.

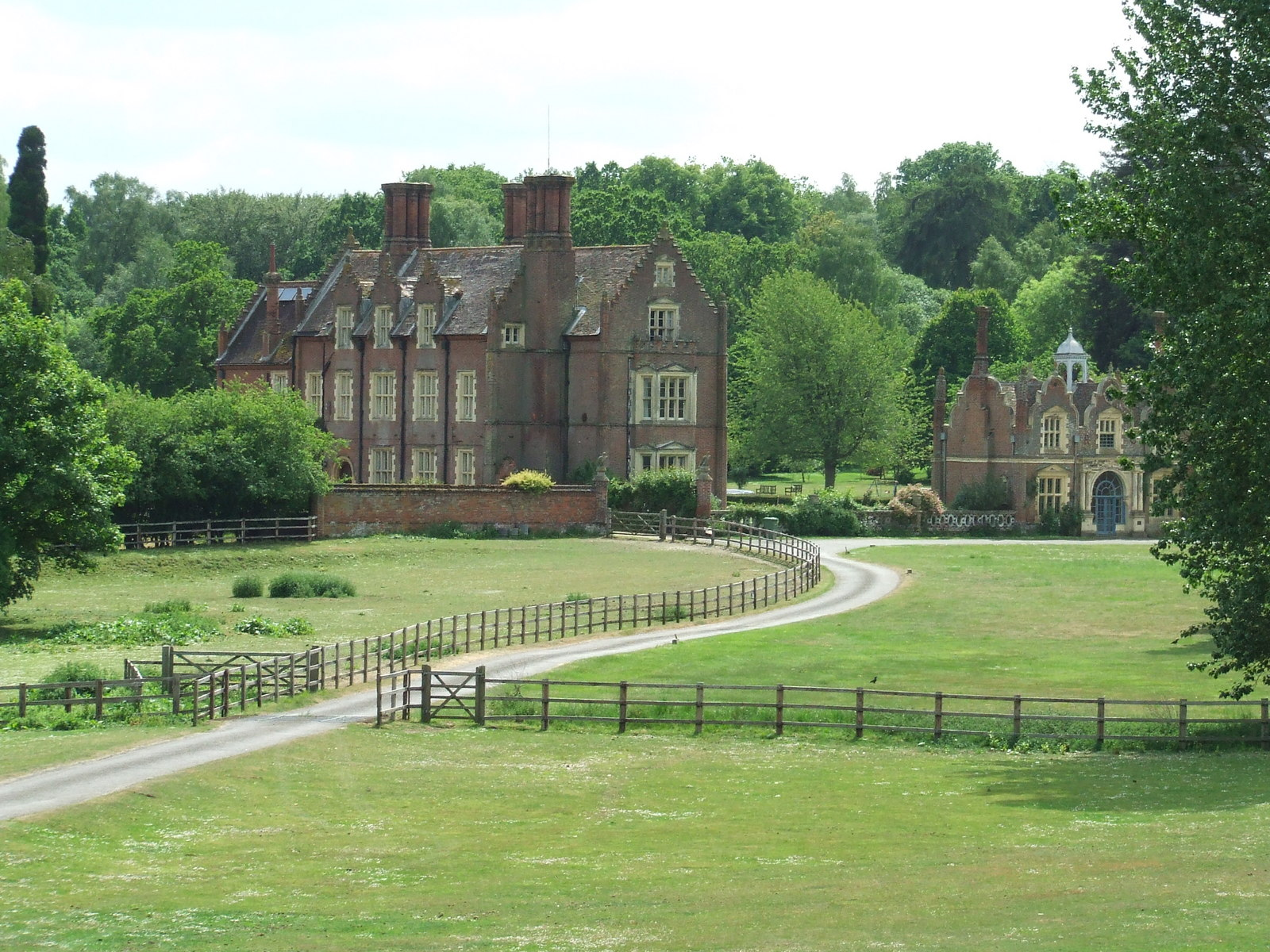
Merton Hall, the family seat in Norfolk

== Life ==
Grey was born in Chelsea, the eldest son of the Venerable Thomas de Grey, Archdeacon of Surrey, a clergyman who in 1831 succeeded his brother George de Grey, 3rd Baron Walsingham, as the result of a house fire.

He studied law at Lincoln's Inn and became a barrister in 1827. In 1839 he succeeded his father as Lord Walsingham.

He married firstly in 1842 Augusta Louisa Frankland-Russell, the daughter and coheiress of Sir Robert Frankland-Russell, 7th Baronet, of Thirkleby, Yorkshire, with whom he had a son, Thomas de Grey, 6th Baron Walsingham (29 July 1843 - 3 Dec 1919).

After the death of his wife, Walsingham married secondly the Hon. Emily Elizabeth Julia Thellusson, daughter and coheiress of John Thellusson, 2nd Baron Rendlesham, with whom he had another four sons and four daughters:

- John Augustus de Grey, 7th Baron Walsingham (21 Mar 1849 - 21 Mar 1929)
- Hon. Emily Augusta Louisa (18 Mar 1852 - 26 Jan 1912) married the Hon. Alfred Chetwynd-Talbot, son of Henry John Chetwynd-Talbot, 18th Earl of Shrewsbury. They had three sons, and two daughters.
- Hon. Beatrice (16 Nov 1853 - 16 Oct 1927). Like her sister, she too married a son of Lord Shrewsbury, Admiral Walter Cecil Carpenter on 10 February 1887. They had no children.
- Hon. Mabel (28 Mar 1855 - 6 Apr 1942). Unmarried.
- Rev. Hon. Arnald (11 Sep 1856 - 15 Nov 1889) married Margaret Maria Ponsonby, daughter of Rt. Hon. Sir Spencer Cecil Ponsonby-Fane. They had two sons, Michael and Nigel de Grey.
- Hon. Robert Baynard (20 Mar 1858 - 7 Jan 1930). Unmarried.
- Hon. Elizabeth Odeyne (30 Aug 1860 - 4 Dec 1947) married Rev. Francis Hodgson, son of Sir Arthur Hodgson KCMG. They had one daughter, Avis.

In 1870 Walsingham committed suicide at Merton, Norfolk.

== Arms ==
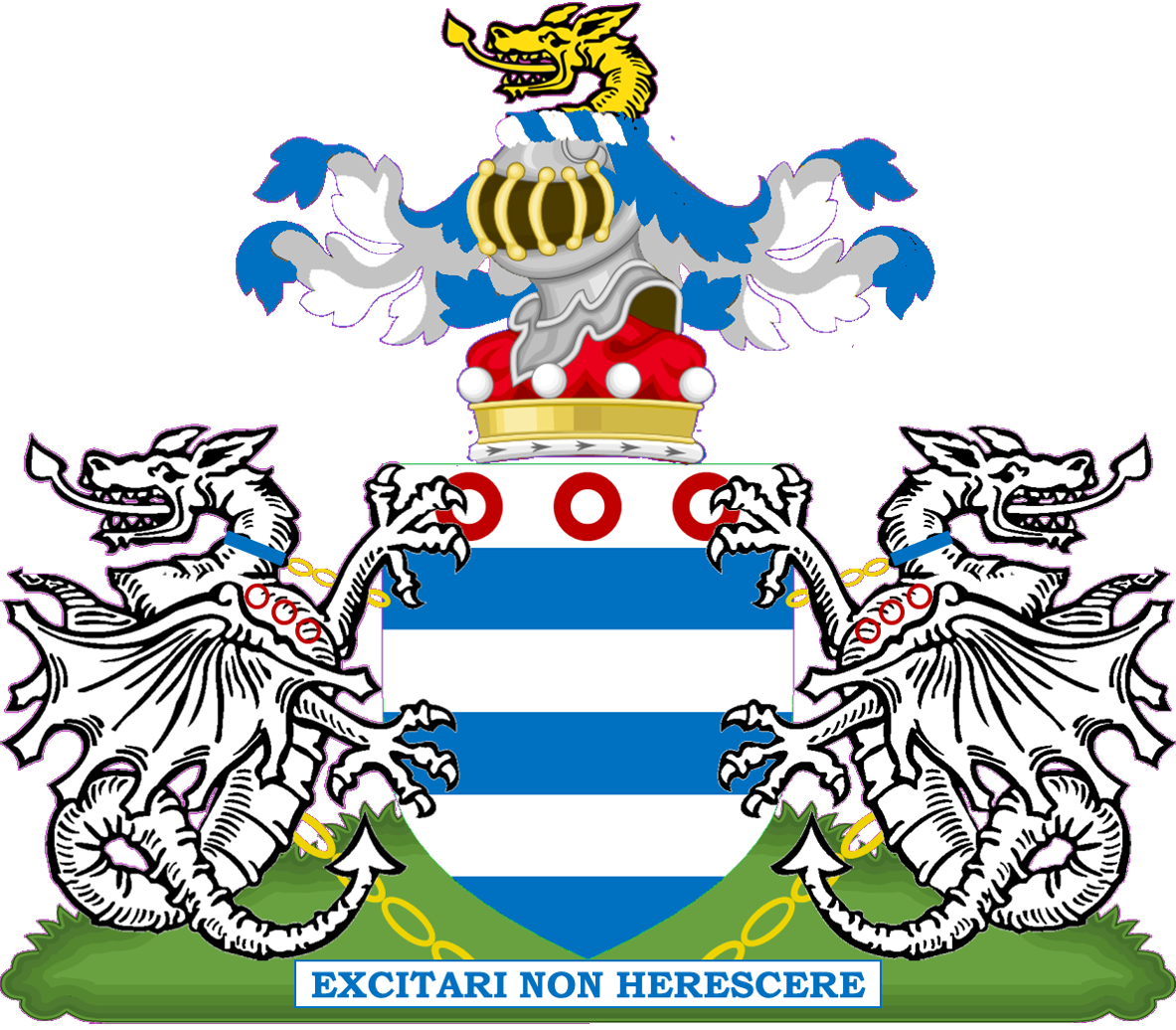
Arms of Grey, Baron Walsingham

The arms of the Lords Walsingham are blazoned

Barry of six argent and azure, in chief three annulets gules; crest: A wyvern's head or; supporters: Two wyverns regardant argent collard azure chained or and charged on the breast with three annulets gules; motto: Excitari Non Hebescere ("to be spirited not inactive")

Peerage of Great Britain
Preceded by Thomas de Grey	Baron Walsingham; 1839–1870	Succeeded by Thomas de Grey
