= Thomas de Grey, 4th Baron Walsingham =

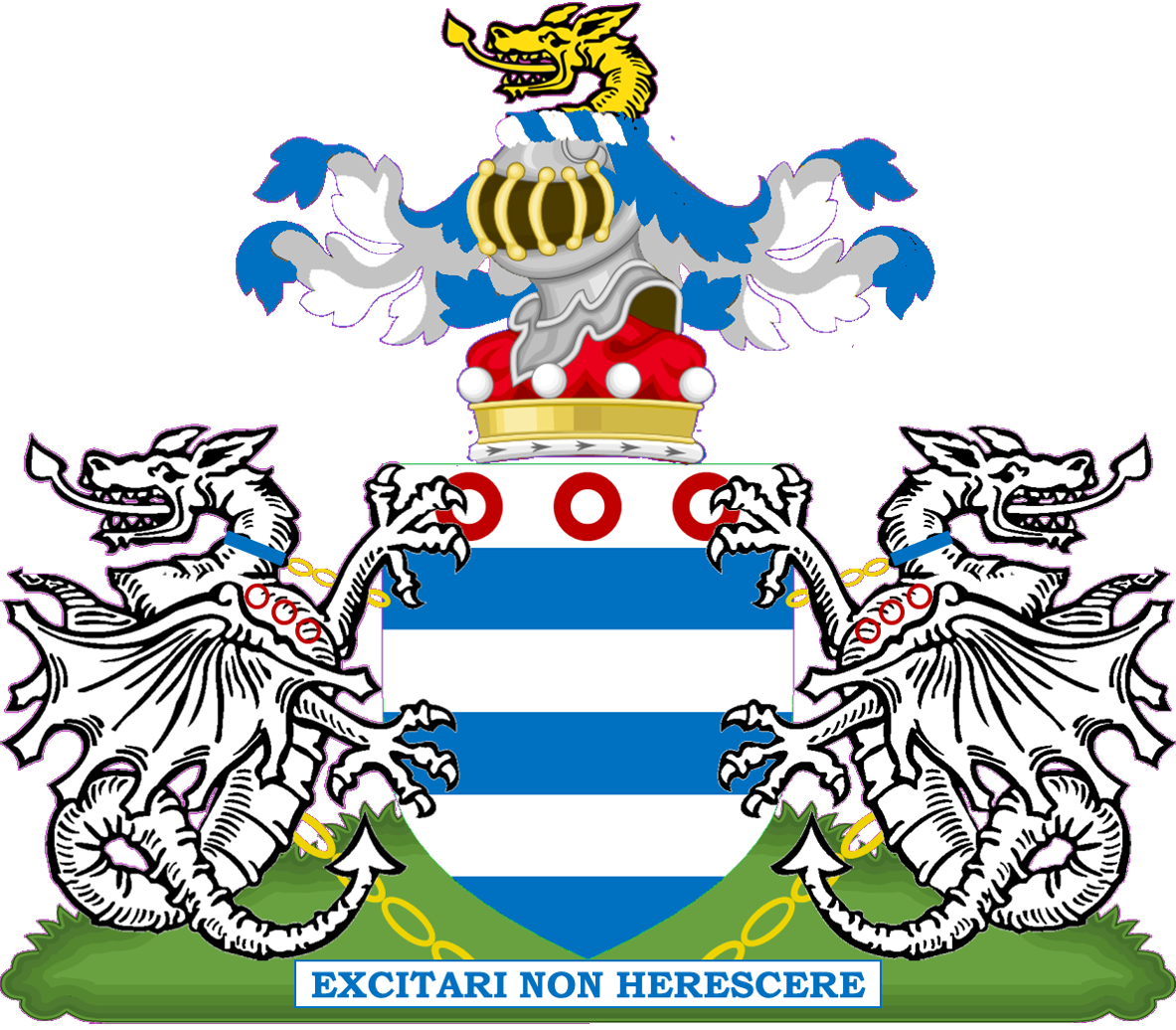
Arms of Grey, Barons Walsingham: Barry of six argent and azure, in chief three annulets gules; crest: A wyvern's head or; supporters: Two wyverns regardant argent collard azure chained or and charged on the breast with three annulets gules; motto: Excitari Non Herescere ("to be spirited not inactive")

Thomas de Grey, 4th Baron Walsingham (Chelsea 10 April 1778 – Merton, Norfolk, 8 September 1839) was Archdeacon of Winchester from 1807 until 1814; and then of Surrey from 1814 until his death.

The 2nd son of Thomas de Grey, 2nd Baron Walsingham, he was educated at Eton and St John's College, Cambridge. He held livings at Aston Abbotts, Merton, Bishopstoke, Fawley, Weeke and Calbourne.

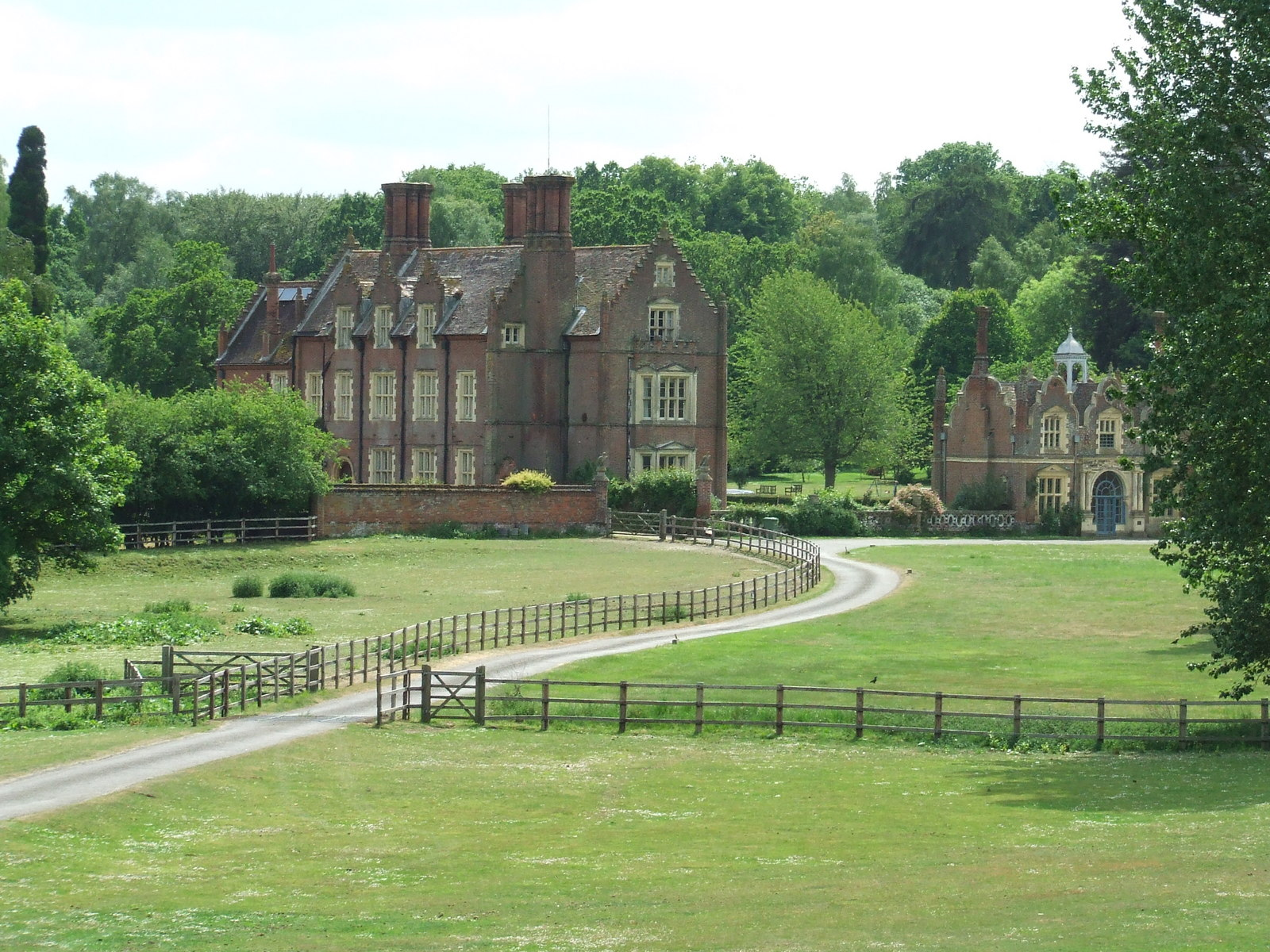
Merton Hall - de Grey family seat in Norfolk

He succeeded his brother George de Grey, 3rd Baron Walsingham, in 1831 when the latter was killed with his wife as the result of a house fire at his London Home, inheriting the barony and the family seat of Merton Hall, Norfolk.

He died in 1839 and was buried at Merton, Norfolk. He had married in 1802 Elizabeth North, the daughter of Rt Rev Hon Brownlow North DD, Bishop of Winchester. They had six sons and three daughters. He was succeeded by his eldest son Thomas de Grey, 5th Baron Walsingham.

== Notes ==
Church of England titles
Preceded by Matthew Woodford	Archdeacon of Winchester; 1807–1814	Succeeded by Augustus Legge
Preceded by John Carver	Archdeacon of Surrey; 1814–1839	Succeeded by Samuel Wilberforce
Peerage of Great Britain
Preceded by George de Grey	Baron Walsingham; 1831–1839	Succeeded by Thomas de Grey
