= John Ponsonby-Fane =

English cricketer and malacologist

Personal information
- Full name: John Henry Ponsonby-Fane
- Born: 21 July 1848; Westminster, Middlesex, England
- Died: 11 September 1916 (aged 68); Yeovil, Somerset, England
- Batting: Right-handed
- Bowling: Right-arm underarm slow
- Role: Occasional wicket-keeper
- Relatives: Spencer Ponsonby-Fane (father); Richard Ponsonby-Fane (son); John Ponsonby (uncle); Frederick Ponsonby (uncle); Charles Ponsonby (cousin); Arnald de Grey (brother-in-law)

Domestic team information
- Years: Team
- 1869: Marylebone Cricket Club

Career statistics
Competition	First-class
Matches	7
Runs scored	161
Batting average	20.12
100s/50s	–/1
Top score	53
Balls bowled	446
Wickets	13
Bowling average	16.07
5 wickets in innings	1
10 wickets in match	–
Best bowling	5/37
Catches/stumpings	9/2
- Source: Cricinfo, 27 June 2023

John Henry Ponsonby-Fane (21 July 1848 – 11 September 1916) was an English first-class cricketer and noted malacologist.

The son of Spencer Ponsonby-Fane and Louisa Anne Rose Lee Dillon, he was born at Westminster in July 1848. He was educated at Harrow School, where he was in the cricket eleven. After leaving Harrow he became a clerk in the Privy Council office. Ponsonby-Fane played first-class cricket for the Marylebone Cricket Club (MCC) against Kent during the Canterbury Cricket Week in 1869. He would go on to play six further first-class matches for the Gentlemen of Marylebone Cricket Club between 1870 and 1875. He was described by Scores and Biographies as "a good, steady batsman, a most effective lob-bowler, and an excellent wicket-keeper". This was translated into first-class cricket with Ponsonby-Fane scoring 161 runs in his seven first-class matches, with a highest score of 53. His lob-bowling yielded him 13 wickets at an average of 16.07 and with best figures of 5 for 37, which came for Gentlemen of Marylebone Cricket Club against Kent in 1874. He kept wicket once in first-class cricket, for the MCC in 1869, with him making two stumpings. Besides playing first-class cricket, Ponsonby-Fane also played minor matches for I Zingari, which had been founded by his father and uncle, Frederick Ponsonby, amongst others.

After leaving the service of the Privy Council, he became a partner in the bank Herries, Farquhar & Co., remaining with the bank following its acquisition by Lloyds. He had married the eldest daughter of Harvie Farquhar in 1875. From a young age he had developed a keen interest in mollusca. His collection mainly consisted of Helicoid land shells, Bulimoid groups and terrestrial operculates. He was a regular student at the British Museum and he assisted Edgar Smith at the museum with the shell gallery. Ponsonby-Fane was a member of the Malacological Society of London and acted as its treasurer for several years. He was well known within the society as a source of great knowledge in the field, which he regularly imparted. He wrote very little material on the subject, but did contribute notes on the land shells of Gibraltar, British fauna, descriptions of four Helicoids, and critical remarks on Libera and Sculptaria. He mainly wrote in association with James Cosmo Melvill, assisting him in the description of over 200 new species. He also collaborated with Ernest Ruthven Sykes, helping to describe new species from Tenerife and Buru. He was in good health until after he was 30, after which his health gradually deteriorated, with Ponsonby-Fane suffering from neuritis of the spine. As his health deteriorated his participation in the Malacological Society declined, especially so in his later years. He died at Brympton d'Evercy near Yeovil in September 1916. Several family members were also first-class cricketers, including his son Richard.
