= Walter Forbes (disambiguation) =

Walter Forbes (born 1942/43) is an American business manager and Federal prisoner.

Walter Forbes may also refer to:

- Walter Forbes, 18th Lord Forbes (1798–1868), Scottish peer
- Walter Forbes (cricketer) (1858–1933), English cricketer
