= Richard Ponsonby-Fane =

British academic, author, specialist of Shinto, and Japanologist

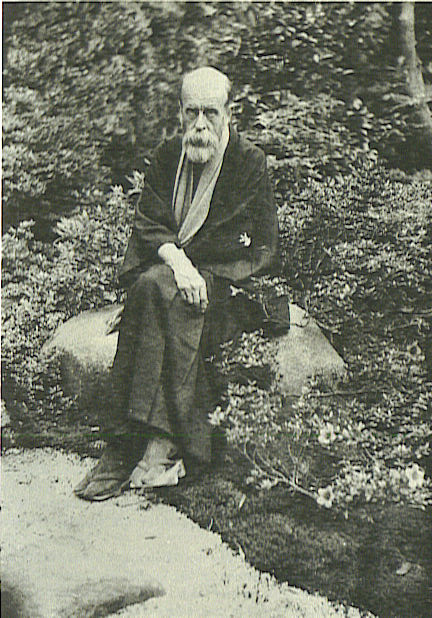
Richard Ponsonby-Fane, shortly before his death in 1937. The scarf around his neck is a constant feature of photos taken in his later years. It was said to have been hand-made by Empress Teimei, and offered to him as a token of friendship.

Richard Arthur Brabazon Ponsonby-Fane (8 January 1878 – 10 December 1937) was a British academic, author, specialist of Shinto and Japanologist.

== Early years ==
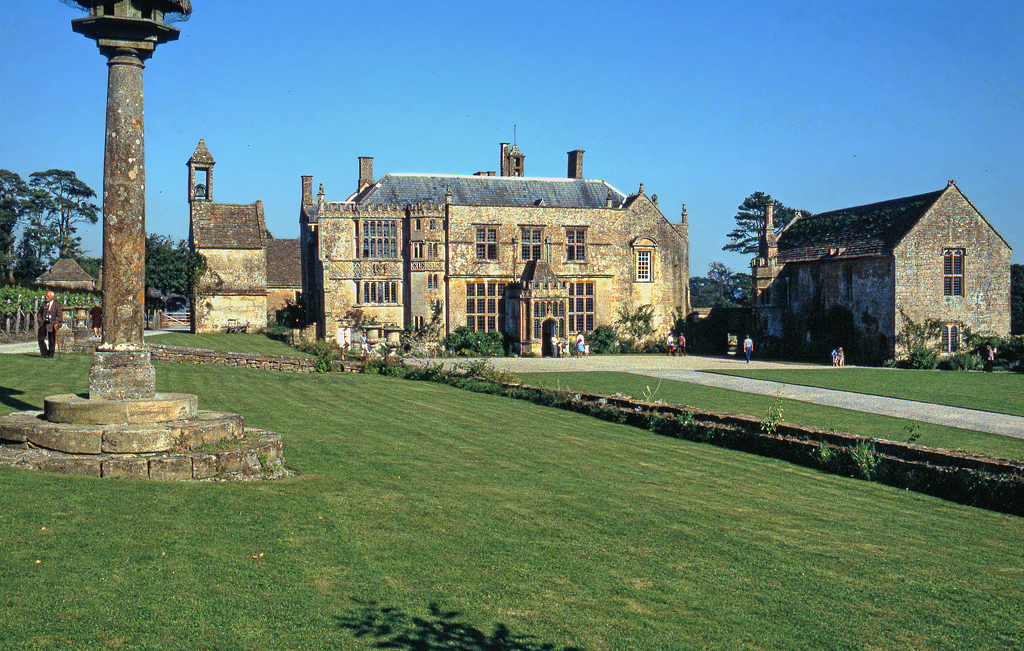
A view of the Ponsonby-Fane family home, Brympton d'Evercy, in Somerset.

Richard Arthur Brabazon Ponsonby was born at Gravesend on the south bank of the Thames in Kent, England to John Henry and Florence Ponsonby. His boyhood was spent in the family home in London and at the Somerset country home, Brympton d'Evercy, of his grandfather, Spencer Ponsonby-Fane. Ponsonby was educated at Harrow School.

He added "Fane" to his own name when he inherited Brympton d'Evercy in 1916 after the deaths of both his grandfather and father.

== Career ==
In 1896, Ponsonby traveled to Cape Town to serve as Private Secretary to the Governor of the British Cape Colony. For the next two decades, his career in the British Empire's colonial governments spanned the globe. He worked closely with a number of colonial leaders as private secretary to the Governor of Natal (1896), to the Governor of Trinidad and Tobago (1898), to the Governor of Ceylon (1900), and to the Governor of Hong Kong (1903). He was re-posted to Natal in 1907; and in 1910, he was private secretary to the Governor of Fiji. Also in 1910 he played a single first-class cricket match for the Marylebone Cricket Club. In 1915–1919, he was re-posted as private secretary to the Governor of Hong Kong.

In addition to his government duties in Hong Kong, he began lecturing at the University of Hong Kong in 1916; and his association with the faculty of the university continued until 1926.

After 1919, Ponsonby-Fane became a permanent resident of Japan, traveling four months of the year to Hong Kong for lectures at the Crown colony's university.

In 1921, when the Japanese Crown Prince visited Hong Kong en route to Europe, Ponsonby-Fane was introduced as his interpreter.

When Emperor Shōwa was enthroned in 1928, he was the only non-Japanese guest who was invited to witness the ceremonies from in front of the palace's Kenreimon gate. In 1930, when HIH Prince Takamatsu and his wife traveled to Europe, Ponsonby-Fane sailed on the same ship; and he was invited to attend all the welcoming receptions for them in England.

In 1932, Ponsonby-Fane built a Japanese-style home in one of the northern suburbs of Kyoto. In the last decades of his life, he was always photographed with a long woolen scarf draped around his shoulders. This unique scarf was said to be hand-knit by Dowager Empress Teimei, the widow of Emperor Taishō; and he highly valued this unique token of personal favour.

Ponsonby-Fane died at home in Kyoto in December 1937.

== Selected works ==
In an overview of writings by and about Richard Ponsonby-Fane, OCLC/WorldCat lists roughly 74 works in 136 publications in 2 languages and 1,443 library holdings.

This list is not finished; you can help Wikipedia by adding to it.

- The Imperial Family of Japan, 1915
- The Capital and Palace of Heian (Heian-kio oyobi Daidairi), 1924
- The Vicissitudes of Shinto, 1931
- The Nomenclature of the N. Y. K. Fleet, 1931
- Kamo Mioya Shrine, 1934
- Kyoto: the Old Capital of Japan, 794-1869, 1956
- The Imperial House of Japan, 1959
- Sovereign and Subject, 1962
- Studies in Shinto and Shrines, 1962
- The Vicissitudes of Shinto, 1963
- Visiting Famous Shrines in Japan, 1964

== Honours ==
- Order of the Rising Sun.
- Order of the Sacred Treasure, 1921.
- University of Hong Kong, Honorary Doctor of Laws, 1926.

== See also ==
- Private Secretary to the Sovereign
