= Henry Arkwright =

English cricketer

Personal information
- Full name: Henry Arkwright
- Born: 16 December 1837; Hampton Court Castle, Herefordshire, England
- Died: 13 October 1866 (aged 28); Mont Blanc, France
- Batting: Right-handed
- Bowling: Underarm fast

Domestic team information
- Years: Team
- 1858: Cambridge University
- 1859–1866: I Zingari
- 1861–1866: Marylebone Cricket Club
- First-class debut: 13 May 1858 Cambridge University v Cambridge Town Club
- Last First-class: 10 August 1866 MCC v Gentlemen of Kent

Career statistics
Competition	First-class
Matches	17
Runs scored	144
Batting average	4.96
100s/50s	0/0
Top score	26
Balls bowled	1806
Wickets	97
Bowling average	11.34
5 wickets in innings	10
10 wickets in match	2
Best bowling	9/43
Catches/stumpings	16/–
- Source: CricketArchive, 31 October 2010

Henry Arkwright (16 December 1837 – 13 October 1866) was an English amateur first-class cricketer. He made seventeen appearances between 1858 and 1866. He is one of only three cricketers to have taken 18 first-class wickets in a match.

== Early life and cricket career ==
Henry Arkwright was born in Hampton Court Castle, Herefordshire, the fourth son of John Arkwright, and the great-grandson of Sir Richard Arkwright. He was educated at Harrow School, and played in the school cricket team for three years, from 1855 to 1857. He twice played in the annual match against Eton, claiming nine wickets in an innings victory in 1855, and eight wickets in a ten wicket victory in 1857. He also represented the school against the Marylebone Cricket Club (MCC) in 1856, claiming nine wickets. On completion of his studies at Harrow, he went up to Trinity College, Cambridge. He made his first-class debut for the university during his first year, taking five wickets in his only bowling innings against Cambridge Town Club. He claimed six wickets in an innings against the MCC in his next match, but failed to take any wickets in the University Match against Oxford.

The following year he made his debut for I Zingari, representing the amateur side against Harrow School, and a few weeks later played for the Gentlemen of England against the Gentlemen of Kent, the England side being captained by Spencer Ponsonby, one of the I Zingari founders. Arkwright continued to represent I Zingari and other amateur sides, making occasional first-class appearances for representative amateur sides such as Gentlemen of the North, Gentlemen of the MCC and he twice played for the Gentlemen against the Players. His best bowling performance was for the Gentlemen of the MCC in 1861, when he claimed nine wickets in each innings against the Gentlemen of Kent, finishing with 18 wickets in the match. At the time, only William Lillywhite had taken that many wickets in a first-class match, doing so in the Gentlemen v Players fixture of 1837. Since then, only Jim Laker has achieved the total, surpassing it when he claimed 19 wickets for England against Australia in 1956.

== Military career ==
In 1858, he joined the 84th Regiment of Foot as an Ensign. He was promoted to Lieutenant in 1860, and then again to Captain in 1865. He served as aide-de-camp to James Hamilton, 1st Duke of Abercorn, Lord Lieutenant of Ireland in 1866.

== Death ==
Arkwright, along with his guide and two porters, was killed in an avalanche on Mont Blanc on 13 October 1866. The bodies of those with Arkwright were soon found and buried, but his remains were not discovered for 31 years. The body, which was lacking both feet and the head, was in places well preserved; the right hand was "marvellously life-like, the ice had even preserved in it the red tint of the blood". The remains were interred in the little Protestant church at Chamonix.
