= Lynedoch Gardiner =

British Army general

General Sir Henry Lynedoch Gardiner KCVO CB (12 February 1820 – 15 December 1897) was a British Army general who served in the Royal Artillery and was on the Royal Commission for the Defence of Canada in 1861.

== Military service ==
He was the son of General Sir Robert Gardiner and Caroline Mary Macleod. He was born at his grandfather Lieutenant General Sir John Macleod's house in St James's Park. He was educated at the Royal Military Academy, Woolwich, entering the Royal Artillery in 1837, and subsequently serving in Canada and in India.

He was Equerry to Queen Victoria from 1872 to 1896. The Queen granted him use of Thatched House Lodge in Richmond Park as a grace and favour residence. From 1896 to 1897 he was King of Arms of the Order of the Bath and Commandant of the Horse Artillery.

== Surviving photograph and diaries ==
There is a photograph of Gardiner and his daughter in the Royal Collection. His diaries – covering the years 1837 and 1839–68 – are held at Cambridge University Library.

Heraldic offices
Preceded by Admiral Lord Frederic Kerr	King of Arms of the Order of the Bath; 1896–1897	Succeeded by Major General Sir John Carstairs McNeil
