= Merton Hall, Norfolk =

Country house in Merton, England

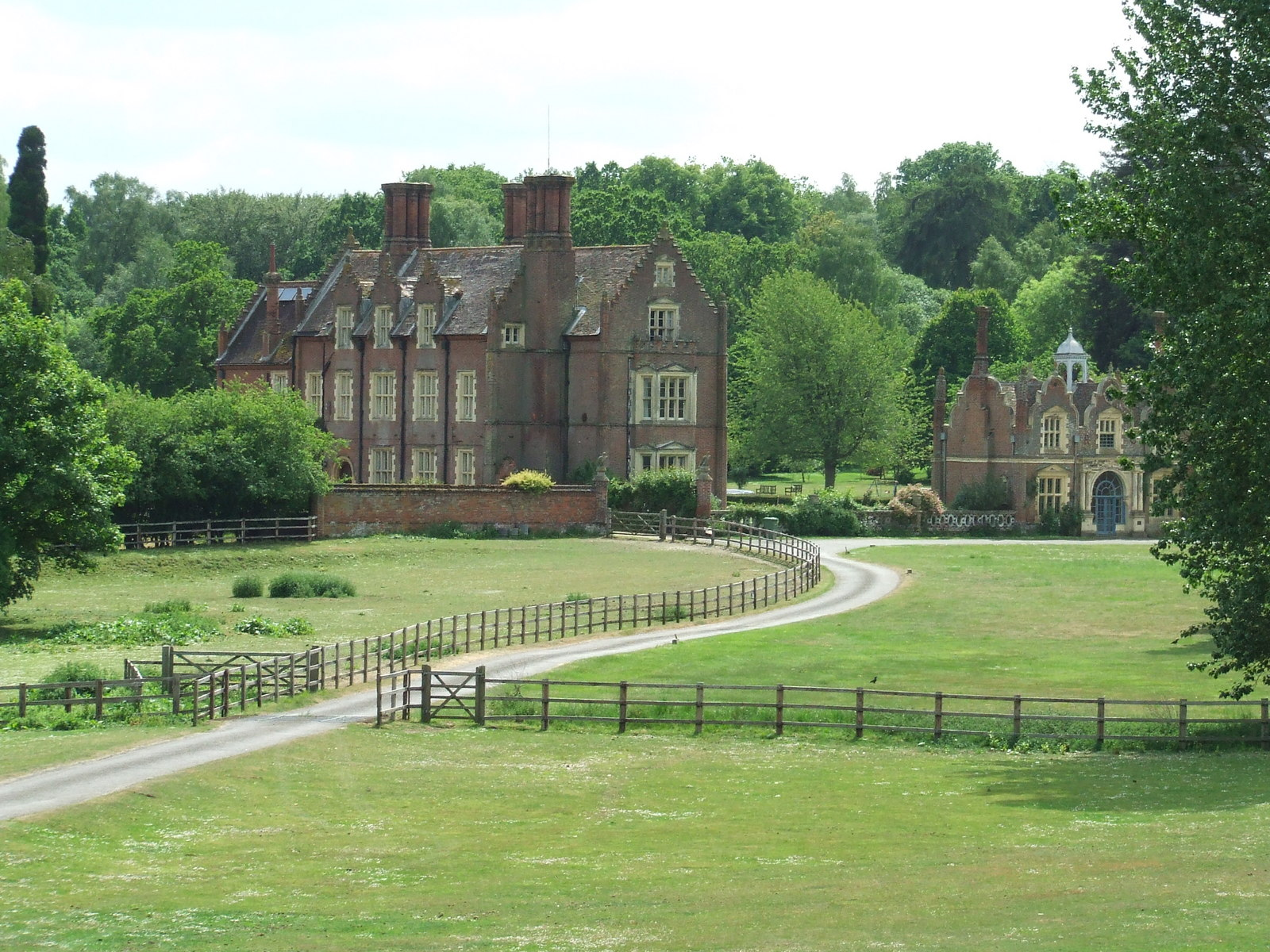
- Merton Hall with Gatehouse to right
- Interactive map of the Merton Hall, Norfolk area

General information
- Type: Country House
- Location: Merton, Breckland, Norwich, England
- Coordinates: 52.543957°N 0.817833°E
- Completed: 1846

Design and construction
- Designations: Grade II listed (north-west wing)

Merton Hall is a 19th century country house in Merton, Norfolk, England. The extant north-west wing is a Grade II listed building. The 17th-century gatehouse, the 19th century stables and other associated buildings are also listed. The house stands in a park about 2 miles in length.

== Hall ==
The current building, originally the north-west wing of a larger complex, was built in 1846 by architect Edward Blore. The remainder of the house, dating from 1613, was destroyed by fire in 1956.

It is built in red brick with stone dressings and plain tiled roofs. It comprises 2 storeys plus attic in the Jacobean style with a 5-bay frontage surmounted by 3 dormer windows.

== Gatehouse ==
The gatehouse was built in 1613 and now serves as the estate office. It is built in two storeys of brick with ashlar dressings and a plain tiled roof. A semi circular doorway is flanked by paired Tuscan columns. Other features include a clock in central gable head and a central timber cupola. It is a Grade II* listed building.

== Stables ==
Now used as flats and offices, the stables were built in 1898 by Milne and Hall of London. They are constructed in 2 and 3 storeys from brick with plain tiled roof. They are a Grade II listed building.

== Other features ==
Other listed 19th-century features of the estate include the shellhouse, a brick-built garden house by Edward Blore whose interior is faced entirely with seashells; the lodge, a one-storey building with a Greek-cross plan; and the brewery, now used as garages.

== History ==
Merton Hall was built in 1613 on the site of a house which had been in possession of the de Grey family since the middle of the 14th century, and prior to that of their ancestors in the female line, the Baynards, to whom the property was granted at the time of William the Conqueror. Some portion of the older buildings still remain. Additions were made to the house in 1846 and 1876, and extensive stabling and a coachman's house were erected in 1889 or 1890. The older part of the house was destroyed by the 1956 fire.

Members of the de Grey family who owned the estate included William de Grey (1652–1687), his son Thomas de Grey (1680–1765), and his son Thomas de Grey (1717-1781). All were local MPs for Thetford or for Norfolk. When the latter died childless the estate passed to his nephew Thomas de Grey, 2nd Baron Walsingham and thereafter descended in that family, via a succession of Barons Walsingham, to the present time.
