= William Parnell (cricketer) =

English cricketer and British Army officer

- Born: William Henry Parnell; 7 October 1837; Marylebone, London
- Died: 4 May 1879 (aged 41); St James's, London
- Military career
- Allegiance: United Kingdom
- Branch: British Army
- Service years: 1854–1879
- Rank: Lieutenant Colonel
- Cricket career

Cricket information
- Batting: Right-handed
- Bowling: Right-arm roundarm fast

Domestic team information
- Years: Team
- 1859–1870: Marylebone Cricket Club

Lieutenant Colonel William Henry Parnell (7 October 1837 – 4 May 1879) was a British Army officer with the Grenadier Guards and an amateur first-class cricketer who played for the Marylebone Cricket Club in the 1860s.

== Life and military career ==
William Henry Parnell was born on 7 October 1837 in Marylebone, London, the eldest son of Henry William Parnell, 3rd Baron Congleton and Sophia (née Bligh). After receiving his education at Rugby School, he joined the British Army at the age of 17, being granted the rank of ensign and lieutenant within the Grenadier Guards on 22 December 1854. Three years later, he purchased commission to lieutenant and captain, while in 1869, he further purchased commission to captain and lieutenant colonel. He died on 4 May 1879, a few hours after being taken ill at his Bury Street home in St James's, London. He was unmarried, and survived by two younger brothers, who were also in the army, Lieutenant Colonel Henry Parnell (later the 4th Baron Congleton) of the 2nd Battalion, and Major Arthur Parnell of the Royal Engineers.

== Cricket ==
Parnell made his first appearance in first-class cricket in 1859, playing for the Marylebone Cricket Club (MCC) against Cambridge University at Lord's. Parnell played as a lower-order batsman, scoring three runs. In all, Parnell played seventeen times in first-class cricket between 1859 and 1870, taking thirteen wickets with his fast roundarm bowling. Alongside the MCC, he also played once for I Zingari; all his first-class matches were played in the south-east of England.
