= John Loraine Baldwin =

English cricketer

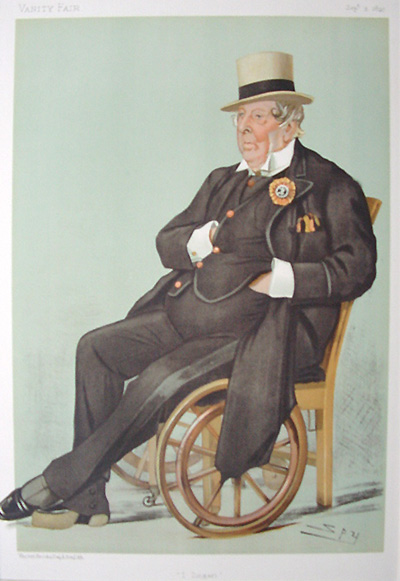
"I Zingari" Baldwin as caricatured by Spy (Leslie Ward) in Vanity Fair, September 1895

John Loraine Baldwin (1 June 1809 – 25 November 1896) was an English cricket enthusiast who was a co-founder of the I Zingari nomadic cricket club.

== Early life and education ==
He was born near Halifax, Yorkshire, only son- he had nine sisters- of Lieutenant-Colonel John Baldwin of the 9th Dragoons, and Eliza, daughter of Rev. Lambton Loraine, rector of Milton Keynes, Buckinghamshire, and Nailstone, Leicestershire by his wife Isabella, daughter of Sir Lancelot Allgood, of Nunwick Hall, Northumberland. Rev. Lambton Loraine was third son of Sir Charles Loraine, 3rd Baronet, of Kirk Harle, Northumberland, by Margaret, daughter of Ralph Lambton, of Lambton Hall, County Durham, of the family of the Earls of Durham.

Baldwin was educated at Westminster School and Christ Church, Oxford where he developed interests in cricket and dramatics.

== Career ==
He was a sports and games rules enthusiast, and one of the founders of I Zingari on 4 July 1845. He was also the writer of the first standardized rules for badminton in 1868, while on a visit to Badminton House, and editor of "The Laws of Short Whist" of 1864. He was Warden of Tintern Abbey in 1873.

In 1870, Baldwin "devoted his time to a careful study of the game of Bésique", producing a volume on its rules and "a system ... by which all players should regulate their game".

== Personal life ==
On 31 July 1873, Baldwin married Elizabeth, daughter of Rev. Algernon Peyton, rector of Doddington, Cambridgeshire, younger son of the politician Sir Henry Peyton, 1st Baronet and brother of the politician Sir Henry Peyton, 2nd Baronet. Elizabeth was widow of Royal Naval commander Lord Francis John Russell (1809–1861), son of John Russell, 6th Duke of Bedford, Lord Lieutenant of Ireland and half-brother of John Russell, 1st Earl Russell, Prime Minister of the United Kingdom from 1846 to 1852 and from 1865 to 1866.

Baldwin died at his home, St Anne's House in Tintern in 1896. A 'grand tomb' commemorates Baldwin in the churchyard of St Michaels, Tintern.
