= Matthew Woodford =

The Ven Matthew Woodford, MA (1738 – 1807) was Archdeacon of Winchester from 1795 until 1807.

Born to Mary nee Brideoake (sic.) and Mathew Woodford Esq. he was baptized on 22 July 1738 in Southampton and educated at Christ Church, Oxford, where he matriculated in 1755, graduating B.A. in 1759. A Chaplain to George III, he held livings at Tadmarton, Chilbolton and Upham.

Of his siblings: his brother Ralph was created in 1791 the 1st of the Woodford baronets; and his sister Anne married Peter Thellusson, a Caribbean merchant and financier.

Woodford died on 30 September 1807, and was buried in Winchester Cathedral and a mural tablet erected in the North Presbytery Aisle.

== Notes ==
Church of England titles
| Preceded by Thomas Balguy | Archdeacon of Winchester; 1795–1807 | Succeeded by Thomas de Grey |
