= Bath King of Arms =

Herald of the British order of chivalry, the Order of the Bath

- Heraldic tradition: Gallo-British
- Jurisdiction: United Kingdom
- Governing body: Order of the Bath

The King of Arms of the Order of the Bath, or Bath King of Arms, is the herald of the Order of the Bath. He is not a member of the Heralds College, but takes precedence next after the Garter King of Arms. He wears a crown.

== Kings of Arms ==
Name	Dates	Ref.
Grey Longueville	1725–1745	
Edward Younge	1745–?	
William Woodley	?–1757	
Samuel Horsey	1757–1771	
Sir Thomas Cullum, Bt.	1771–1800	
John Palmer Cullum	1800–1829	(son of Sir Thomas Cullum)
Ensign Algernon Greville	1829–1864	
Admiral The Hon. George Grey	1865–1891	
Admiral The Hon. Lord Frederic Kerr	1891–1896	
General Sir Lynedoch Gardiner, KCVO, CB	1896–1897	
Major General Sir John McNeill, VC, GCVO, KCB, KCMG	1898–1904	
Sir Spencer Ponsonby-Fane, GCB, ISO	1904–1915	
Admiral of the Fleet Sir George Callaghan, GCB, GCVO	1919–1920	
General Sir Charles Monro, Bt. GCB, GCSI, GCMG	1920–1929	
Admiral Sir William Pakenham, GCB, KCMG, KCVO	1930–1933	
General Sir Walter Braithwaite, GCB	1933–1946	
Admiral Sir Max Horton, GCB, DSO & Two Bars, SGM	1946–1951	
Air Chief Marshal Sir James Robb, GCB, KBE, DSO, DFC, AFC	1952–1965	
General Sir Richard Goodbody, GCB, KBE, DSO	1965–1976	
Admiral of the Fleet Sir Michael Pollock, GCB, LVO, DSC	1976–1985	
Air Chief Marshal Sir David Evans, GCB, CBE	1985–1999	
General Sir Brian Kenny, GCB, CBE	1999–2009	
Admiral of the Fleet The Rt. Hon. The Lord Boyce, KG, GCB, OBE, DL	2009–2018	
Air Chief Marshal Sir Stephen Dalton, GCB	2018–present	
