= Henry Langley (cricketer) =

English cricketer

Personal information
- Full name: Henry Fitzroy James Langley
- Born: 8 December 1846; Westminster, London
- Died: 20 December 1884 (aged 38); Buenos Aires, Argentina
- Batting: Unknown

Career statistics
Competition	First-class
Matches	2
Runs scored	4
Batting average	2.00
100s/50s	0/0
Top score	4
Catches/stumpings	1/0
- Source: ESPNcricinfo, 27 December 2014

Henry Fitzroy James Langley (8 December 1846 – 20 November 1884) was an English cricketer who played two first-class cricket matches during the 1866 Canterbury Cricket Week. In the first of the two matches, he appeared for I Zingari, a wandering amateur cricket club, playing as a specialist batsman, albeit low in the batting order. He scored four runs in the match, although he was not out without scoring in the second innings. In his following match, he batted as number eleven for the Marylebone Cricket Club, and made a duck in the first innings, before once again remaining not out without scoring in the second innings. He continued to play for I Zingari on a number of occasions between 1866 and 1878. He made his highest score for the club in an 1871 match against Huntingdonshire, when he remained 27 not out. He served in Her Majesty's Diplomatic Service. He died in Buenos Aires, Argentina on 20 November 1884.
