= Harry Leadbeater =

English cricketer

Harry Leadbeater (31 December 1863 – 9 October 1928) was an English amateur first-class cricketer, who played six matches for Yorkshire County Cricket Club between 1884 and 1890, all of them against the Marylebone Cricket Club (MCC). He also appeared in first-class cricket in matches for Gentlemen of England (1885), I Zingari (1886), an England Eleven (1886), and Lord Hawke's XI (1889). He played for Scarborough in 1892 in a minor match.

Born in Scarborough, Yorkshire, England, Leadbeater was a left-handed batsman, who scored 218 runs in all matches, with a best of 65 for Yorkshire against the MCC, at an average of 16.76. He took three wickets with his left arm medium pacers at 46.00, with a best return of 2 for 42 against M Sherwin's XI. He took eleven catches in the field.
