= De Gray =

De Gray or de Gray is a surname, and may refer to:

- Harry De Gray (1866–1952), American expatriate in Shanghai
- John de Gray (died 1214), English prelate, Bishop of Norwich
- Sidney De Gray (1866–1941), English actor
- Walter de Gray (died 1255), English prelate, Archbishop of York

== See also ==
- De Grey (surname)
