= George Callaghan =

Royal Navy Admiral of the Fleet (1852-1920)

Admiral of the Fleet Sir George Callaghan GCB GCVO
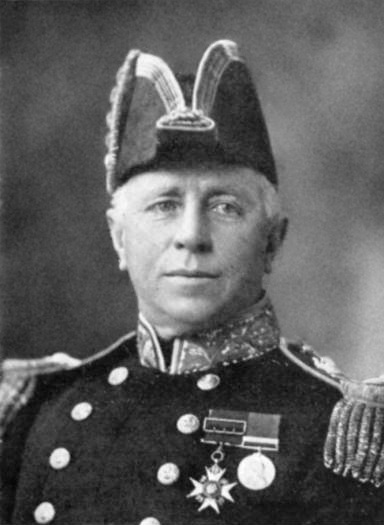
- Sir George Callaghan
- Born: 21 December 1852; London, England
- Died: 23 November 1920 (aged 67) Chelsea, London, England
- Buried: St Mary the Virgin, Bathwick, Somerset
- Allegiance: United Kingdom of Great Britain and Ireland
- Branch: Royal Navy
- Service years: 1866–1918
- Rank: Admiral of the Fleet
- Commands: HMS Alacrity; HMS Hermione; HMS Endymion; HMS Edgar; HMS Caesar; HMS Prince of Wales; 5th Cruiser Squadron; Home Fleet; Nore Command
- Conflicts: Boxer Rebellion; World War I
- Awards: Knight Grand Cross of the Order of the Bath; Knight Grand Cross of the Royal Victorian Order

Admiral of the Fleet Sir George Astley Callaghan GCB, GCVO (21 December 1852 – 23 November 1920) was an officer in the Royal Navy. During the Boxer Rebellion he served as commander of a naval brigade sent ashore to form an element of a larger expedition under Lieutenant-General Sir Alfred Gaselee: the expedition entered Peking and rescued the legations which had been held hostage there. He came to prominence again when, as Second-in-Command of the Mediterranean Fleet, he assisted with the provision of aid to survivors of the Messina earthquake, which had caused the loss of approximately 123,000 lives.

Callaghan became Commander-in-Chief of the Home Fleet in November 1911 and was advised in December 1913 that his tenure would be extended for another twelve months. With increasing international tension he started preparing his fleet for war. At the outbreak of the First World War in July 1914, Callaghan set sail in his flagship for his war station at Scapa Flow. There he met his successor-designate Sir John Jellicoe who had received orders from First Lord of the Admiralty Winston Churchill to relieve the ageing Callaghan of command of his fleet. Callaghan was bitterly disappointed not to command his fleet in the war he had completely readied it for. He went on to be Commander-in-Chief, The Nore.

== Naval career ==
=== Early career ===
Born the grandson of Daniel Callaghan MP, and the son of Captain Frederic Marcus Callaghan (an Irish landowner) and Georgina Frances Callaghan (née Hodgson), Callaghan joined the Royal Navy as a cadet in the training ship HMS Britannia in January 1866. Promoted to midshipman on 15 October 1867, he joined the screw frigate HMS Liffey at Liverpool later that month. He then transferred to the corvette HMS Wolverine on the East Indies Station in October 1870. Promoted to sub-lieutenant on 15 April 1872 and to lieutenant on 15 April 1875, he joined the corvette HMS Ruby on the East Indies Station in June 1877. In this post he was awarded a commendation by the Admiralty for saving the lives of sailors after a boat capsized in the Irrawaddy River.

He attended the gunnery school HMS Excellent in 1880 and then joined the staff there in 1882. He returned to HMS Ruby on the South East Coast of America Station in 1885 and, having been promoted to commander on 31 December 1887, he became executive officer in the battleship HMS Bellerophon, flagship of the North America and West Indies Station in 1888. He went on to be commanding officer of the despatch vessel HMS Alacrity, yacht of the Commander-in-Chief, China Station in 1892. Promoted to captain on 1 January 1894, he became naval advisor to the Inspector-General of Fortifications at the War Office later that year. He went on to be commanding officer of the cruiser HMS Hermione in the Channel Fleet in 1897 and commanding officer of the cruiser HMS Endymion on the China Station in 1899.

=== Boxer rebellion ===
In April 1900, Callaghan became commander of a naval brigade sent ashore to form an element of a larger expedition under Lieutenant-General Sir Alfred Gaselee as part of the British response to the Boxer Rebellion. The expedition entered Peking and successfully rescued the legations which had been held hostage there. Callaghan was mentioned in dispatches and appointed a Companion of the Order of the Bath on 9 November 1900.

=== Higher rank ===
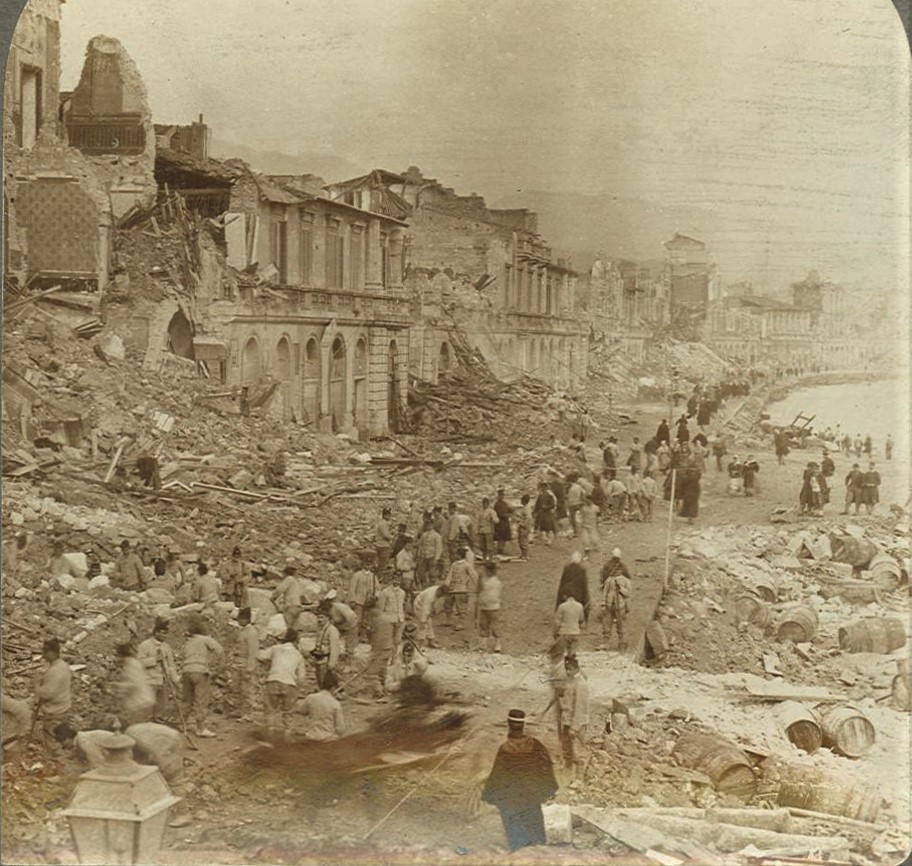
The carnage after the Messina earthquake; Callaghan assisted with the provision of aid to survivors

Callaghan became commanding officer of the cruiser HMS Edgar and commanded her in manoeuvres in Summer 1901 before becoming commanding officer of the battleship HMS Caesar on the Mediterranean Station in December 1901. He went on to be Captain of Portsmouth Dockyard early in 1904 and commanding officer of the battleship HMS Prince of Wales on the Mediterranean Station shortly thereafter. He was appointed naval aide-de-camp to the King on 25 April 1904. Promoted to rear-admiral on 1 July 1905, he became Second-in-Command, Channel Fleet, with his flag in the battleship HMS Illustrious, in 1906 and commander of the 5th Cruiser Squadron, with his flag in the armoured cruiser HMS Leviathan, in 1907. Appointed a Commander of the Royal Victorian Order on 3 August 1907, he went on to be Second-in-Command of the Mediterranean Fleet with his flag in the battleship HMS Duncan in 1908. In the latter role he assisted with the provision of aid to survivors of the Messina earthquake, which had caused the loss of circa 123,000 lives, in December 1908 for which he was advanced to Knight Commander of the Royal Victorian Order on 30 April 1909 and appointed a Grand Officer of the Order of the Crown of Italy on 15 April 1912. Promoted to vice-admiral on 27 April 1910, he became Second-in-Command of the Home Fleet, with his flag in the battleship HMS King Edward VII later that month. He was advanced to Knight Commander of the Order of the Bath on 24 June 1910.

Callaghan became Commander-in-Chief of the Home Fleet, with his flag in the battleship HMS Neptune and with the acting rank of admiral in November 1911. Following an inspection of his fleet by King George V he was advanced to Knight Grand Cross of the Royal Victorian Order on 11 May 1912 and, after a separate visit by the President Raymond Poincaré of France in 1913, he was also awarded the Grand Cordon of the French Legion of Honour. He was promoted to the substantive rank of full admiral on 17 May 1913 and was advised in December 1913 that his tenure would be extended for another twelve months. With increasing international tension he started preparing his fleet for war.

=== The First World War ===
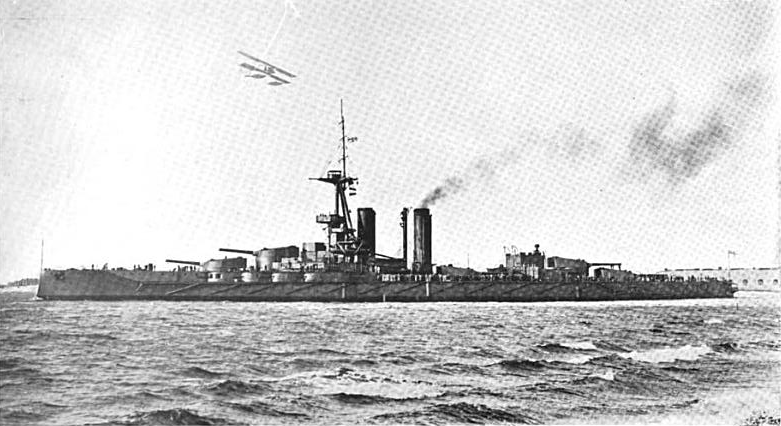
The battleship HMS Iron Duke, Callaghan's flagship as Commander-in-Chief of the Home Fleet

At the outbreak of the First World War in July 1914, Callaghan set sail in his flagship, the battleship HMS Iron Duke, for his war station at Scapa Flow. There he met his successor-designate Sir John Jellicoe, who had received orders from First Lord of the Admiralty Winston Churchill to relieve the ageing Callaghan of command of his fleet. Jellicoe had resisted the order, believing it would cause tension in the fleet, but the order was confirmed by the Admiralty and Jellicoe was instructed to carry it out. Callaghan was bitterly disappointed not to command his fleet in the war he had completely readied it for.

In Autumn 1914 Callaghan took part in a Court of Inquiry into the conduct of Rear Admiral Ernest Troubridge for his failure to pursue the battlecruiser SMS Goeben and the light cruiser SMS Breslau. He referred the matter to a court-martial which ultimately found the case against Troubridge not proven.

Callaghan was appointed First and Principal Naval Aide-de-Camp to the King on 11 September 1914 and became Commander-in-Chief, The Nore in January 1915. He was advanced to Knight Grand Cross of the Order of the Bath on 3 June 1916 and was promoted to Admiral of the Fleet on 2 April 1917.

=== Retirement and Later Life ===
Callaghan retired in March 1918 and became King of Arms of the Order of the Bath in May 1919. He died at 11 Cadogan Court, Chelsea, London on 23 November 1920 and was given a funeral at Westminster Abbey, following which he was buried in the churchyard of St Mary the Virgin at Bathwick, Somerset.

He was a member of the Bath and County Club.

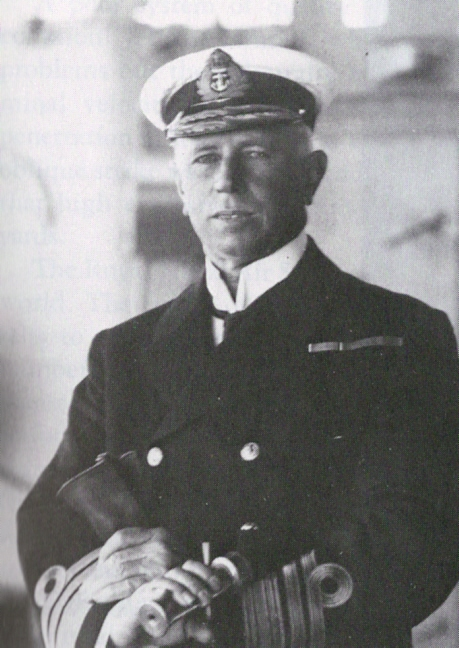
Sir George Callaghan as Second-in-Command of the Home Fleet

== Family ==
In 1876, Callaghan married Edith Saumarez; they had one son and three daughters.

== Sources ==
- Heathcote, Tony (2002). The British Admirals of the Fleet 1734 – 1995. Pen & Sword Ltd. ISBN 0-85052-835-6.

Military offices
Preceded by Sir Francis Bridgeman	Commander-in-Chief, Home Fleet; 1911–1914	Succeeded by none
Preceded by Sir Richard Poore	Commander-in-Chief, The Nore; 1915–1918	Succeeded by Sir Doveton Sturdee
Honorary titles
Preceded by Sir Edmund Poë	First and Principal Naval Aide-de-Camp; 1914–1917	Succeeded by Sir Henry Jackson
Heraldic offices
Preceded by Vacant; Title previously held by Sir Spencer Ponsonby-Fane	King of Arms of the Order of the Bath; 1919–1920	Succeeded by Sir Charles Monro
