= John McNeill (British Army officer) =

Recipient of the Victoria Cross

Major-General Sir John McNeill VC GCVO KCB KCMG
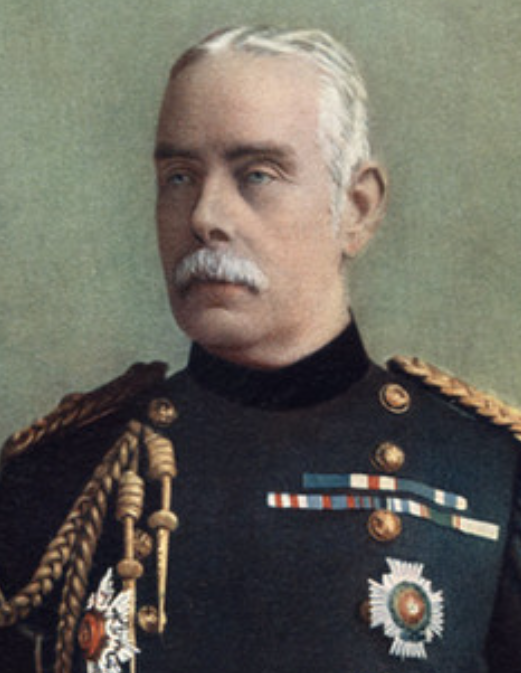
- Born: 28 March 1831; Colonsay, Argyllshire
- Died: 25 May 1904 (aged 73); St James's Palace, London
- Burial place: Oronsay Priory
- Relatives: Alexander McNeill (brother); Duncan McNeill, Lord Colonsay (uncle); Sir John McNeill (uncle)
- Military career
- Allegiance: United Kingdom
- Branch: Bengal Army; British Army
- Service years: 1850–1890
- Rank: Major-General
- Conflicts: Indian Mutiny; New Zealand Wars: Invasion of Waikato; Ashanti War; 1882 Anglo-Egyptian War; Suakin Expedition: Battle of Tofrek
- Awards: Victoria Cross; Knight Grand Cross of the Royal Victorian Order; Knight Commander of the Order of the Bath; Knight Commander of the Order of St Michael and St George
- Other work: Equerry to Queen Victoria

Major-General Sir John Carstairs McNeill, VC, GCVO, KCB, KCMG (or M'Neill; 28 March 1831 – 25 May 1904) was a senior British Army officer and Scottish recipient of the Victoria Cross (VC), the highest award for gallantry in the face of the enemy that can be awarded to British and Commonwealth forces.

== Life ==
McNeill was the son of Anne Elizabeth McNeill née Carstairs, and Alexander McNeill (1791–1850), brother of Duncan McNeill, Lord Colonsay and Sir John McNeill. His brother was Alexander McNeill. He was educated at the University of St Andrews and Addiscombe Military Seminary.

On 18 June 1850, he and Alexander survived the wreck of the Orion, in which their parents and two sisters lost their lives.

McNeill entered the Bengal Army in December 1850 as an Ensign in the 12th Bengal Native Infantry. During the Indian Mutiny, he served at the siege and capture of Lucknow, after which he gained the brevet of major. In 1861 he transferred to the 107th Regiment of Foot (Bengal Light Infantry) – later The Royal Sussex Regiment. Shortly afterwards he travelled to New Zealand as a staff officer, and was promoted brevet lieutenant-colonel in March 1864.

=== VC action ===
McNeill was 33 years old, and a lieutenant colonel in the 107th Regiment of Foot (Bengal Light Infantry), while serving as an Aide-de-Camp to Lieutenant General Sir Duncan Cameron during the Invasion of Waikato (a campaign of the New Zealand Wars), when the following deed took place for which he was awarded the VC.

For the valour and presence of mind which he displayed in New Zealand, on the 30th of March, 1864, which is thus described by Private Vosper, of the Colonial Defence Force.

Private Vosper states that he was sent on that day with Private Gibson, of the same Force, as an escort to Major (now Lieutenant- Colonel) McNeill, Aide-de-Camp to Lieutenant-General Sir Duncan Cameron. Lieutenant-Colonel McNeill was proceeding to Te Awamutu on duty at the time. On returning from that place, and about a mile on this side of Ohanpu, this Officer, having seen a body of the enemy in front, sent Private Gibson back to bring up Infantry from Ohanpu, and he and Private Vosper proceeded leisurely to the top of a rise to watch the enemy. Suddenly they were attacked by about 50 natives, who were concealed in the fern close at hand.

Their only chance of escape was by riding for their lives, and as they turned to gallop, Private Vosper's horse fell and threw him. The natives thereupon rushed forward to seize him, but Lieutenant-Colonel McNeill, on perceiving that Private Vosper was not following him, returned, caught his horse, and helped him to mount. The natives were firing sharply at them, and were so near that, according to Private Vosper's statement, it was only by galloping as hard as they could that they escaped. He says that he owes his life entirely to Lieutenant-Colonel McNeill's assistance, for he could not have caught his horse alone, and in a few minutes must have been killed.

=== Later career ===
From 1869 to 1872 McNeill was military secretary to Lord Lisgar, Governor General of Canada, and was on the staff of the 1870 Red River expedition under Sir Garnet Wolseley. He became a colonel in 1872 and served as Wolseley's chief of staff in the Second Ashanti War (1873–4), where he was wounded and invalided home. He was made a Companion of the Order of the Bath (CB) in March 1874, by which time he had also been appointed aide-de-camp to the commander-in-chief, the Duke of Cambridge. Establishing a close connection with the Royal Family, he was appointed equerry to Queen Victoria in November 1874, and accompanied the Queen's son, Prince Leopold, to Canada – becoming a Knight Commander of the Order of St Michael and St George (KCMG) in 1880.

He served in the 1882 Egyptian campaign, after which he was promoted to major-general, and made a Knight Commander of the Order of the Bath (KCB) in November 1882. Leading a brigade during the 1885 Suakin Expedition, he was in command at the Battle of Tofrek on 22 March, against Mahdist forces led by Osman Digna. The Mahdists attacked in force and, although they were finally driven off with heavy losses, McNeill was initially accused of being taken by surprise by the attack, while his superior, Lieutenant-General Sir Gerald Graham, was criticised for not giving him sufficient mounted troops. While Wolseley's report largely exonerated McNeill, this was his last command in the field. He retired from the army in 1890.

His association with the royal household continued, and he accompanied the Queen's son Prince Arthur on his world tour in 1890. In 1898 McNeill was appointed king of arms to the Order of the Bath and was made a Knight Grand Cross of the Royal Victorian Order (GCVO) in 1901, on the accession of Edward VII. He died, unmarried, on 25 May 1904 at St James's Palace, London, and was buried at Oronsay Priory, Argyll.

== Honours ==
British honours

- VC: Victoria Cross – 1864
- GCVO: Knight Grand Cross of the Royal Victorian Order
- KCB: Knight Commander of the Order of the Bath
- KCMG: Knight Commander of the Order of St Michael and St George

Foreign honours

- Ottoman Empire: 2nd class of the Order of the Medjidie (Ottoman Empire) – 1882.
- Kingdom of Prussia: Knight 1st class of the Order of the Crown – 1899 – in connection with the visit of Emperor Wilhelm II to the United Kingdom.

McNeill's medals, including his VC, are part of the Lord Ashcroft Gallery held at the Imperial War Museum, London.

Heraldic offices
Preceded by Sir Lynedoch Gardiner	King of Arms of the Order of the Bath; 1898–1904	Succeeded by Sir Spencer Ponsonby-Fane
