= Edward Hadow =

English cricketer

Edward Maitland Hadow (13 March 1863 – 20 February 1895) was an English first-class cricketer active 1883–93 who played for Middlesex and Marylebone Cricket Club. He was born in Sudbury Priory; died in Cannes.

He was educated at Harrow School for whom he would play cricket.
