= Walter Forbes (cricketer) =

English cricketer

Personal information
- Full name: Walter Francis Forbes
- Born: 20 January 1858; Malvern Link, Worcestershire, England
- Died: 29 March 1933 (aged 75); Marylebone, London, England
- Height: 6 ft 1 in (1.85 m)
- Batting: Right-handed
- Bowling: Right-arm roundarm fast
- Relatives: Beilby Lawley (father-in-law)

Career statistics
Competition	First-class
Matches	11
Runs scored	382
Batting average	21.22
100s/50s	–/3
Top score	80
Balls bowled	1,935
Wickets	31
Bowling average	21.90
5 wickets in innings	2
10 wickets in match	–
Best bowling	6/32
Catches/stumpings	6/–
- Source: Cricinfo, 9 August 2019

Walter Francis Forbes (20 January 1858 – 29 March 1933) was an English first-class cricketer.

Forbes was born at Malvern Link in January 1858. He attended Eton College, where he developed a reputation as a good schoolboy cricketer, playing alongside the likes of Alfred and Edward Lyttelton, Ivo Bligh and A. J. Webbe. Unlike his contemporaries, he played little first-class cricket after leaving Eton. His first-class debut came for the Gentlemen of England against Cambridge University at Fenner's in 1877. He played two first-class matches during the 1878 Scarborough Festival, playing for I Zingari against Yorkshire and for the Gentlemen of England against the touring Australians. His association with the Scarborough Festival continued for several years, with Forbes making two appearances in 1879 (including playing for the Gentlemen of the North against the Gentlemen of the South) and one appearance each in 1881 and 1882. He made three first-class appearances in 1883, playing once for the Gentlemen of England and appearing twice for the Gentlemen in the Gentlemen v Players fixtures at The Oval and Lord's. His final first-class appearance came in the 1884 Scarborough Festival for I Zingari against the touring Australians. Across eleven first-class matches, Forbes scored 382 runs at an average of 21.22 and a high score of 80. With his right-arm roundarm fast bowling, he took 31 wickets at a bowling average of 21.90, with best figures of 6 for 32. These figures, one of two five wicket hauls he took, came for I Zingari against the Australians in 1882.

Outside of cricket, he worked as steward for the Dukes of Richmond at Goodwood. He died at Marylebone in March 1933. His father-in-law, Beilby Lawley, also played first-class cricket.
