= Arnald de Grey =

English cricketer

Personal information
- Full name: Arnald de Grey
- Born: 11 September 1856; Westminster, London, England
- Died: 15 November 1889 (aged 33); Hyères, France
- Batting: Right-handed

Domestic team information
- Years: Team
- 1872–1880: I Zingari
- Only First-class: 2 September 1880 I Zingari v Yorkshire

Career statistics
Competition	First-class
Matches	1
Runs scored	1
Batting average	1.00
100s/50s	0/0
Top score	1
Balls bowled	64
Wickets	0
Bowling average	–
5 wickets in innings	0
10 wickets in match	0
Best bowling	0/32
Catches/stumpings	1/–
- Source: CricketArchive, 5 May 2011

Arnald de Grey (11 September 1856 – 15 November 1889) was an English first-class cricketer who played for the amateur side I Zingari in 1880.

== Life and career ==
Arnald de Gray was the second son of Thomas de Grey, 5th Baron Walsingham and his second wife, Emily Elizabeth Julia (née Thellusson).

His son, Nigel de Grey, was one of the codebreakers that worked on decrypting messages from the Enigma cipher machine.
