= George de Grey, 3rd Baron Walsingham =

British peer and Army officer

The Right Honourable Baron Walsingham
- Born: 11 June 1776
- Died: 26 April 1831 (aged 54); Harley Street, London
- Burial place: Merton, Norfolk
- Education: Eton College
- Military career
- Allegiance: United Kingdom
- Branch: British Army
- Service years: 1794–1831
- Rank: Lieutenant General
- Commands: Heavy Cavalry Brigade
- Conflicts: French Revolutionary War: Fourth Anglo-Mysore War; Battle of Mallavelly; Siege of Seringapatam; Napoleonic Wars: Peninsular War; Battle of Bussaco; Battle of Campo Maior; Battle of Los Santos; Battle of Albuera; Battle of Usagre
- Awards: Army Gold Medal with Albuera clasp
- Other work: Comptroller of the First Fruits

Lieutenant General George de Grey, 3rd Baron Walsingham (11 June 1776 – 26 April 1831) was a British peer and Army officer.

== Early life ==
George de Grey was born on 11 June 1776, the eldest son of Thomas de Grey, 2nd Baron Walsingham, and his wife Augusta Georgina Elizabeth Irby, who was the daughter of William Irby, 1st Baron Boston. He was educated at Eton College before joining the British Army in the early months of 1794 as a cornet in the 1st Dragoons.

== Military career ==
=== French Revolutionary War ===
De Grey purchased a lieutenantcy in the 1st Dragoons almost immediately after becoming a cornet, and then on 13 March of the same year he transferred to the newly formed 25th Light Dragoons as a captain. He continued his swift rise up the ranks by purchasing the rank of major in the 25th on 25 May 1795, still only eighteen years of age. In early 1796 de Grey's regiment was sent to serve in India, as part of which journey they witnessed the Capitulation of Saldanha Bay in August 1796 off Cape Colony. After arriving in India the regiment joined the Madras garrison in time to participate in the Fourth Anglo-Mysore War. As part of such de Grey fought at the Battle of Mallavelly and Siege of Seringapatam in 1799.

Towards the end of 1799 de Grey learned from England that he had been promoted to lieutenant colonel to command the 26th Light Dragoons on 3 May. He returned to England to join the regiment, but by the time he arrived his orders had been changed and he was instead given command of his old regiment, the 1st Dragoons, dated from 6 June. The regiment was garrisoned in Kent and de Grey stayed there with them for the following two years, until in 1803 he was appointed an assistant adjutant general for the Home District. He served in this position until 1805, at which point he re-joined the 1st Dragoons. The regiment began a tour of the British Isles, marching north to Scotland and then travelling across the Irish Sea to Ireland, arriving there in 1807. On 25 April 1808 de Grey was promoted to the rank of brevet colonel and made an aide de camp to King George III, while still holding command of the 1st Dragoons.

=== Napoleonic Wars ===
De Grey's regiment had been meant to travel to Portugal to fight in the army of Lieutenant General Sir John Moore towards the end of 1808, but Moore's death and the subsequent evacuation of his army at the Battle of Corunna meant the move was cancelled. He stayed in England until August of the following year when the regiment was again sent orders to join an army in Portugal, and they arrived there in September. The regiment spent the remainder of the year at Lisbon before moving to the Spanish border near Ciudad Rodrigo at the start of 1810. Having arrived there, de Grey left the regiment to instead command a brigade of heavy cavalry on 13 May. He fought in command of his brigade at the subsequent Battle of Bussaco on 27 September and then formed part of the rearguard of the army as it retreated to the Lines of Torres Vedras for the winter. The Lines stopped the advance of the French towards Lisbon and when they began their retreat in November of the same year de Grey's brigade was part of the force that pursued the French, doing so until the enemy forces entered Spain in early 1811.

With the threat of an attack by the French now lessening, de Grey's brigade was sent to join Marshal William Beresford's force marching to fight at the Siege of Badajoz. After this open battle with the French began again, and de Grey's brigade was often involved. They were in reserve at the Battle of Campo Maior on 25 March but saw heavy combat at the subsequent battles of Los Santos and Albuera, on 16 April and 16 May respectively. Then at the Battle of Usagre on 25 May de Grey's force saw its greatest success, destroying a brigade of French dragoons in a fight that saw 250 Frenchmen killed to only 20 British soldiers. This was de Grey's last action as a colonel because on 4 June he was promoted to major general as part of a large group of promotions to that rank. With there being more major generals than there were commands for them in the Peninsular War, some were not able to continue in their commands but Lieutenant Colonel Henry Torrens organised for de Grey to stay in his role and this was announced on 26 June. At this time the army was reorganised and de Grey and his brigade were sent to join the 2nd Cavalry Division. In August they traveled back to Ciudad Rodrigo where they spent the remainder of 1811, while moving to the 1st Cavalry Division in October.

In the middle of 1811 de Grey injured his shoulder and requested to Lord Wellington, the commander of the army, that he be allowed to return home to recuperate. At some point after his brigade had moved to Ciudad Rodrigo de Grey was given permission to leave his command, and by the end of the year he had done so, although the exact date of his departure is unknown. It has been suggested that this harmed his relationship with Wellington because at this time a large number of officers were attempting to be sent home from Spain and Portugal for reasons Wellington thought to be unprofessional. De Grey never received another active military command during or after the Napoleonic Wars, instead serving on the Home Staff of the Kent District until 1814, which was his last military appointment.

De Grey inherited the title of Baron Walsingham from his father when the latter died on 16 January 1818, also becoming Comptroller of the First Fruits at the same time. By seniority he was promoted to lieutenant general on 19 July 1821 but did not receive any further rewards for his service apart from the Army Gold Medal with Albuera clasp. de Grey has been described as one of the forgotten generals of the Peninsular War, doing nothing bad but equally not having any great successes, resulting in him often being left out of the narrative of the cavalry's role in the war.

== Family and death ==
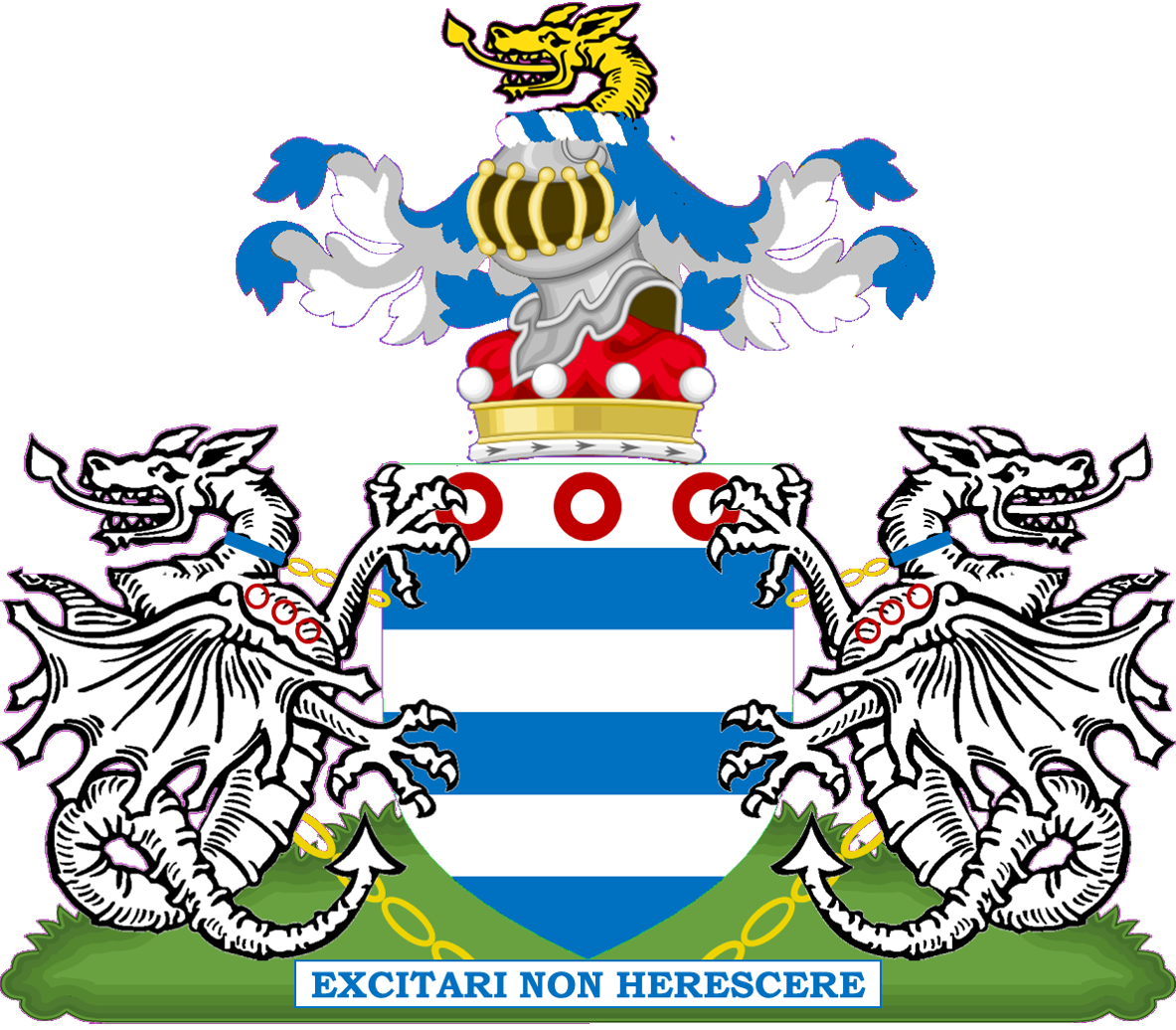
Arms of Grey, Barons Walsingham: Barry of six argent and azure, in chief three annulets gules; crest: A wyvern's head or; supporters: Two wyverns regardant argent collard azure chained or and charged on the breast with three annulets gules; motto: Excitari Non Herescere ("to be spirited not inactive")

de Grey married Matilda Methuen, the daughter of Paul Cobb Methuen, on 16 May 1804. They had no children. The couple lived in London at their home in Harley Street. On 26 April 1831 de Grey and his wife were sleeping there when his bed caught on fire; de Grey was unable to escape the incredibly intense fire and his corpse was found on the floor below, the fire having burned through the ceiling. His wife was not caught in the fire but jumped out of a window in order to escape it, breaking both of her thighs and dying shortly afterwards. The couple were buried at Merton, Norfolk and he was succeeded in his title by his brother, Thomas de Grey.

== Citations ==
Peerage of Great Britain
Preceded by Thomas de Grey	Baron Walsingham; 1818–1831	Succeeded by Thomas de Grey
