= William de Grey =

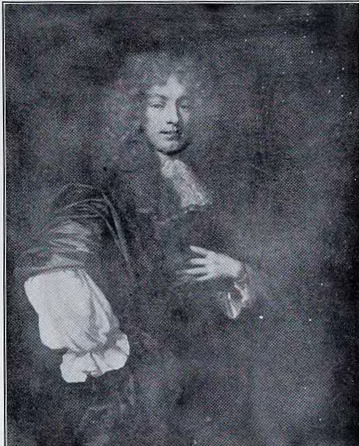
- Died: 1687
- Occupation: Politician
- Spouse(s): Elizabeth Bedingfeld
- Children: Thomas de Grey
- Parent(s): James de Grey; Elizabeth Stuteville

William de Grey (21 October 1652 – 27 February 1687) of Merton Hall, Norfolk was an East Anglian landowner and Tory Member of Parliament. He was the grandfather of his namesake William de Grey, 1st Baron Walsingham.

== Life ==
The descendant of Suffolk landowners who had acquired a seat at Merton, Norfolk by marriage in the 14th century, he was the only son of James de Grey (died 1665) and Elizabeth Stutevile, daughter of Sir Martin Stutevile of Dalham in Suffolk. James' father had been a Royalist in the Civil Wars, although James himself took part in the Eastern Association committee and local commissions under the Commonwealth and Protectorate and signed the Norfolk address to George Monck for a free parliament in 1660.

William was educated at Thetford before entering Caius College, Cambridge in 1668. He was admitted to Middle Temple in 1671 and four years later wrote a marriage settlement with Elizabeth Bedingfield, daughter of Thomas Bedingfield of Darsham. The couple had seven sons and one daughter, although five of the sons died before their father. The eldest of the two surviving sons, Thomas de Grey also became an MP. William initially became commissioner for assessment for Norfolk in 1673 and for Suffolk in 1679, holding both offices until 1680. In 1676 he also became deputy lieutenant for Norfolk and a year later a major in the foot militia, holding both offices until his death. In 1681 he was made a freeman of Thetford and in 1683 of Dunwich.

He followed up these offices with a political career, successfully contesting Thetford in 1685 and proving quite active during James II's parliament. He took part in committees considering bills on repairing Great Yarmouth pier, relieving imprisoned debtors, improving tillage and increasing the then-low prices on corn and wool, which were major local issue in East Anglia. He attended the Parliament's second session, although it is not known whether or not he favoured James II's policy of religious toleration. He died in 1687 and was buried at Merton.

Parliament of England
Preceded by William Harbord; Sir Joseph Williamson	Member of Parliament for Thetford; 1685-1687; With: Henry Heveningham	Succeeded by Sir Henry Hobart; William Harbord
