= Baron Walsingham =

Barony in the Peerage of Great Britain

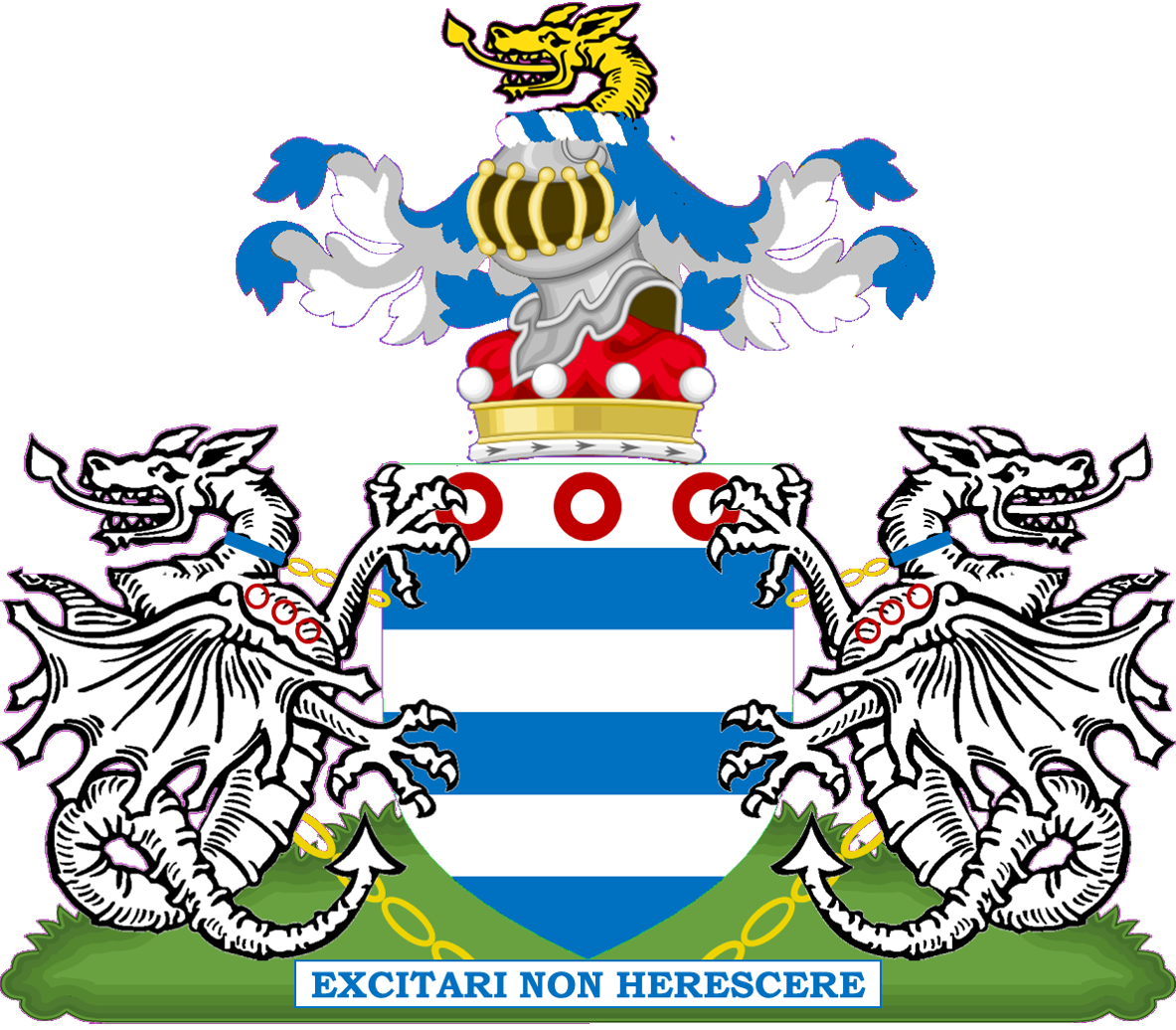
Arms of Grey, Barons Walsingham: Barry of six argent and azure, in chief three annulets gules; crest: A wyvern's head or; supporters: Two wyverns regardant argent collard azure chained or and charged on the breast with three annulets gules; motto: Excitari Non Herescere ("to be spirited not inactive")

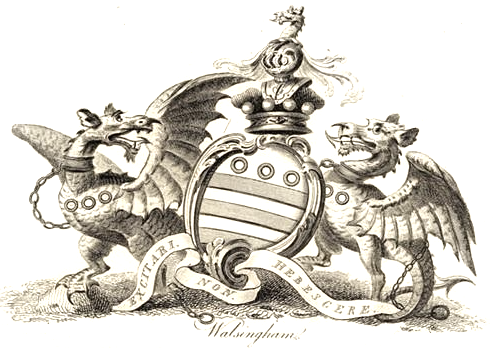
Arms of Grey, Barons Walsingham

Baron Walsingham, of Walsingham in the County of Norfolk, is a title in the Peerage of Great Britain.

This noble title was created in 1780 for Sir William de Grey on his retirement as Lord Chief Justice, who had previously served as Solicitor-General and as Attorney-General. His son, the second Baron, represented Wareham, Tamworth and Lostwithiel in the House of Commons and served as Joint Postmaster-General from 1787 to 1794; Lord Walsingham was also Chairman of Committees in the House of Lords for many years. His eldest son, the third Baron, was a Lieutenant-General in the Army, who was succeeded by his younger brother, the Archdeacon of Surrey, as fourth Baron. His grandson, the sixth Baron, was a Conservative Member of Parliament for Norfolk West and served as a Government Whip from 1874 to 1875 in Benjamin Disraeli's second administration. On his death the title passed to his half-brother, the seventh Baron, a barrister.

In 1929, his son Lieutenant-Colonel George de Grey succeeded as eighth Baron; he was appointed DSO, OBE and OStJ. His only son, Captain John de Grey MC, succeeded as the ninth and present Baron in 1965.

== Ancestors ==
- William de Grey (d. 1687), Member of Parliament for Thetford 1685
- Thomas de Grey (1680–1765), Member of Parliament for Norfolk 1715–1727
- Thomas de Grey (1717–1781), Member of Parliament for Norfolk 1764–1774;

== Barons Walsingham (1780) ==
- William de Grey, 1st Baron Walsingham (1719–1781)
- Thomas de Grey, 2nd Baron Walsingham (1748–1818)
- George de Grey, 3rd Baron Walsingham (1776–1831)
- Thomas de Grey, 4th Baron Walsingham (1778–1839)
- Thomas de Grey, 5th Baron Walsingham (1804–1870)
- Thomas de Grey, 6th Baron Walsingham (1843–1919)
- John Augustus de Grey, 7th Baron Walsingham (1849–1929)
- George de Grey, 8th Baron Walsingham (1884–1965)
- John de Grey, 9th Baron Walsingham (born 1925)

The heir apparent is the present holder's son Hon. Robert de Grey (born 1969)
The heir apparent's heir apparent is his son Thomas de Grey (born 1997)

== See also ==
- House of Grey
- Sir Roger de Grey

== Bibliography ==
- Cokayne, George E.; Gibbs, Vicary; Doubleday, Harry A. (1949). The Complete Peerage of Great Britain of Ireland. Vol. XIV vols. London: St Catherine's Press.
- Kidd, Charles; Williamson, David (1990). Debrett's Peerage and Baronetage. London and New York: St Martin's Press.
- Mosley, Charles (1999). Burke's Peerage and Baronetage of Great Britain and Ireland. London: Genealogical Publishing Ltd.
