= Spencer Ponsonby-Fane =

English cricketer and civil servant

Sir Spencer Ponsonby-Fane
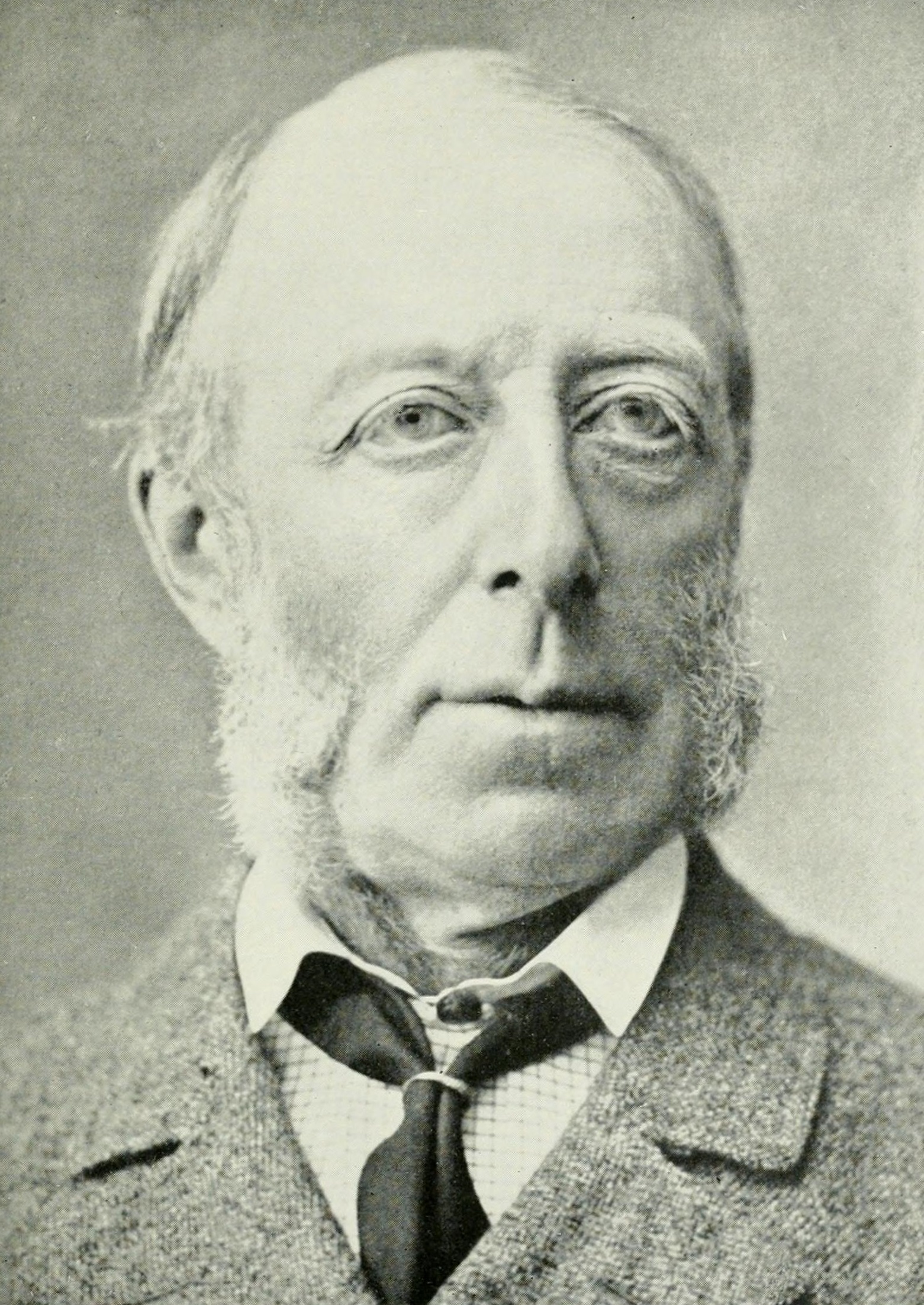

Personal information
- Full name: Spencer Cecil Brabazon Ponsonby
- Born: 14 March 1824; Mayfair, Westminster, London, England
- Died: 1 December 1915 (aged 91); Yeovil, Somerset, England
- Batting: Right-handed
- Relatives: Ponsonby family

Domestic team information
- Years: Team
- 1841–1862: Marylebone Cricket Club
- 1848–1858: Surrey
- 1862: Middlesex

Career statistics
Competition	First-class
Matches	62
Runs scored	1,359
Batting average	11.92
100s/50s	1/4
Top score	108
Balls bowled	184
Wickets	14
Bowling average	26.50
5 wickets in innings	1
10 wickets in match	0
Best bowling	5/?
Catches/stumpings	30/–
- Source: CricketArchive, 25 August 2009

Sir Spencer Cecil Brabazon Ponsonby-Fane, GCB, ISO (né Ponsonby; 14 March 1824 – 1 December 1915) was an English diplomat, civil servant, courtier, and cricketer.

== Life and career ==
He was born in 1824 in Mayfair, the sixth son of John Ponsonby, 4th Earl of Bessborough. Ponsonby joined the Foreign Office in 1840, aged 16. He was Private Secretary to three Foreign Secretaries: Lord Palmerston 1846–1851, Lord Granville 1851–1852, and Lord Clarendon 1853–1857. In 1856 he brought from Paris the definitive copy of the peace treaty for the Crimean War.

Later he was Comptroller of the Lord Chamberlain's Office from 1857 to 1901, Gentleman Usher to the Sword of State 1901 to 1915 and Bath King of Arms from 1904 to 1915.

== Cricket ==
Ponsonby played for both Middlesex and Surrey, and later administered Somerset and Harrow Cricket Club. He was a nephew of the Rev. Lord Frederick Beauclerk and had played with William Ward. As a 15-year-old boy, he played for the Marylebone Cricket Club in 1839. He later took part in the first Canterbury Cricket Week, and was one of the three founders of I Zingari in 1845. He was Treasurer of MCC from 1879 until his death in 1915, by which time he had been a member of the club for 75 years. He several times declined the offer of becoming president. While Treasurer, he began the MCC Collection, subsequently known as the Lord's Museum and Library.

== Family ==
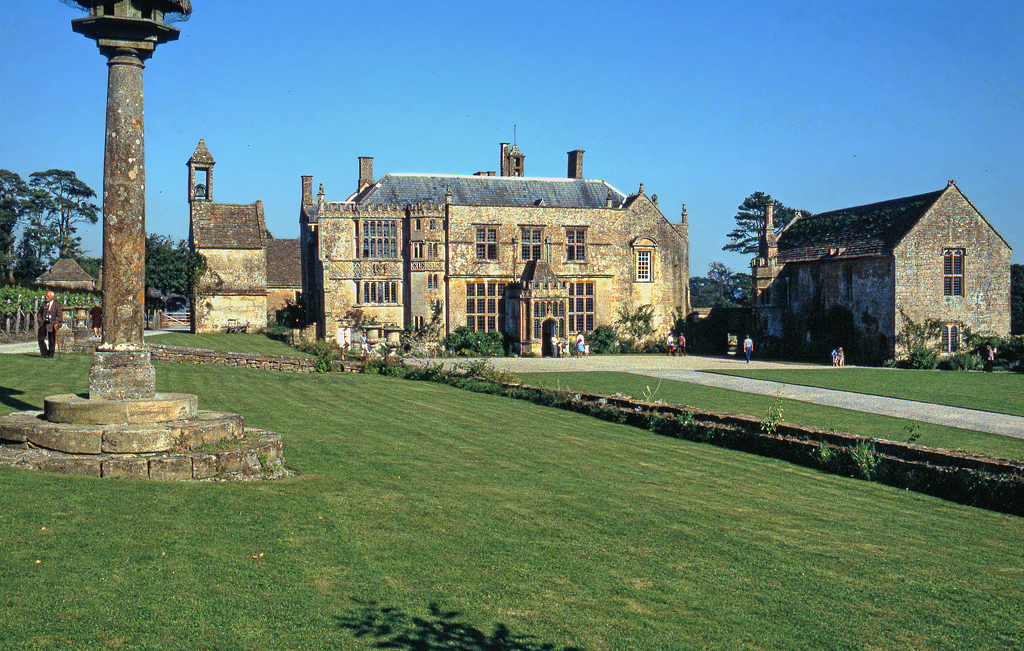
A view of the former Ponsonby-Fane family home, Brympton d'Evercy, in Somerset.

Ponsonby-Fane married, on 7 October 1847, the Honourable Louisa Anne Rose Lee Dillon (1825–1902), daughter of Henry Dillon, 13th Viscount Dillon. Lady Ponsonby-Fane died at their estate on 18 July 1902. They had eleven children:

- John Henry Ponsonby-Fane (22 August 1848 – 11 September 1916), married Florence Farquhar on 14 October 1875 and had issue; he later became a malacologist and a banker.
- Lt. George Richard Ponsonby, RA (25 April 1850 – 5 February 1871)
- Helen Emily Cristal Ponsonby (26 July 1851 – 17 January 1852), her second middle name having been given in memory of the Prince Consort's Crystal Palace at the Great Exhibition of 1851 (according to 27 August 1851 letter by Jemima, Lady St Germans – Helen had been baptized the day before, on 26 August 1851).
- Robert Charles Ponsonby-Fane (6 June 1854 – 16 November 1909), married Mary Maclachlan on 17 July 1877 and had issue.
- Constance Louisa Ponsonby-Fane (23 March 1856 – 4 May 1930), married William Robert Phelips on 1 January 1881 and had issue.
- Clementina Sarah Ponsonby-Fane (27 July 1859 – 15 September 1934), married Sir Edmund Turton, 1st Baronet, on 9 August 1888.
- Eleanor Hariett Ponsonby-Fane (26 December 1861 – 2 September 1878), drowned in a boating accident at Brympton d'Evercy.
- Sydney Alexander Ponsonby-Fane (26 February 1863 – 27 August 1940), married Audrey Catherine St Aubyn, daughter of John St Aubyn, 1st Baron St Levan, on 10 June 1893 and had issue.
- Hugh Spencer Ponsonby-Fane (5 December 1865 – 13 May 1934), married Anitha Magdalene Feuerheerd on 8 November 1894 and had issue.
- Margaret Maria Ponsonby-Fane (4 November 1867 – 14 December 1953), married Rev. Hon. Arnald de Grey, third son of Thomas de Grey, 5th Baron Walsingham, on 17 April 1882 and had issue.
- Theobald Brabazon Ponsonby-Fane (27 April 1868 – 14 May 1929), married Bertha Edwards on 10 August 1892.

In 1875, he changed his surname to Ponsonby-Fane upon inheriting the estate of Brympton d'Evercy from his aunt, Lady Georgiana Fane. He spent the remainder of his life there improving the gardens until he died in 1915, after which the estate passed to his eldest son, John.

Court offices
Vacant Title last held by Sir William Martins	Gentleman Usher to the Sword of State; 1901–1915	Vacant Title next held by Sir Edward Goschen
Heraldic offices
Preceded by Sir John McNeill	King of Arms of the Order of the Bath; 1904–1915	Vacant Title next held by Sir George Callaghan
