= Thomas de Grey, 2nd Baron Walsingham =

British politician (1748–1818)

The Right Honourable The Lord Walsingham PC
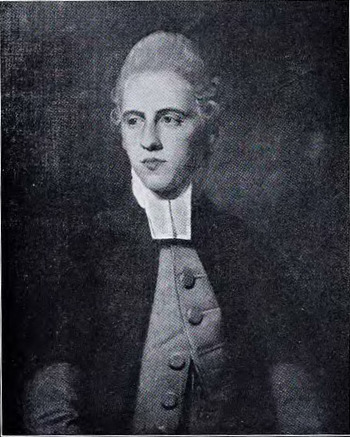

Joint Postmaster General
- In office 1787–1794 Serving with: The Lord Carteret 1787–1789; The Earl of Westmorland 1789–1790; The Earl of Chesterfield 1790–1794
- Monarch: George III
- Prime Minister: William Pitt the Younger
- Preceded by: The Lord Carteret; The Earl of Clarendon
- Succeeded by: The Earl of Chesterfield; The Earl of Leicester

Personal details
- Born: 14 July 1748
- Died: 16 January 1818 (aged 69)
- Spouse: Hon. Augusta Irby
- Children: At least 3, including George

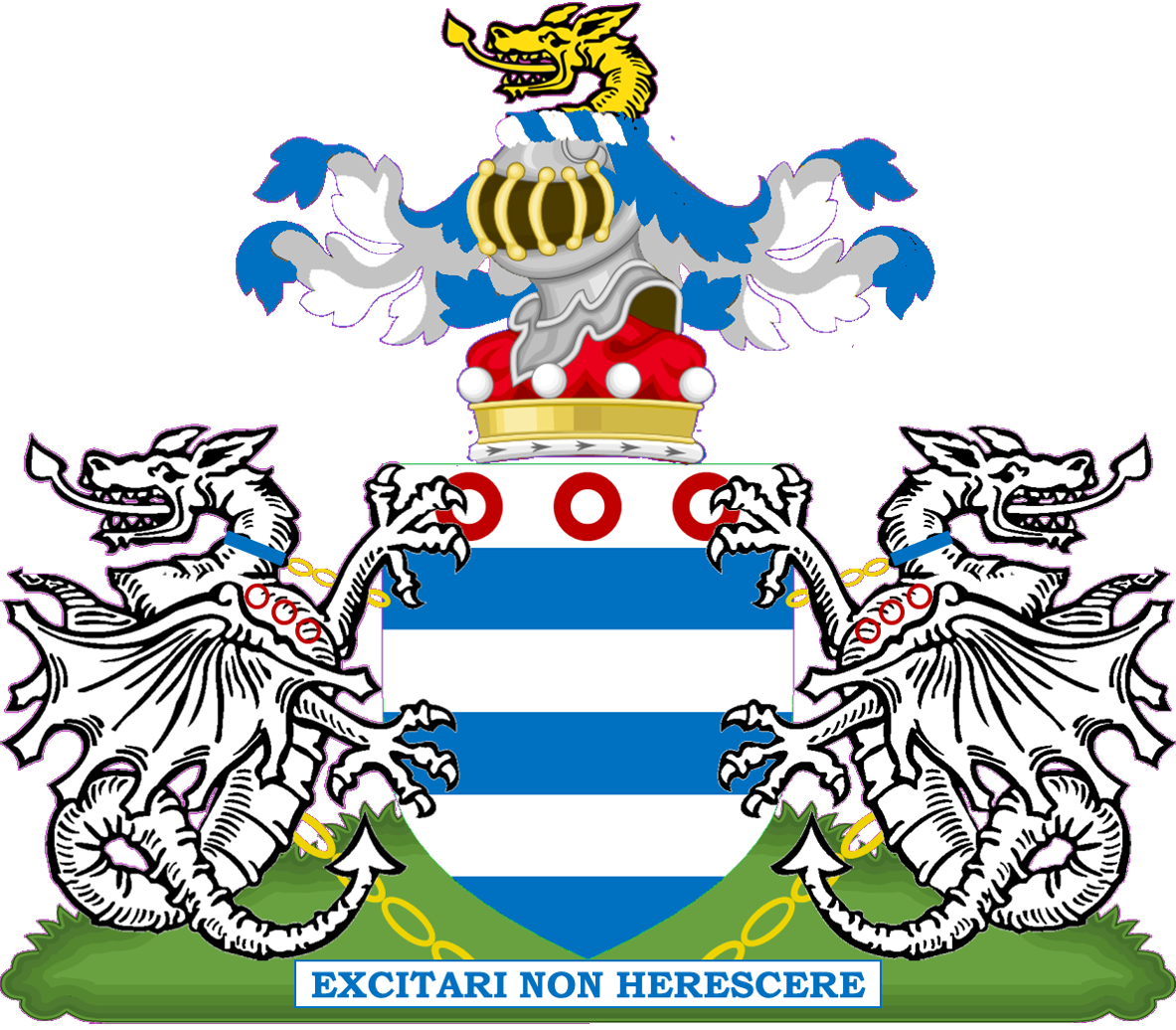
Arms of Grey, Barons Walsingham: Barry of six argent and azure, in chief three annulets gules; crest: A wyvern's head or; supporters: Two wyverns regardant argent collard azure chained or and charged on the breast with three annulets gules; motto: Excitari Non Herescere ("to be spirited not inactive")

Thomas de Grey, 2nd Baron Walsingham PC (14 July 1748 – 16 January 1818), was a British politician who sat in the House of Commons from 1774 to 1781 when he succeeded to the peerage as Baron Walsingham. He served as Joint Postmaster General and was for many years Chairman of Committees in the House of Lords.

== Biography ==
Walsingham was the son of William de Grey, 1st Baron Walsingham, Chief Justice of the Common Pleas, and educated at Eton College from 1760 to 1765 and was admitted at Trinity Hall, Cambridge in 1766. He succeeded his father as 2nd Baron Walsingham on 9 May 1781 and inherited his Merton Hall, Norfolk estate from his uncle Thomas de Grey the same year.

He served as Groom of the Bedchamber to King George III from 1771 to 1777. His other public posts included Lord of Trade (1777–1781), Under-Secretary of State for the American department (February 1778 – September 1780), Vice-Treasurer of Ireland (1784–1787) and joint Postmaster General (1787–1794).

== Political career ==
Walsingham sat as Member of Parliament for Wareham in 1774, for Tamworth from 1774 to 1780, and for Lostwithiel from 1780 to 1781, when he succeeded his father and took his seat in the House of Lords. In 1783 Lord Walsingham was admitted to the Privy Council, and from 1794 to 1814 was Chairman of Committees in the House of Lords.

== Family ==
Lord Walsingham married the Hon. Augusta Georgina Elizabeth Irby, daughter of William Irby, 1st Baron Boston. He died in January 1818, aged 69, and was succeeded in the barony by his eldest son, George.

Parliament of Great Britain
Preceded by Robert Palk; Whitshed Keene	Member of Parliament for Wareham; 1774; With: Robert Palk	Succeeded by William Gerard Hamilton; Christopher D'Oyly
Preceded by Edward Thurlow; Charles Vernon	Member of Parliament for Tamworth; 1774–1780; With: Edward Thurlow 1774–1778; Anthony Chamier 1778–1780	Succeeded by Anthony Chamier; John Courtenay
Preceded by Viscount Fairford; Thomas Potter	Member of Parliament for Lostwithiel; 1780–1781; With: John St John 1780; George Johnstone 1780–1781	Succeeded by George Johnstone; Viscount Malden
Political offices
Preceded by The Lord Carteret; The Earl of Clarendon	Joint Postmaster General; 1787–1794; With: The Lord Carteret 1787–1789; The Earl of Westmorland 1789–1790; The Earl of Chesterfield 1790–1794	Succeeded by The Earl of Chesterfield; The Earl of Leicester
Peerage of Great Britain
Preceded by William de Grey	Baron Walsingham; 1781–1818	Succeeded by George de Grey
