= Merton, Norfolk =

Civil parish in Norfolk, England

Coordinates: 52.554°N 0.8116°E

Merton
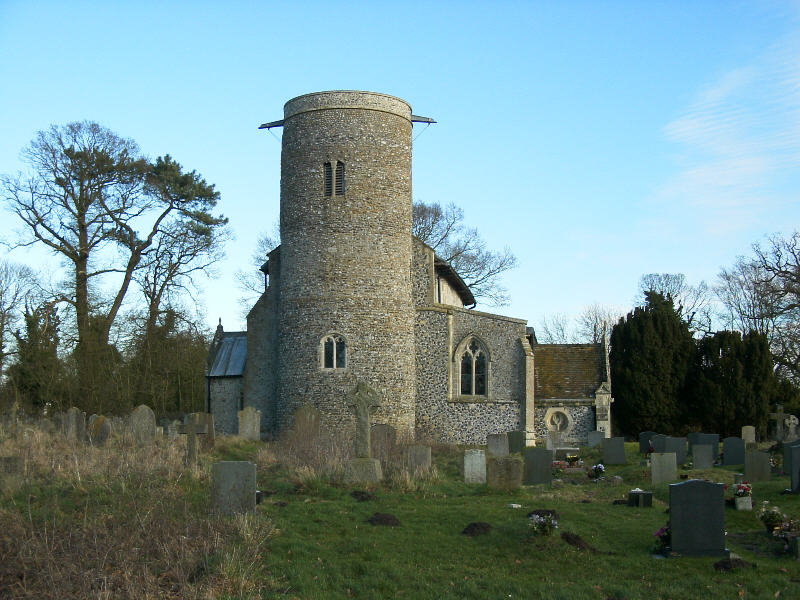
- Merton St Peter

- Location within Norfolk
- Area: 5.94 km^{2} (2.29 sq mi)
- Population: 133 (2011)
  - Density: 22/km^{2} (57/sq mi)
- OS grid reference: TL907988
- Civil parish: Merton
- District: Breckland
- Shire county: Norfolk
- Region: East
- Country: England
- Sovereign state: United Kingdom
- Post town: THETFORD
- Postcode district: IP25
- Dialling code: 01953
- Police: Norfolk
- Fire: Norfolk
- Ambulance: East of England

Merton is a civil parish in the English county of Norfolk. It covers an area of 5.94 km^{2} (2.29 sq mi) and had a population of 113 in 50 households at the 2001 census, increasing to a population of 133 in 56 households at the 2011 census. For the purposes of local government, it falls within the district of Breckland.

The villages name means "Pool farm/settlement".

Merton Hall is the home of Lord Walsingham.

Its church, St Peter's, is one of 124 existing round-tower churches in Norfolk and is a Grade I listed building.

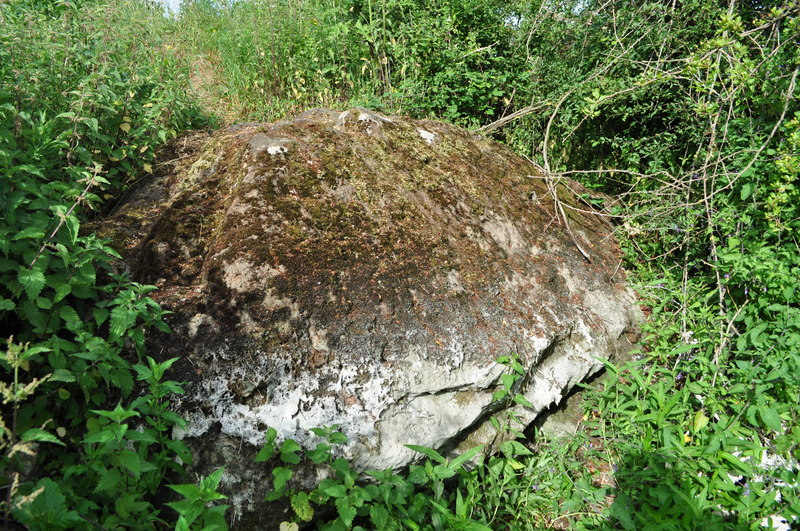
The Merton Stone, a glacial erratic
