= I Zingari =

Amateur cricket team

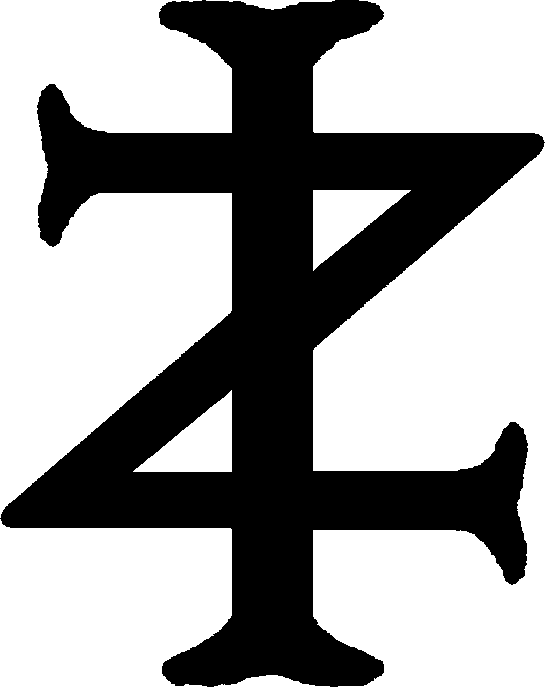
Established	1845
Founders	John Loraine Baldwin; Frederick Ponsonby; Spencer Ponsonby; Richard Penruddocke Long
First match	v Newport Pagnell; 29, 30 August 1845
First-class matches	17 (1866–1904)

I Zingari (from dialectalized Italian i zingari [i ˈd͡zin.ɡa.ri], meaning "The Gypsies"; corresponding to standard Italian gli zingari) are English and Australian amateur cricket clubs, founded in 1845 and 1888 respectively. It is the oldest and perhaps the most famous of the 'wandering' cricket clubs (without a home ground), and is well known for its historically aristocratic membership and its colours of black, red and gold, symbolising the motto "Out of darkness, through fire, into light".

== History ==
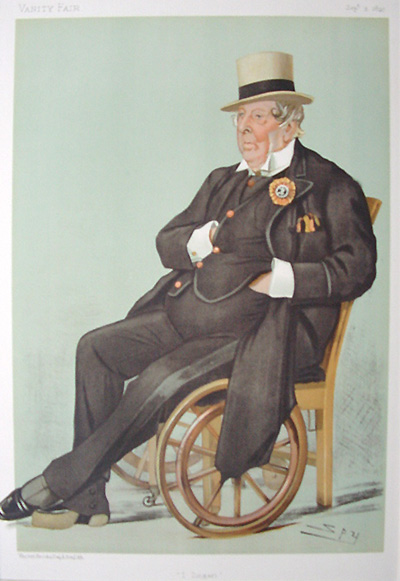
I Zingari co-founder John Loraine Baldwin as caricatured by Spy (Leslie Ward) in Vanity Fair

The English club was formed on 4 July 1845 by a group of Old Harrovians at a dinner party and thus is one of the oldest cricket clubs still in existence. The English team still plays around 20 matches each year. Also known as IZ, I Zingari is a wandering (or nomadic) club, having no home ground. Uniquely for an amateur club, Wisden reported all of its matches since 1867, but ceased to do so in 2005.

I Zingari was founded by John Loraine Baldwin, the Hon. Frederick Ponsonby (later 6th Earl of Bessborough), the Hon. Spencer Ponsonby (later Sir Spencer Ponsonby-Fane), Richard Penruddocke Long and Edward Dewing, who were dining at the Blenheim Hotel in London's Bond Street after a match against Harrow School. They decided to form a club to foster the spirit of amateur cricket, and the club rules are famously idiosyncratic. William Boland, a barrister, was appointed the Perpetual President, and remains in post after his death. As a result, the leader of the club is termed its "Governor". Recent Governors of I Zingari have included Charles Lyttelton, 10th Viscount Cobham (1956 to 1977), Alec Douglas-Home (1977 to 1989), George Mann (1989 to ?), Dennis Silk (? to 2015) and Mike Griffith (from 2015). Members included William Henry Goschen.

The club was at its strongest in the nineteenth century. It played seventeen first-class matches between 1849 and 1904, including matches against the Australians in 1882 and 1884.

== Colours ==
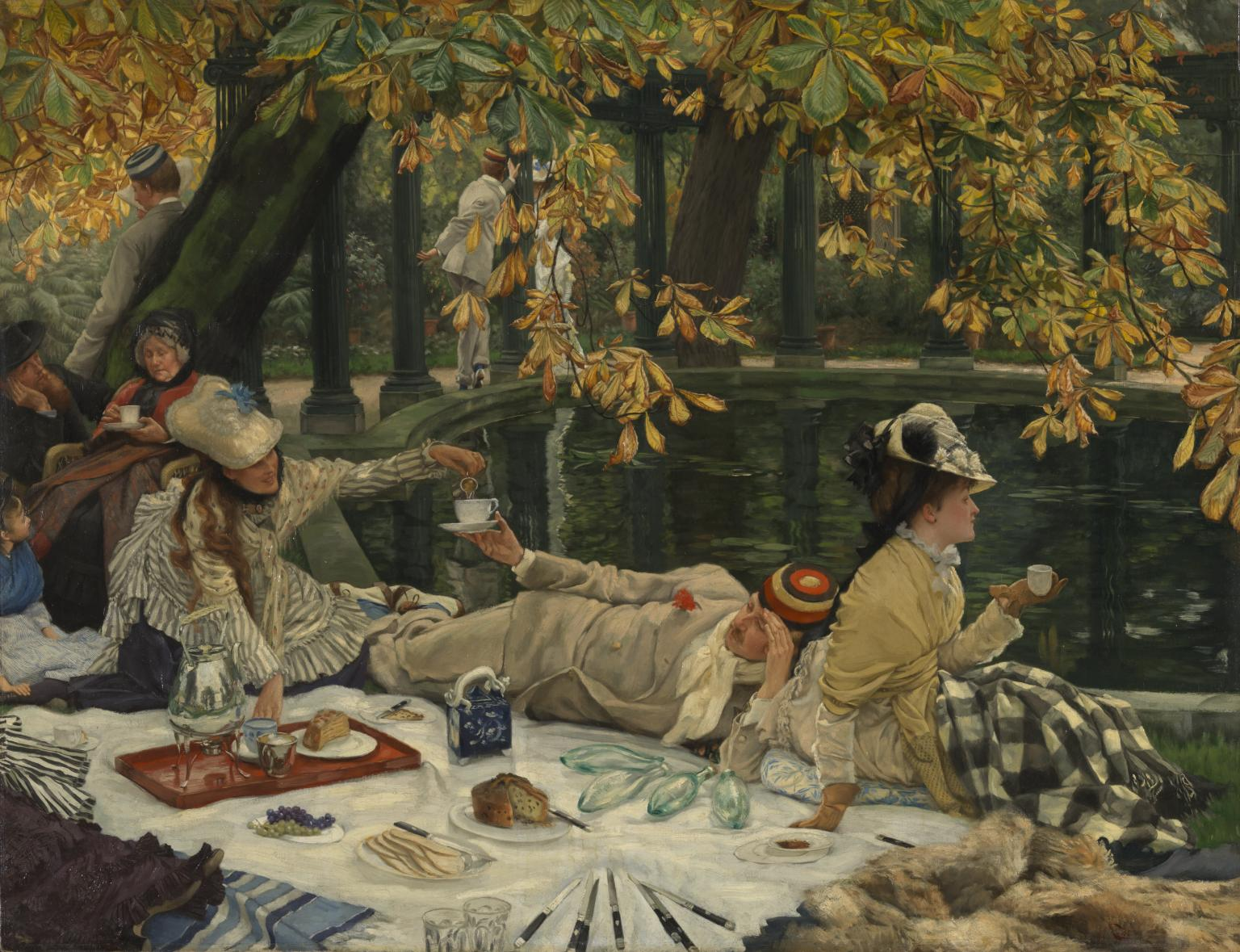
James Tissot's 1876 painting Holyday shows men wearing the caps of I Zingari.

Its club colours are black, red and gold, symbolizing the motto "out of darkness, through fire, into light". The colours inspired the egg-and-bacon colours adopted by the MCC in 1860, except on the tie the stripes go in the opposite direction.

== I Zingari Australia ==
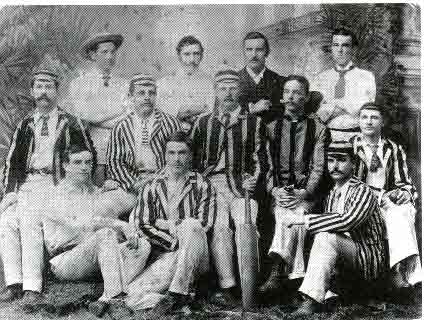
I Zingari Australia First XI 1889–90

The Australian club, I Zingari Australia, was formed in 1888, and claims to be the oldest social cricket club in Australia, although there are older school, university and district teams. It first played on 29 September 1888, defeating Newington College Past and Present by 37 runs. The Australian club was recognised by the English club in 1891 and given permission to wear the club colours. The Australian team still plays approximately 70 fixtures each year against other club, school and representative sides. Also in Australia, an I Zingari Rowing Club was established in Adelaide in 1882; it was renamed Adelaide Rowing Club shortly afterwards, but retains the same colours and motto as the English cricket club and the club's eight oared boats have all been named "I Zingari".

== Cultural references ==
The fictional "gentleman thief" A. J. Raffles, created by E. W. Hornung, plays for I Zingari.

James Joyce's 1922 novel Ulysses features real-life I Zingari players, and fictional protagonist Leopold Bloom at one time wears I Zingari colours.

Ambrose Abercrombie, the protagonist of Evelyn Waugh's 1948 novel The Loved One, belongs to I Zingari. Waugh based the character on I Zingari member and Hollywood actor C. Aubrey Smith.

In the 1924 novel by Michael Arlen The Green Hat the protagonist has a friend (Napier Harpenden) who wears ‘…his faded I Zingari tie…’

In the 1959 novel Love on a Branch Line by John Hadfield, Lionel Virley also wears a faded I Zingari blazer.

== See also ==
- List of cricket clubs in Australia
- List of I Zingari first-class cricketers
