= George Roberts =

George Roberts may refer to:

== Military ==
- George Arthur Roberts (1891–1970), Trinidadian soldier and fireman
- Philip Roberts (British Army officer) (George Philip Bradley Roberts, 1906–1997), British World War II general
- George R. Roberts (privateer) (1766–1861), Black American privateer
- George S. Roberts (1918–1984), U.S. Army Air Force officer and Tuskegee Airman
- George W. Roberts (1833–1862), American Union Army officer

== Politics ==
- George E. Roberts (1857–1948), director of the U.S. Mint
- George Roberts (Victorian politician) (1868–1925), Australian politician
- George Roberts (British politician) (1868–1928), British Labour MP, Minister of Labour
- George Roberts (Newfoundland politician) (c. 1845–1920), ship owner, newspaper owner, politician in Newfoundland
- George Roberts (Western Australian politician) (1913–1962), Australian politician and sports administrator
- Sir George Fossett Roberts (1870–1954), Welsh army officer and politician
- Sir George William Kelly Roberts (1906–1964), Bahamian politician
- George B. Roberts Jr. (born 1939), American politician

== Sports ==
- George Quinlan Roberts (1860–1943), Tasmanian-born rower
- George Roberts (rugby union) (1914–1943), Scottish player
- George Roberts (American football) (born 1955), American football player
- George Roberts (rower) (born 1980), Australian rower

== Other ==
- George Roberts (mariner), British sailor
- George Roberts (antiquary) (died 1860), English schoolmaster and Dorset local historian
- George Brooke Roberts (1833–1897), civil engineer
- George Roberts (aircraft engineer) (1909–2009), Australian aircraft engineer
- George Roberts (publisher) (1873–1953), Irish actor, poet and publisher
- George R. Roberts (born 1944), American financier with Kohlberg Kravis Roberts
- George Roberts (trombonist) (1928–2014), American trombonist
- George Roberts (priest), English priest
- George Roberts (1769–1853), Welsh settler
- George Edward Roberts (1831–1865), English geologist and author
- George Roberts (carpenter) (1826–1899), Canadian carpenter, joiner and businessman
- George Roberts, Barbie's father of the Barbie franchise
