= Jacob Bobart =

Jacob Bobart may refer to:

- Jacob Bobart the Elder (1599–1680), German botanist
- Jacob Bobart the Younger (1641–1719), English botanist, son of the above
