= Walter Dayrell =

- Born: 1610
- Died: 29 March 1684 (aged 73–74)

Walter Dayrell (17 February 1610 – 29 March 1684) was a canon and the archdeacon of Winchester from 1666 to 1684.

== Education ==
He was educated at John Roysse's Free School in Abingdon, (now Abingdon School). He later studied at Jesus College, Oxford and Christ Church, Oxford and gained a Doctor of Divinity.

== Career ==
He is listed as being a lawyer and an important citizen in Abingdon during the early seventeenth century and resided at Lacies Court (now in the grounds of Abingdon School).

He succeeded Thomas Gorges as the archdeacon of Winchester in 1666, a post he held until his death in 1684. He was the first regularly appointed Recorder of the Abingdon Borough and has his arms engraved at St Nicolas Church, Abingdon because he was a benefactor.

Church of England titles
Preceded by Thomas Gorges	Archdeacon of Winchester; 1666–1684	Succeeded by Robert Sharrock

== See also ==
- List of Old Abingdonians
