= Robert Sharrock =

English churchman and botanist

Robert Sharrock (1630–1684) was an English churchman and botanist. He is now known for The History of the Propagation and Improvement of Vegetables by the Concurrence of Art and Nature (1660), for philosophical work directed against Thomas Hobbes, and as an associate of Robert Boyle

He became Archdeacon of Winchester, in the final year of his life.

== Life ==
He was baptised at Drayton Parslow, Buckinghamshire, on 29 June 1630, the son of Robert Sharrock. His father was rector of Drayton Parslow from 1639 to 1642, and of Adstock, Buckinghamshire, from March 1640 till his death in September 1671; his wife's name was Judith.

The son Robert was admitted a scholar of Winchester School in 1643, and was elected Fellow of New College, Oxford, on 5 March 1649 by the parliamentary visitors. He matriculated on 16 November 1650, graduated B.C.L. on 12 October 1654, and D.C.L. on 24 May 1661. He was presented to the college rectory of Horwood Magna in Buckinghamshire on 29 June 1665, and was installed prebendary of Winchester on 13 September 1665. In 1668 he exchanged Horwood for the rectory of East Woodhay in Hampshire, which was nearer Winchester, succeeding his younger brother, Edmund (born 1635), fellow of New College 1658–70. He became rector of Bishop Waltham in Hampshire in 1669, and Archdeacon of Winchester on 18 April 1684 (installed 21 April).

He died on 11 July 1684. He married Frances, daughter of Edmund West, who survived him, and, dying on 29 January 1691–2, was buried on 31 January at Bishop Waltham. His son Robert (1680?–1708) bequeathed to the bishopric of Lincoln the advowson of the rectory of Adstock, which had been purchased by his grandfather.

== Works ==
Anthony Wood says of Sharrock that he was considered "learned in divinity, in the civil and common law, and very knowing in vegetables". Historic interest attaches to his History of the Propagation and Improvement of Vegetables, Oxford, 1660, 1666, 1672, his first published book, as the results of the researches of an early student of natural science, especially botany. It reappeared in London in 1694 with the title An Improvement to the Art of Gardening, or an exact History of Plants. He carried out experimental work, for example testing the opinion of Jacob Bobart the Elder that certain plant species spontaneously mutated. Chapter 5 of the book reports extensive studies on grafting; he carried out practical trials in the Oxford Physick Garden run by Bobart. Sharrock's interests extended to Equisetum, disregarded in his time.

He also supplied prefaces to three of the physical treatises of Robert Boyle: Some Considerations touching the Usefulness of Experimental Philosophy (1663); New Experiments Physico-Mechanical (1665); and A Defence of the Doctrine touching the Spring and Weight of the Air (1669). Sharrock edited New Experiments and translated it into Latin.

Sharrock's work on political philosophy, Ὑπόθεσις ἠθική, De Officiis secundum Naturae Jus, was directed against Hobbes's views of ethics and politics (Oxford, 1660; Gotha, 1667; Oxford, 1682). It was quoted as of authority by Richard Cumberland in his De Legibus Naturae, and by other philosophical writers. According to Jon Parkin, "The aim of De officiis was to prove against Hobbes a number of hypotheses on the existence of a hierarchy of duties annexed to natural law"; and the method was to "transpose" Hobbes into an Epicurean so as to use against him old arguments of Cicero. Sharrock in doing this was accepting of some of Hobbes's criticism of scholasticism, but also had to distinguish himself from the unacceptable Hobbes. These manoeuvres were a partial prototype for Cumberland's more famous work in the same direction. Hobbes also came in for attack in Sharrock's Judicia and De finibus virtutis, the latter quoting research of Thomas Willis on neurology.

Sharrock also published:

- Judicia (seu Legum Censurae) de variis Incontinentiae speciebus, Oxford, 1662; Tübingen, 1668.
- Provinciale vetus Provinciae Cantuariensis, Oxford, 1663, 1664, a collection of constitutions and statutes of the archbishops of Canterbury from 1222 to 1415, and of the cardinal legates Otho and Othobonus.
- De Finibus Virtutis Christianae, Oxford, 1673.
- Royal Table of the Laws of Humane Nature, London, 1682, a skeleton plan of his Ὑπόθεσις ἠθική).
