= Robert Eden =

Robert Eden may refer to:

- Sir Robert Eden, 1st Baronet, of Maryland (c. 1741–1784), governor of Maryland
- Robert Eden (bishop) (1804–1886), primus of Scotland and bishop of Moray, Ross and Caithness
- Robert Eden (priest) (1701–1759), English priest
- Robert Eden, 3rd Baron Auckland (1799–1870), bishop of Bath and Wells
- Robert Anthony Eden (1897–1977), British politician
- Robert Eden, the name of several Eden baronets

== See also ==
- Eden baronets
- Robert Eden Duncombe Shafto (1776–1848), British politician
- Bobbi Eden (born 1980), Dutch pornographic actress
