= William Legge, 2nd Earl of Dartmouth =

British statesman (1731–1801)

The Right Honourable The Earl of Dartmouth FRS PC
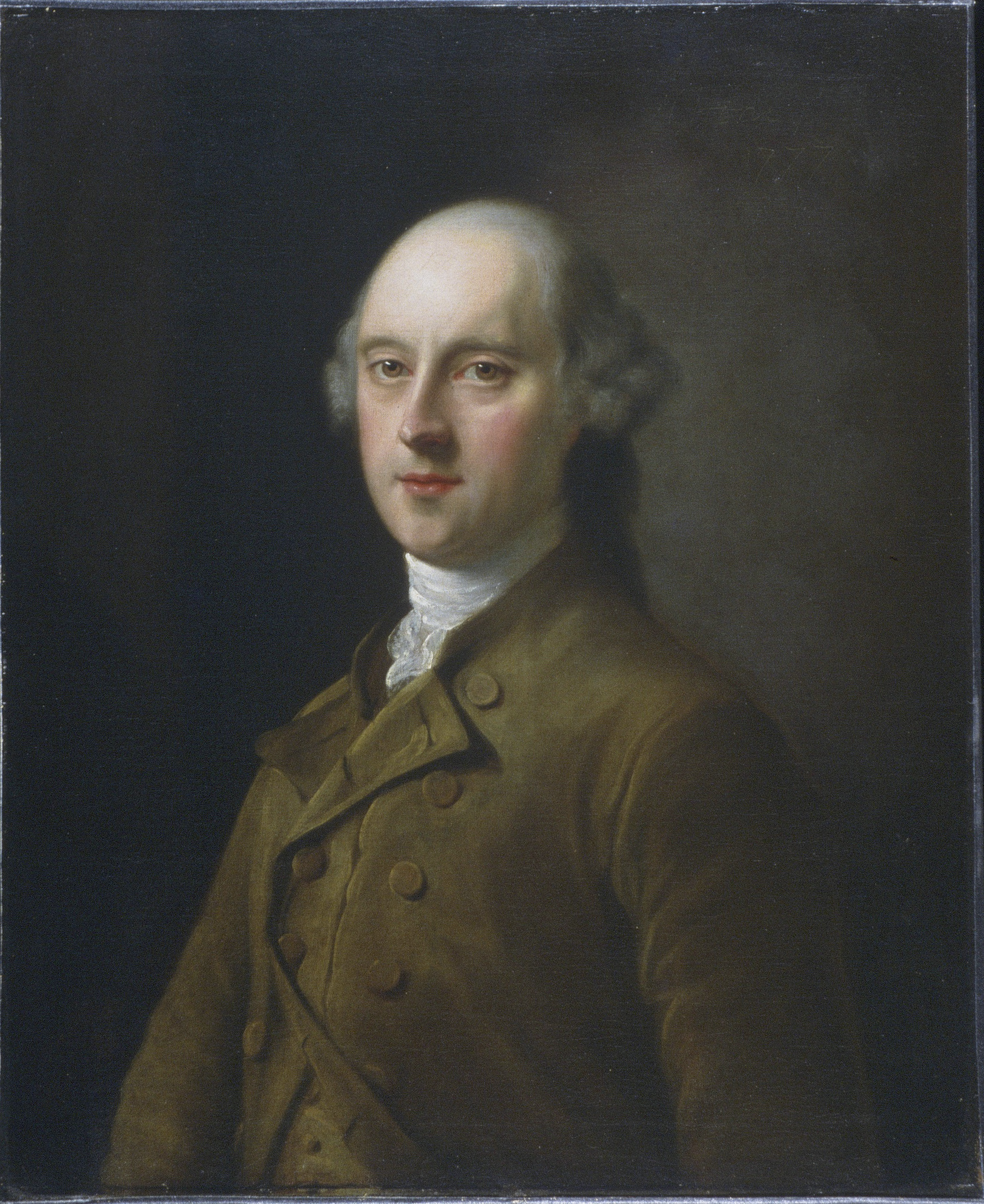

First Lord of Trade
- In office 20 July 1765 – 16 August 1766
- Monarch: George III
- Prime Minister: The Marquess of Rockingham
- Preceded by: The Earl of Hillsborough
- Succeeded by: The Earl of Hillsborough

Secretary of State for the Colonies and First Lord of Trade
- In office 27 August 1772 – 10 November 1775
- Monarch: George III
- Prime Minister: Lord North
- Preceded by: The Earl of Hillsborough
- Succeeded by: Lord George Germain

Personal details
- Born: 20 June 1731
- Died: 15 July 1801 (aged 70)
- Spouse: Frances Nicoll (d. 1805)
- Children: 9, including George, Arthur, Edward, and Augustus

William Legge, 2nd Earl of Dartmouth (20 June 1731 – 15 July 1801), styled as Viscount Lewisham from 1732 to 1750, was a British statesman who served as Secretary of State for the Colonies from 1772 to 1775, during the initial stages of the American Revolution. He is also the namesake of Dartmouth College.

== Early life ==
Dartmouth was the son of George Legge, Viscount Lewisham, who died when Dartmouth was one year old. His mother was Elizabeth, daughter of Sir Arthur Kaye, 3rd Baronet. He entered Trinity College, Oxford, in 1748, and succeeded his grandfather in the earldom in 1750.

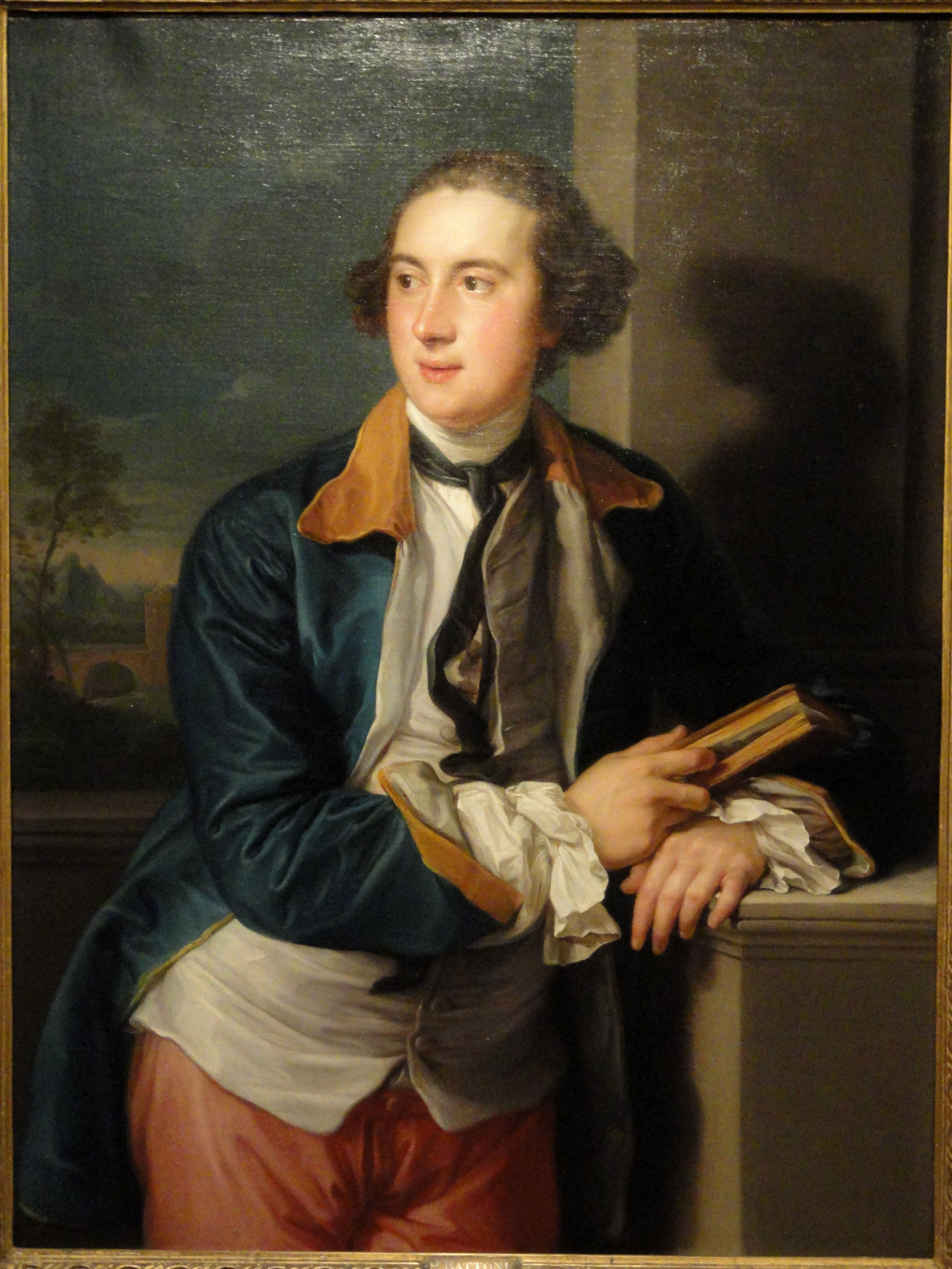
Portrait of William Legge, 2nd Earl of Dartmouth, by Pompeo Batoni, 1752–56, Hood Museum of Art, Dartmouth College, Hanover, New Hampshire

It was Lord Dartmouth who, in 1764, at the suggestion of Thomas Haweis, recommended John Newton, the former slave trader and author of "Amazing Grace", to Edmund Keene, the Bishop of Chester. He was instrumental in Newton's acceptance for the Anglican ministry.

== Political career ==
Lord Dartmouth's political career began with the presidency of the Board of Trade and Foreign Plantations from 1765-1766.

=== Secretary for the Colonies ===
Lord Dartmouth was Secretary of State for the Colonies from 1772 to 1775. He was in this role during the Boston Tea Party. He supported the Intolerable Acts and the Quebec Act.

In 1772, in correspondence with Sir William Johnson, the Superintendent of Northern Indian Affairs in America, he suggested that there was no reasonable way the British Government could support new trade regulations with the Indians. He sympathised with Johnson's arguments but stated the Colonies did not seem inclined to concur with any new regulations.

He received many letters from North Carolina royal governor Josiah Martin in the summer of 1775 communicating preparations the Loyalist government was making against Patriot militia units and events of the revolution.

He served as Lord Privy Seal from 1775-1782.

Lord Dartmouth's arrival in the Colonies was celebrated by Phillis Wheatley's famous poem, "To the Right Honourable William, Earl of Dartmouth."

== Philanthropy ==
Lord Dartmouth was a large donor to and the leading trustee for the English trust that would finance the establishment of the Moor's Charity School, in Lebanon, Connecticut, by Eleazar Wheelock to educate and convert the Indians. Legge was unusual as an aristocrat of this period by being a Methodist and attending the Wednesbury Methodist meetings, where fellow Methodists – many of them colliers and drovers – knew him as "Brother Earl".

Wheelock subsequently founded Dartmouth College in Hanover, New Hampshire, naming the school in Lord Dartmouth's honour, in hopes of getting his financial support. Lord Dartmouth refused. In London, Lord Dartmouth supported the new Foundling Hospital, a charitable institution for the care and maintenance of London's abandoned children. He served as a vice-president of the organisation from 1755 until his death. The famous painter Sir Joshua Reynolds painted the Earl's portrait and donated it to the hospital.

The portrait is still in the Foundling Hospital Collection and can be seen at the Foundling Museum in London. He was admitted a Fellow of the Royal Society on 7 November 1754.

== Marriage and children ==
Lord Dartmouth married Frances Catherine Nicholl, daughter of Sir Charles Gounter Nicoll, on 11 January 1755. They had nine children together:

- George Legge, 3rd Earl of Dartmouth (born 3 October 1755, died 10 November 1810)
- Hon William Legge (born 4 February 1757)
- Hon Charles Gounter Legge (born 18 May 1759)
- Hon Heneage Legge (born 7 May 1761)
- Hon Henry Legge (born 23 January 1765, died 19 April 1844)
- Admiral the Hon Sir Arthur Kaye Legge KCB (born 25 October 1766, died 12 May 1835)
- Rt Rev and Hon Edward Legge (11 December 1767 - 27 January 1827), Bishop of Oxford 1816–27
- The Ven and Hon Augustus George Legge (born 21 April 1773, died 1828), Archdeacon of Winchester 1814–19
- Lady Charlotte Legge (5 October 1774 - 5 November 1848), married Charles Duncombe, 1st Baron Feversham

== Death ==
Dartmouth died at Blackheath, Kent, on 15 July 1801, aged 70. He was buried in Trinity Church in the Minories on 3 August 1801.

He was succeeded by his eldest son, George. Lady Dartmouth died in July 1805. The family lived at Sandwell Hall (since demolished) in Sandwell Valley.

Political offices
Preceded by The Earl of Hillsborough	First Lord of Trade; 1765–1766	Succeeded by The Earl of Hillsborough
Preceded by The Earl of Hillsborough	Colonial Secretary; 1772–1775	Succeeded by Lord George Germain
Preceded by The Earl of Hillsborough	First Lord of Trade; 1772–1775	Succeeded by Lord George Germain
Preceded by The Duke of Grafton	Lord Privy Seal; 1775–1782	Succeeded by The Duke of Grafton
Preceded by The Duke of Rutland	Lord Steward; 1783	Succeeded by The Duke of Chandos
Peerage of Great Britain
Preceded by William Legge	Earl of Dartmouth; 1750–1801	Succeeded by George Legge
Preceded by William Legge	Baron Dartmouth (descended by acceleration); 1750–1801	Succeeded by George Legge
