= Stephen Cheston =

English lawyer and priest

Stephen Cheston (died 1572, by 1 February) was an English lawyer and priest. He was appointed Archdeacon of Winchester under Queen Mary I, and retained the position for the rest of his life, despite an attempt to remove him by legal means under Elizabeth I.

== Early life ==
Cheston was from Bury St Edmunds. He was awarded a Bachelor of Civil Law degree by the University of Cambridge, in 1542; by 1554 he also had a Bachelor of Laws degree.

== Associations ==
Cheston has tentatively been identified as the godson of Stephen Gardiner, bishop of Winchester, who in his will named a godson "Cheston of Burye". He is listed under "close relatives, household and servants" of Gardiner by Diarmaid MacCulloch, both at Cambridge and at Oxford.

In 1561 Cheston gave a copy of Cicero's works to Bury St Edmunds Grammar School. He would not have been a pupil there: this free grammar school was set up in 1550. It was, however, soon closely associated with Gardiner, and a recognised "conservative force" locally. Henry Harvey gave to the library there in 1560. The first head of the school was John King, who died in 1552. Cheston was a witness to King's will, and (unlike the first witness) was not noted as a priest.

== Archdeacon of Winchester ==
Gardiner, appointed bishop by Mary I, made Cheston Archdeacon of Winchester, collated on 12 March 1554. It followed the removal from the post of John Philpot (executed 1555), who by March 1554 had been excommunicated and was in the King's Bench Prison.

Cheston remained archdeacon, until his death on 1 February 1572. In 1564 Robert Horne as bishop of Winchester started proceedings against Cheston as archdeacon, on the grounds that his collation in 1554 was invalid in law. Horne did not have at this the full support of his diocesan staff for his strongly Protestant views, and nothing came of the case. Horne's chancellor George Acworth did limit Cheston's administrative powers to deal with wills of the clergy.
