= Harbidge =

Harbidge is a surname. Notable people with the surname include:

- Adrian Harbidge (born 1948), Anglican cleric
- Charles Harbidge (1891–1980), English footballer

== See also ==
- Harbridge (surname)
