= Fulgham =

Fulgham is a surname. Notable people with the surname include:

- Alonzo Fulgham, former Acting Administrator of the United States Agency for International Development (USAID)
- George T. Fulgham, Sheriff of San Bernardino County, California from 1864 to 1866
- John Fulgham (born 1956), American baseball player
- Travis Fulgham (born 1995), American football player

== See also ==
- Fulgham Ridge, a narrow ice-free ridge in the Queen Maud Mountains, Antarctica

== See also ==
- Fulham (disambiguation)
