= Gilbert Heathcote (priest) =

The Ven Gilbert Heathcote (5 February 1765 – 19 October 1829) was Archdeacon of Winchester from 1819 until his death.

The fifth son of Sir Thomas Heathcote, 2nd Baronet (of Hursley) by his second wife, Anne Tollett, he was educated at Winchester College and New College, Oxford. He held livings at Hursley and Andover; and was appointed Treasurer of Wells in 1814.

He died on 19 October 1829. Two of his sons, Gilbert Wall Heathcote and William Beadon Heathcote, became Anglican clergymen.

Church of England titles
Preceded by Augustus Legge	Archdeacon of Winchester; 1819–1829	Succeeded by Charles Hoare
