= Burby =

Burby is a surname. Notable people with the surname include:

- Cuthbert Burby (died 1607), English bookseller and publisher
- Edward Burby (died 1653), English priest
