= Rouch =

Rouch is a surname. Notable people with the surname include:

- Jean Rouch (1917–2004), French film director and anthropologist
- Mickaël Rouch (born 1993), French rugby player
- Peter Rouch (born 1966), British Anglican clergyman

== See also ==
- Rouch Point, a headland of Antarctica
