= Nicholas Lechmere (priest) =

English priest

Nicholas Lechmere (1700/1–1770) was an English priest in the 18th century. He was Archdeacon of Winchester briefly, in 1749–50.

== Life ==
He was the son of Richard Lechmere and matriculated at Wadham College, Oxford in 1719. He graduated B.A. in 1723, and M.A. in 1725 from Merton College. According to Hanley and the House of Lechmere, his father Richard was the son of Nicholas Lechmere, and resided at Sutton Hall in London. This Nicholas Lechmere was son of Thomas Lechmere, brother of Nicholas Lechmere (1613–1701) the judge, as recorded in a manuscript by the judge. The same source suggests that Major Richard Lechmere, of Newbourne Hall, who was involved in Whig politics around 1714, was from this branch of the family, being another son of Thomas. Five members of the Lechmere family were Members of Parliament in the 18th century.

In his early clerical career, Nicholas Lechmere was Rector of Warnford in Hampshire from 1733, jointly for two years with Easington, Oxfordshire. He retained the Warnford living for life.

Lechmere was made Archdeacon of Winchester in 1749. His appointment by Benjamin Hoadly was because of his family connection with the circle of Richard Steele, to which Hoadly had belonged. Nicholas Lechmere (1675–1727), son of Edmund Lechmere of Hanley Castle, had been one of the small group, with Hoadly and others, who had scrutinised Steele's 1713 Whig pamphlet The Crisis on the Hanoverian Succession before its publication.

In 1750 Lechmere resigned as Archdeacon, making way for Robert Lowth. Earlier in the year he was given the 9th prebend in Winchester Cathedral, which he retained. He died in 1770 and was buried in the north aisle of the nave of the cathedral.

== Family ==
Lechmere married in 1741 Mary van Ryssen.
