= John Ebden =

English priest

John Ebden (1516 - 1614) was an English priest.

Ebden was educated at Peterhouse, Cambridge, where he was a Fellow from 1547 until 1554. He was ordained a priest in 1560. He was Archdeacon of Durham from 1560 until 1563; and Archdeacon of Winchester from 1572 until his resignation in 1575.
