= Augustus Legge (archdeacon of Winchester) =

Augustus George Legge (21 August 1773 – 21 August 1828) was Archdeacon of Winchester from 1814 until 1819. The fifth son of William Legge, 2nd Earl of Dartmouth, he was educated at Christ Church, Oxford, matriculating in 1790 and graduating BA in 1794, and taking his MA at Merton College in 1796. A Chaplain to George III he held livings at Wonston, Crawley, Hampshire and North Waltham. In 1820 he declined an offer to be the Bishop of Killaloe.

Church of England titles
| Preceded by Thomas de Grey | Archdeacon of Winchester; 1814–1819 | Succeeded by Gilbert Heathcote |
