= Thomas Clutterbuck (priest) =

English priest

Thomas Clutterbuck, D.D. (died 1700) was an English priest in the 17th century.

Clutterbuck was born in Dinton, Buckinghamshire and educated at Magdalen College, Oxford, becoming Fellow in 1644. He held livings at Leckford, Llandrillo and Southampton. Clutterbuck was Archdeacon of Winchester from 1684 to 1700.
