= Fulham (disambiguation) =

Fulham is a district of London, England

Fulham can also refer to:

== Places ==
=== London, England, UK ===
- Fulham, an historic Inner London district
- Fulham District (Metropolis), a former local government district
- Fulham (London County Council constituency), a former constituency
- Fulham (UK Parliament constituency), a former parliamentary constituency
- Hammersmith and Fulham (constituency), a former parliamentary constituency
- Chelsea and Fulham (UK Parliament constituency), Greater London
- Metropolitan Borough of Fulham, a former borough
- London Borough of Hammersmith and Fulham

=== Australia ===
- Fulham, Queensland, Australia; a rural locality
- Fulham, South Australia, Australia; a suburb of Adelaide
- Fulham Island, Tasmania, Australia
- Fulham homestead, Victoria, Australia

== People ==
- Bishop of Fulham, Diocese of London, Church of England
- Edward Fulham (died 1694), Oxford professor
- George Fulham (1660–1702), English priest
- John Fulham (1699–1777), British cleric
- Rowena Fulham (née Nutira) (born 1960), New Zealand soccer player
- Thomas Fulham (1915–1995), U.S. businessman

== Sports ==
- Fulham Irish GAA Club, a gaelic football and hurling club based in West London, UK
- Fulham F.C., an English association football club based in Fulham, London, UK
  - Fulham L.F.C.
- Fulham, the original name of the rugby league team now known as Harlequins RL.

== Ships ==
- SS Fulham, a coastal tanker in service with J P Langford Shipping Ltd, Sharpness from 1966, renamed to Fulham in 1974.
- SS Empire Fulham, the Fullham, a WWII Empire ship

== See also ==
- Elizabeth Fulhame
