= Jacob Bobart the Younger =

English botanist (1641–1719)

Jacob Bobart, the younger
- Born: 2 August 1641; Oxford, England
- Died: 28 December 1719 (aged 78); Oxford, England
- Occupation: botanist
- Known for: superintendent of the Physic Garden, botanical professor at University of Oxford

Jacob Bobart, the younger, (2 August 1641 – 28 December 1719), was an English botanist.

== Background ==
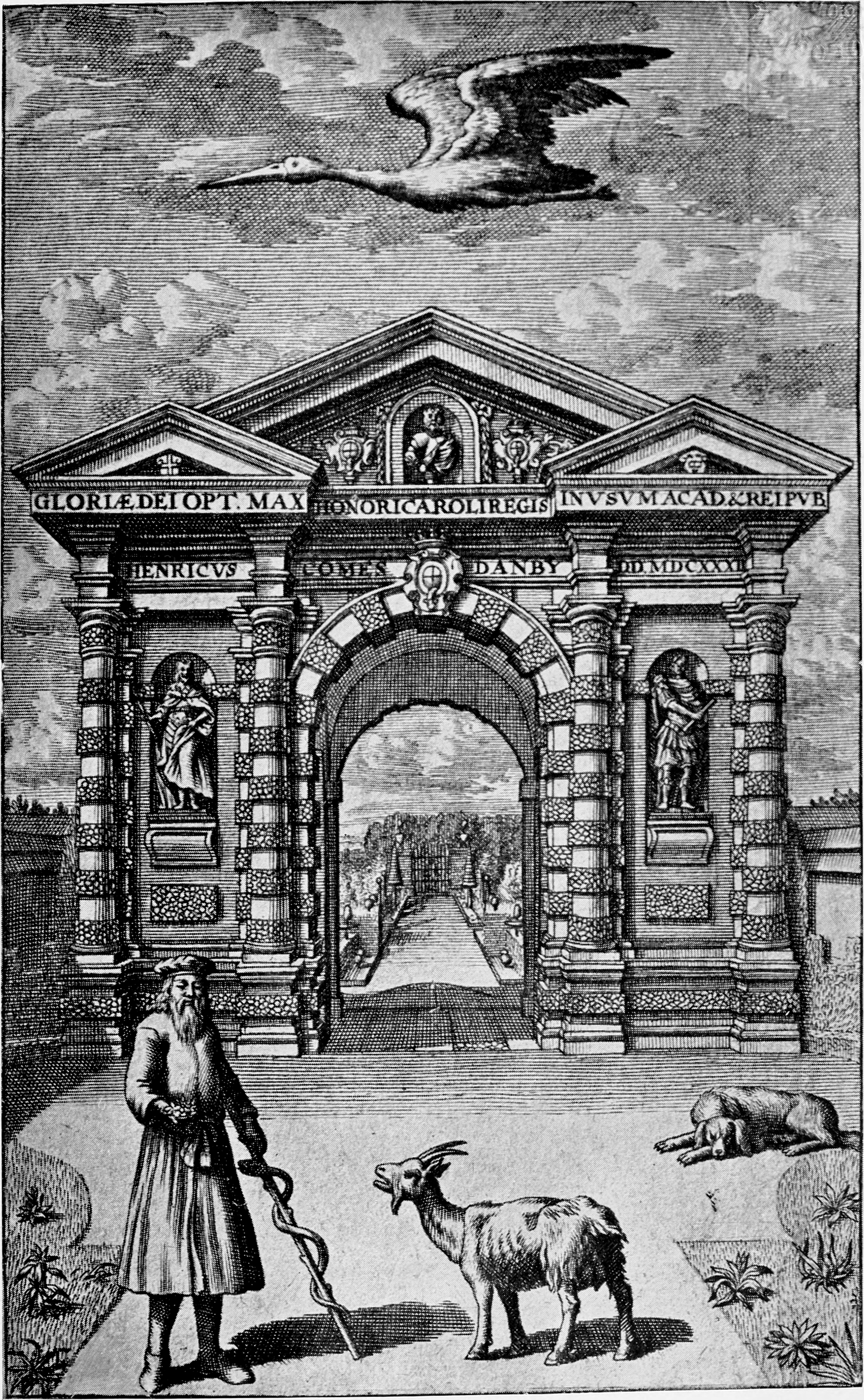
A sketch of the Physic Garden's Gate

Bobart was the younger son of Jacob Bobart. He was born at Oxford, and succeeded his father as superintendent of the Physic Garden, and on the death of Dr. Robert Morison in 1683, lectured as botanical professor. In 1699 he brought out the third part of Morison's Historia Plantarum, the second having been issued during the writer's life in 1680, whilst the first was never printed. In Zachary Grey's Notes on Hudibras occurs the following:

"Mr. Jacob Bobart, botany professor of Oxford, did about forty years ago (in 1704) find a dead rat in the Physic Garden, which he made to resemble the common picture of dragons by altering its head and tail, and thrusting in taper sharp sticks, which distended the skin on each side till it mimicked wings. He let it dry as hard as possible. The learned immediately pronounced it a dragon, and one of them sent an accurate description of it to Dr. Magliabechi, librarian to the Grand Duke of Tuscany. Several fine copies of verses were wrote upon so rare a subject; but at last Mr. Bobart owned the cheat. However, it was looked upon as a masterpiece of art, and as such deposited in the museum or anatomy school at Oxford".

== Resignation ==
Whilst he held this appointment he formed a "hortus siccus" according to the fashion of the times in twelve volumes folio, which is kept at the garden. He vainly tried for the post of curator to the Apothecaries' Garden at Chelsea in 1692. Consul William Sherard, who afterwards left his library and an endowment to the Oxford Garden, wrote in July 1719 that Vice-chancellor Shippen had compelled Bobart, 'my old master,' who was then in weak health, to resign the office of botanic professor, Dr. E. Sandys receiving the post. He says: "I am surprised the vice-chancellor hath obliged Mr. Bobart to resign his place... they ought to have let him spend the short remainder of his time in the garden." He died on 28 December 1719, and was buried two days later.

== Annals ==
Among the Sherardian letters in the library of the Royal Society are fourteen from Bobart to the consul, and in the 'Sloane MS.,' No. 3343, in the British Museum, are many of Bobart's memoranda of considerable gardening interest. An interleaved copy of Bauhin's Pinax, with copious annotations by Bobart, is in the botanical department of the Natural History Museum at Cromwell Road, and an interleaved copy of the Oxford Garden Catalogue, in the possession of the writer, has a few additions in same handwriting. The genus Bobartia was named in honour of the two Bobarts by Linnæus in the Amœnitates Academicæ.
