= Hugh Ashton =

English churchman

Hugh Ashton (died 1522) was an English churchman.

== Life ==
Ashton was a younger son of one of the Lancashire families of Ashton. He attracted the notice of Lady Margaret Beaufort, countess of Derby, who made him comptroller of her household. He commenced M.A. at Oxford 13 October 1507, but soon after had a grace from Cambridge to enter the canon law. He subsequently became canon and prebendary in St. Stephen's, Westminster, 1509; prebendary of Strensall, in the church of York, 1515; Archdeacon of Winchester, 1511 (resigned in 1519); archdeacon of Cornwall, 1515; and Archdeacon of York, 1516. Before 1511 he was rector of Grasmere, Ambleside, and he was also rector of Barnake, Lichfield. In 1522 he was instituted rector of Burton Latimer, Northamptonshire. He had been one of the executors of the will of his early patroness, and like her was interested in the fortunes of St. John's College, Cambridge.

Baker says: 'The last chapel was Mr. Hugh Ashton's well known by his monument and his rebus upon it, a thing then much in fashion, and must be forgiven to the humour of the age. It has long since lost the face of religion. Many years after its desecration, in Dr. Beal's time, it was restored to sacred use; but the times coming on when little regard was had to sacred things, and less to sacred places, it was again desecrated, and has not since been restored to such uses as the other two chapels yet standing have been. It may, 'tis hoped, one day recover the right; and might I choose my place of sepulture I would lay my body there, that as I owe the few comforts I enjoy to Mr. Ashton's bounty, so I might not be separated from him in my death.' This is an allusion to Ashton's foundations. The building accounts are given by Cooper and Mayor.

Whilst at Cambridge he was 'very serviceable' in the business of the college; but having to be away a great deal he made up for his nonresidence by his benefactions. 'What was wanting in that more public capacity he made up and supported in his private station by founding four fellows, who were his chaplains, and as many scholars, together with an annual dirge to be observed for him on the day of his interment.' According to Thomas Baker, who followed the inscription on his tomb at York, and copied in Queen Mary's reign by George Bullock, then master of St. John's, he died 23 November 1522, but C. H. Cooper and J. E. B. Mayor state that his will was dated 7 Dec. 1522, and proved 9 March following. 'Hic situs est,' runs the inscription, 'Hugo Ashton archidiaconus Ebor., qui ad Christianæ religionis augmentum socios 2 ex Lancastria totidemque scolares, sociumque et scholarem Eboracensis sociumque et scholarem Dunelmensis diœcesis oriundos, suis impensis pie instituit, atque singulis a se institutis sociis consuetum sociorum stipendium solidis 40 adauxit. Obiit nono cal. Decemb. an. Dui. 1522.' It is impossible to reconcile this date with that of the will. Ashton's Lancashire foundations were made available to candidates from the entire diocese of Chester. There was an inscription in the hospital of St. Leonard's at York recording Ashton's gift of a window. In addition to the prose tribute, some eulogistic verses, occasioned by a portrait of Ashton, were written by Baker, who bequeathed the picture to John Newcome, master of St. John's.
