= Michael Reniger =

English priest

Michael Reniger, D.D. was an English priest in the late 16th and early 17th centuries.

Reniger was educated at Magdalen College, Oxford. He held livings at Broughton, Crawley and Chilbolton. Reniger was appointed Chancellor of Lincoln Cathedral in 1566 (Precentor, 1567/ Subdean, 1568); Archdeacon of Winchester in 1575; and Canon of St. Paul's in 1583. He died on 26 August 1609.
