= John Fox (Archdeacon of Winchester) =

English priest

John Fox was an English priest in the 16th century.

Fox was educated at Corpus Christi College, Oxford. He held the living at Wroughton, Wiltshire. Fox was appointed an archdeacon of Winchester in 1519 and canon of Lincoln Cathedral in 1526. He died in 1530.
