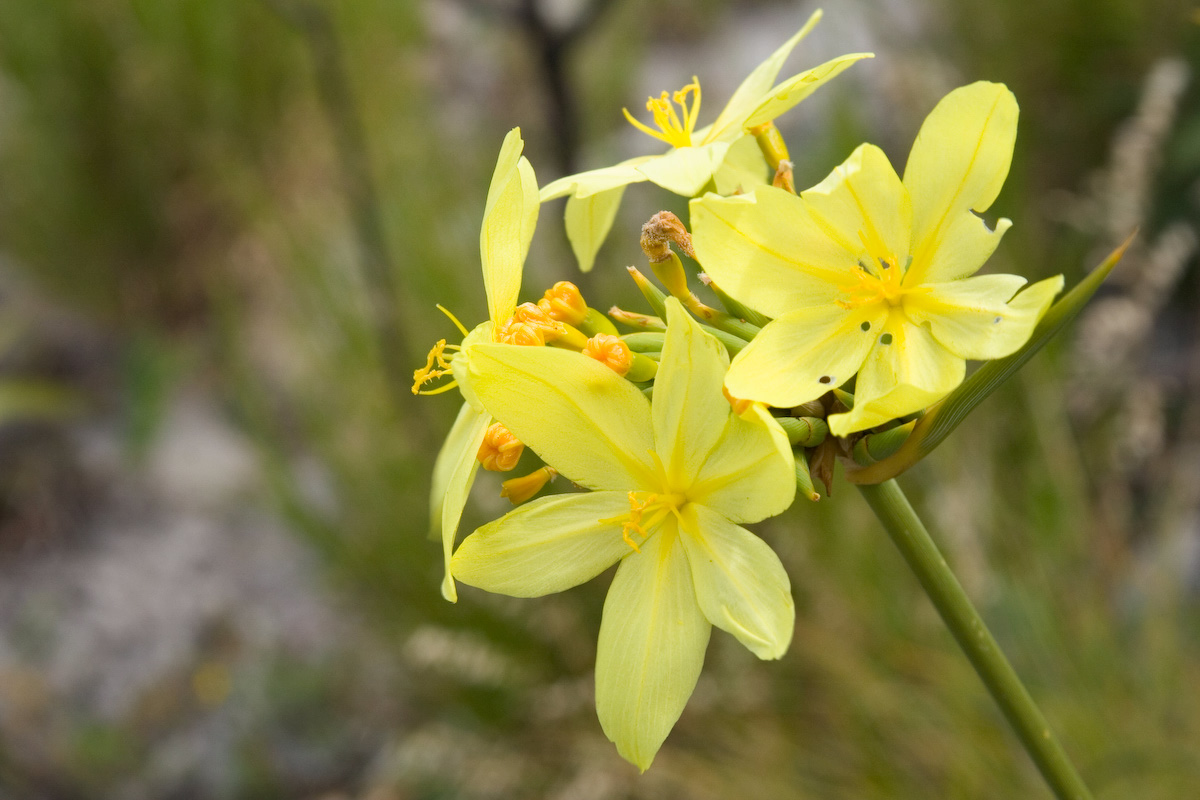
- Bobartia indica

Scientific classification
- Kingdom: Plantae
- Clade: Tracheophytes
- Clade: Angiosperms
- Clade: Monocots
- Order: Asparagales
- Family: Iridaceae
- Subfamily: Iridoideae
- Tribe: Irideae
- Genus: Bobartia; L.

Type species
- Bobartia indica L.

Species
- See text

= Bobartia =

Genus of flowering plants

Bobartia is a genus of evergreen, perennial and bulbous plants in the iris family (Iridaceae). The genus comprises 15 species distributed in South Africa. The genus name is a tribute to German botanist Jakob Bobart.

== List of species ==
- Bobartia aphylla (L.f.) Ker Gawl., Irid. Gen.: 30 (1827).
- Bobartia fasciculata Gillett ex Strid, Opera Bot. 37: 34 (1974).
- Bobartia filiformis (L.f.) Ker Gawl., Irid. Gen.: 30 (1827).
- Bobartia gladiata (L.f.) Ker Gawl., Irid. Gen.: 30 (1827).
  - Bobartia gladiata subsp. gladiata.
  - Bobartia gladiata subsp. major (G.J.Lewis) Strid, Opera Bot. 37: 24 (1974).
  - Bobartia gladiata subsp. teres Strid, Opera Bot. 37: 25 (1974).
- Bobartia gracilis Baker, Bull. Misc. Inform. Kew 1901: 134 (1901).
- Bobartia indica L., Sp. Pl.: 54 (1753).
- Bobartia lilacina G.J.Lewis, J. S. Afr. Bot. 11: 108 (1945).
- Bobartia longicyma Gillett, J. Bot. 68: 104 (1930).
  - Bobartia longicyma subsp. longicyma.
  - Bobartia longicyma subsp. magna Gillett ex Strid, Opera Bot. 37: 26 (1974).
  - Bobartia longicyma subsp. microflora Strid, Opera Bot. 37: 27 (1974).
- Bobartia macrocarpa Strid, Opera Bot. 37: 33 (1974).
- Bobartia macrospatha Baker, Handb. Irid.: 119 (1892).
  - Bobartia macrospatha subsp. anceps (Baker) Strid, Opera Bot. 37: 36 (1974).
  - Bobartia macrospatha subsp. macrospatha.
- Bobartia orientalis Gillett, J. Bot. 68: 104 (1930).
  - Bobartia orientalis subsp. occidentalis Strid, Opera Bot. 37: 33 (1974).
  - Bobartia orientalis subsp. orientalis.
- Bobartia paniculata G.J.Lewis, J. S. Afr. Bot. 7: 50 (1941).
- Bobartia parva Gillett, J. Bot. 68: 104 (1930).
- Bobartia robusta Baker, Handb. Irid.: 120 (1892).
- Bobartia rufa Strid, Opera Bot. 37: 37 (1974).

== Bibliography ==
- Goldblatt P, Rudall P. 1992. Relationships of the southern African genus Bobartia (Iridaceae-Iridoideae). S. Afr. J. Bot. 58. 304-9
- Strid AK. 1974 A taxonomic revision of Bobartia L. (Iridaceae) Opera bot., Lund,. No. 37. 1-45.
- Strid AK. 1974 A taxonomic revision of Bobartia L. (Iridaceae). : Op. Bot., no. 37. 45p. (1974).
