= Harbridge (surname) =

Harbridge is a surname. Notable people with the surname include:

- Bill Harbridge (1855–1924), American baseball player
- Brian Harbridge (1917–1983), New Zealand cricketer
- Sheridan Harbridge, Australian actor, writer and theatre director

== See also ==
- Harbidge, surname
