= George Roberts (priest) =

English priest

George Roberts, D.D. was an English priest in the 17th century.

Roberts was born in Oxfordshire and educated at St John's College, Oxford. He held livings at Shermanbury and Hambleden. Roberts was Archdeacon of Winchester from 1660 until his death in 1661.
