= Robert Eden (priest) =

English Anglican priest (1701–1759)

Robert Eden (26 August 1701 in Newcastle upon Tyne – 11 July 1759 in Winchester) was an English priest.

Eden was educated at Lincoln College, Oxford. He was incorporated at Cambridge in 1734.

He was Archdeacon of Winchester from 1743 until his resignation in 1749. He was then archdeacon again from 1756 until his death.
