= Edward Burby =

English priest

Edward Burby was an English priest in the 17th century.

Burby was born in London and educated at Lincoln College, Oxford. He held livings at Canewdon, East Woodhay and Wonston. Roberts was Archdeacon of Winchester from 1631 until his death on 2 June 1653.
