= George Roberts (carpenter) =

Canadian woodworker and businessman (1826–1899)

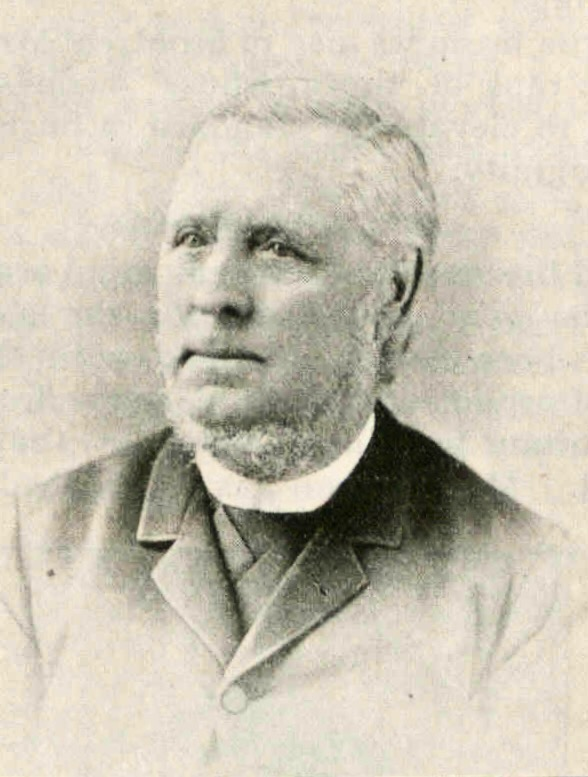
- Born: May 7, 1826; London, United Kingdom
- Died: August 26, 1899; Montreal, Canada
- Resting place: Mount Royal Cemetery

George Roberts, born May 7, 1826 in London, United Kingdom and died August 26, 1899 in Montreal, Canada, was a Canadian carpenter, joiner, cabinetmaker, plasterer and businessman of British origin.

== Biography ==
George Roberts was born on May 7, 1826, in Camden Town, London, United Kingdom. He emigrated to Canada in 1854 and worked for two years at Peto, Prassey & Co., building railways for the Grand Trunk Railway Company. In 1856, he founded his own carpentry, joinery, cabinetmaking, house painting, and plastering business, setting up shop in a warehouse at 597 De la Gauchetière Street in Montreal. During the life of his business, he sometimes employed more than 100 employees specializing in woodworking. His three sons, George Nelson, John James, and Edward Melbourne Roberts, gradually integrated the management of the company. He died in Montreal on August 26, 1899, almost a month after the death of his wife.

== The company ==
George Roberts' company specializes primarily in all types of woodworking. It carries out all structural work for a building, as well as all ornamental wood carving, joinery, and cabinetmaking. In terms of cabinetmaking and joinery, it custom-makes all utilitarian wooden furniture incorporated into a building: bookcases or shelves, display units, fireplace mantels, doors and windows, floors, etc. It also carries out all woodwork intended for ornamental purposes: columns, coffered ceilings, paneling, etc. Several types of wood are worked, including oak, cherry, pine, and mahogany.

== Works ==
Below is a non-exhaustive list of known achievements of George Roberts or his company:

Year	Work	Building	Location	Illustration
Between 1854 and 1856	Some wood works	Victoria Bridge	Montreal, Quebec, Canada	
Circa 1860	Carpentry and other wood works	William Dow House (Note: Notorial Act, minute no. 6779, June 23, 1860, A.N.Q.)	Square Beaver Hall , Montreal, Quebec, Canada	
Between 1861 and 1862	Carpentry and other wood works	Ravenscrag Mansion (Note: Notorial Act, minute no. 8136, July 30, 1861, A.N.Q.)	Pine Avenue, Montreal, Quebec, Canada	
Between 1864 and 1865	Carpentry and other wood works	Molson Bank Building (Note: Notorial Act, minute no. 10213, July 13, 1864, A.N.Q.)	Saint Jacques Street, Montreal, Quebec, Canada	
Between 1865 and 1866	Carpentry and other wood works	American Presbyterian Church	Corner of Dorchester and Drummond, Montreal, Quebec, Canada	
Circa 1865-66	General contractor / Carpentry and other wood works	Three "first-class villas" in the Italian or gothic styles	Côte-Saint-Antoine road in the Rosemount disctrict, Montreal, Quebec, Canada	
Circa 1867	General contractor / Carpentry and other wood works	Residence of Dr. Reddy	Corner of Saint Catherine Street and Phillips Square, Montreal, Quebec, Canada	
Circa 1867	General contractor / Carpentry and other wood works	Joseph Tiffin House	Corner of Sherbrooke and University streets, Montreal, Quebec, Canada	
Circa 1869-70	Carpentry and other wood works	St. Mark Church	Corner of Dalhousie and William Streets, Montreal, Quebec, Canada	
Circa 1870	Carpentry and other wood works	Grace Anglican Church	Corner of Wellington and Fortune Streets	
Circa 1881-82	Carpentry and other wood works	Redpath Museum	Sherbrooke Street, Montreal, Quebec, Canada	
1888	Carpentry and other wood works	Wilson Building	Craig street, Montreal, Quebec, Canada	
1888	Carpentry and other wood works	Nordheimer Building	Saint Jacques Street, Montreal, Quebec, Canada	
Between 1890 and 1893	Carpentry and other wood works	Macdonald Engineering Building (McGill University)	Sherbrooke Street, Montreal, Quebec, Canada	
Circa 1893	Carpentry and other wood works	Redpath Hall (McGill University)	Sherbrooke Street, Montreal, Quebec, Canada	
Circa 1896	Carpentry and other wood works	Marances de Rosay House (Note: Communauté Urbaine de Montréal 1987, p. 594)	Laval Avenue, Montreal, Quebec, Canada	
Circa 1899	Carpentry and other wood works	Benjamin Tooke House (Note: Communauté Urbaine de Montréal 1987, p. 719)	Doctor Penfield Avenue, Montreal, Quebec, Canada	

Also, according to an article published on December 6, 1902 in the Montreal Witness, George Roberts's firm carried out several works in "a large number of private residences on Sherbrooke, Drummond, etc." streets in Montreal.

== Sources ==
=== Notorial Acts ===
List of notorial acts in chronological order of publication:

- Smith, James (Notary) (October 4, 1858). Notorial Act en minute, min. no. 4545: "Contract and agreement between George Roberts and A. & S. Nordheimer". Notaries Records, Judicial District of Montreal: Superior Court Funds, National Archives of Quebec. AN-4545.
- Smith, James (Notary) (March 1, 1859). Notorial Act en minute, min. no. 4961: "Contract and agreement between George Roberts and A. Jones (?) (?)". Notaries Records, Judicial District of Montreal: Superior Court Funds, National Archives of Quebec. AN-4961.
- Smith, James (Notary) (April 16, 1859). Notorial Act en minute, min. no. 5168: "Contract and agreement between George Roberts and Mosely et al.". Notaries Records, Judicial District of Montreal: Superior Court Funds, National Archives of Quebec. AN-5168.
- Smith, James (Notary) (July 1, 1859). Notorial Act en minute, min. no. 5433: "Alexander Ramsay & Son to George Roberts: Protest". Notaries Records, Judicial District of Montreal: Superior Court Funds, National Archives of Quebec. AN-5433.
- Stewart Hunter, James (Notary) (April 21, 1860). Notorial Act en minute, min. no. 13750: "Contract and agreement between George Roberts and the Honorable John Hamilton". Notaries Records, Judicial District of Montreal: Superior Court Funds, National Archives of Quebec. AN-13750.
- Stewart Hunter, James (Notary) (April 30, 1860). Notorial Act en minute, min. no. 13797: "Contract and agreement between George Roberts and W. Kay". Notaries Records, Judicial District of Montreal: Superior Court Funds, National Archives of Quebec. AN-13797.
- Smith, James (Notary) (June 23, 1860). Notorial Act en minute, min. no. 6779: "Contract and agreement between Mr. George Roberts and William Dow, Esquire". Notaries Records, Judicial District of Montreal: Superior Court Funds, National Archives of Quebec. AN-6779.
- Stewart Hunter, James (Notary) (May 4, 1861). Notorial Act en minute, min. no. 6136: "Contract and agreement between George Roberts and James Hutton". Notaries Records, Judicial District of Montreal: Superior Court Funds, National Archives of Quebec. AN-6136.
- Smith, James (Notary) (July 30, 1861). Notorial Act en minute, min. no. 8136: "Contract and agreement between Mr. George Roberts and Hugh Allan, Esquire". Notaries Records, Judicial District of Montreal: Superior Court Funds, National Archives of Quebec. AN-8136.
- Stewart Hunter, James (Notary) (April 1, 1862). Notorial Act en minute, min. no. 6786: "Contract and agreement between George Roberts and The Mount Royal Cemetery". Notaries Records, Judicial District of Montreal: Superior Court Funds, National Archives of Quebec. AN-6786.
- Smith, James (Notary) (September 13, 1862). Notorial Act en minute, min. no. 9494: "Contract and agreement between Mr. George Roberts and Stark, Smith & Co.". Notaries Records, Judicial District of Montreal: Superior Court Funds, National Archives of Quebec. AN-9494.
- Smith, James (Notary) (July 16, 1863). Notorial Act en minute, min. no. 10765: "Contract and agreement between George Roberts and John Featherston". Notaries Records, Judicial District of Montreal: Superior Court Funds, National Archives of Quebec. AN-10765.
- Stewart Hunter, James (Notary) (August 31, 1863). Notorial Act en minute, min. no. 8878: "Contract and agreement between George Roberts and D. Sutterland". Notaries Records, Judicial District of Montreal: Superior Court Funds, National Archives of Quebec. AN-8878.
- Stewart Hunter, James (Notary) (September 24, 1863). Notorial Act en minute, min. no. 8972: "Contract and agreement between George Roberts and John Crawford". Notaries Records, Judicial District of Montreal: Superior Court Funds, National Archives of Quebec. AN-8972.
- Smith, James (Notary) (June 6, 1864). Notorial Act en minute, min. no. 12153: "Contract and agreement between George Roberts and Frederick Qeriken (?)". Notaries Records, Judicial District of Montreal: Superior Court Funds, National Archives of Quebec. AN-12153.
- Stewart Hunter, James (Notary) (July 13, 1864). Notorial Act en minute, min. no. 10213: "Contract and agreement between George Roberts and the Molson Bank". Notaries Records, Judicial District of Montreal: Superior Court Funds, National Archives of Quebec. AN-10213.
- Smith, James (Notary) (March 19, 1867). Notorial Act en minute, min. no. 16789: "Contract and agreement between George Roberts and Alexander McQheart (?)". Notaries Records, Judicial District of Montreal: Superior Court Funds, National Archives of Quebec. AN-16789.
- Stewart Hunter, James (Notary) (April 21, 1868). Notorial Act en minute, min. no. 13750: "Contract and agreement between George Roberts and the Honorable John Hamilton". Notaries Records, Judicial District of Montreal: Superior Court Funds, National Archives of Quebec. AN-13750.
- Stewart Hunter, James (Notary) (April 30, 1868). Notorial Act en minute, min. no. 13797: "Contract and agreement between George Roberts and William Kay". Notaries Records, Judicial District of Montreal: Superior Court Funds, National Archives of Quebec. AN-13797.
- Stewart Hunter, James (Notary) (March 13, 1869). Notorial Act en minute, min. no. 14744: "Contract and agreement between George Roberts and Hugh Allan". Notaries Records, Judicial District of Montreal: Superior Court Funds, National Archives of Quebec. AN-14744.
- Stewart Hunter, James (Notary) (May 28, 1869). Notorial Act en minute, min. no. 15026: "Contract and agreement between George Roberts and the War Department". Notaries Records, Judicial District of Montreal: Superior Court Funds, National Archives of Quebec. AN-15026.
- Stewart Hunter, James (Notary) (May 1, 1871). Notorial Act en minute, min. no. 16783: "Contract and agreement between George Roberts and The Protestant House of Industry and Refuge of Montreal". Notaries Records, Judicial District of Montreal: Superior Court Funds, National Archives of Quebec. AN-16783.

=== Newspaper Articles ===
- "New Buildings". Montreal Herald and Daily Commercial Gazette (Newspaper). Vol. 57, no. 301 (Robert Weir ed.). Montreal (Qc), Canada. December 19, 1865. p. 1.
- "New Buildings". Montreal Herald and Daily Commercial Gazette (Newspaper). Vol. 57, no. 303 (Robert Weir ed.). Montreal (Qc), Canada. December 21, 1865. p. 1.
- "Progress in Montreal". Montreal Herald and Daily Commercial Gazette (Newspaper). Vol. 59, no. 292 (Robert Weir ed.). Montreal (Qc), Canada. December 7, 1867. p. 2.
- "Church of Scotland. Laying Corner Stone of St. Mark's Church". Montreal Herald and Daily Commercial Gazette (Newspaper). Vol. 51, no. 303 (Robert Weir ed.). Montreal (Qc), Canada. October 25, 1869. p. 2.
- "Grace Church. Laying of the Foundation Stone". The Gazette (Newspaper). Vol. 99, no. 259 (Postmedia Network Inc. ed.). Montreal (QC), Canada. November 1, 1870. p. 2.
- "New Buildings. The new Warehouse and Factory on Craig Street". The Daily Witness (Newspaper). Vol. 29, no. 167 (John Dougall ed.). Montreal (Qc), Canada. July 18, 1888. p. 8.
- "Deaths. Eliza Augustine Styles Roberts". The Herald (Newspaper). Vol. 92, no. 172 (The Herald Company ed.). Montreal (Qc), Canada. July 24, 1899. p. 3.
- "Death of Mr. George Roberts". The Herald (Newspaper). Vol. 92, no. 202 (The Herald Company ed.). Montreal (Qc), Canada. August 28, 1899. p. 8.
- "The Late Mr. George Roberts". The Montreal Daily Star (Newspaper). Vol. 31, no. 201 (Montreal : Graham & Co., proprietors, 1881-1951 ed.). Montreal (Qc), Canada. August 28, 1899. p. 7.
- "The Late Mr. Roberts". The Herald (Newspaper). Vol. 92, no. 204 (The Herald Company ed.). Montreal (Qc), Canada. August 30, 1899. p. 3.
- "The Building Trade. Mr. George Roberts". The Daily Witness (Newspaper). Vol. 43, no. 287 (John Dougall ed.). Montreal (Qc), Canada. December 6, 1902. p. 15.

=== Administrative Document ===
- Roberts, George, ed. (1881–1889). Shop Pay sheet for 2 weeks (Cote BANQ : P1000,D822). Montreal (Qc), Canada: George Roberts. p. 450.

=== Book / Work ===
- Communauté Urbaine de Montréal (1987). Répertoire d'architecture traditionnelle sur le territoire de la Communauté Urbaine de Montréal : Les résidences (in French). Vol. 1. Montreal, Quebec: Service de la planification du territoire (CUM). ISBN 2-920295-56-X. CUM.

=== Website ===
- "Grave : George Roberts". Findagrave.com/. Montreal (Qc), Canada.
