= George Roberts (aircraft engineer) =

Australian aircraft engineer (1909–2009)

George Alexander Roberts (1909–2009) was the first aircraft maintenance apprentice employed by Qantas.

== Biography ==
George Roberts was born in the city of Ipswich, Queensland in the year 1909. By the age of 10 he had taken his first flight in an aircraft. He joined Qantas In 1936, as employee number 50.

After retiring in 1970, he continued to work part-time, managing the collection at the Heritage Centre.

He was awarded the Medal of the Order of Australia in 2003 "for service to the recording and preservation of aviation history, and to vintage and veteran car organisations."

At the time of his death he had become the longest-serving aircraft maintenance employee within Qantas.
