= Archdeacon of Bournemouth =

Church of England ecclesiastical office

The archdeacon of Bournemouth is a senior ecclesiastical officer within the Diocese of Winchester. The archdeacon is responsible for the disciplinary supervision of the clergy within the archdeaconry, which consists of six deaneries in the southern part of the diocese: Bournemouth, Christchurch, Eastleigh, Lyndhurst, Romsey and Southampton.

== History ==
A similar area of the diocese was previously supervised by the ancient archdeacons of Winchester, while the north (now the Winchester archdeaconry) was previously overseen by the archdeacon of Basingstoke.

== List of archdeacons ==
=== High Medieval ===
Senior archdeacons in the Diocese of Winchester

- bef. 1087–aft. 1078: William of Chichester
- bef. 1107–bef. 1116 (res.): Henri I de Blois (later Bishop of Verdun)
- bef. 1128–bef. 1139: Richard
- bef. 1139–1142 (res.): Josceline de Bohon
- bef. 1153–1153 (res.): Hugh de Puiset

Archdeacons of Winchester

- bef. 1154–aft. 1178: Ralph
- bef. 1181–aft. 1205: Roger (I)
- bef. 1213–aft. 1229: Bartholomew
- ?–1231 (d.): Roger (II)
- bef. 1236–aft. 1236: P. (I)
- bef. 1237–1253 (d.): Hugh des Roches
- bef. 1254–aft. 1256: P. (II)
- bef. 1257–aft. 1261: Amaury Guiscard
- aft. 1263–bef. 1275: Henry de Helingeye
- bef. 1280–aft. 1283: Richard de la More
- aft. 1285–aft. 1303: Philip of St Austell alias Cornwaleys

=== Late Medieval ===
- 10 June 1304 – 1304 (res.): Michael de Helleston
- 31 July 1304–aft. 1324: James Sinabaldi de Florentia or de Pulcis
- 1 April 1325–bef. 1328 (d.): Philip Sapiti
- 1328–1343 (d.): John de Podio Barzaco
- 1343–bef. 1345: Stephen de Malo Leone
- 1343: Ayquelinus Guillelmi de Sparra (opposed Malo Leone)
- 1345–bef. 1361 (d.): Robert de Burton
- 18 June 1361–bef. 1361 (res.): John de Wolveleye
- 18 October 1361–bef. 1372 (res.): Robert de Wykford
- 19 October 1372 – 29 November 1381 (res.): Nicholas de Wykeham
- 27 March 1382–bef. 1387 (d.): John Bloxham
- bef. 1386–23 February 1389 (ren): William Forrester (opposed Bloxham)
- 1387–1395 (res.): Roger Walden
- 16 October 1395–aft. 1404: Nicholas Daniel
- bef. 1428–aft. 1435: Nicholas Bildeston (simultaneously Dean of Salisbury for part of that time)
- ?–bef. 1450 (res.): Stephen Wilton
- 21 February 1450–bef. 1459 (res.): John Pakenham
- 24 July 1459–bef. 1475 (d.): Vincent Clement
- 5 March 1475 – 1478 (res.): John Morton
- bef. 1485–1486 (res.): Robert Morton
- 22 February 1487 – 1492: William Smyth
- bef. 1495–bef. 1502 (res.): Robert Frost
- 29 April 1502 – 8 October 1511 (res.): John Frost
- 22 October 1511 – 20 March 1520 (res.): Hugh Ashton
- 27 March 1520–March 1527 (exch.): John Fox
- March 1527–31 December 1529 (res.): Richard Pate
- 20 January 1530–October 1552 (d.): William Boleyn

=== Early modern ===
- 1552–bef. 1554 (deprived): John Philpot (deprived in 1554 and burnt for heresy, 18 December 1555)
- 12 March 1554–bef. 1572 (d.): Stephen Cheston
- 1 June 1572–bef. 1575 (res.): John Ebden
- 29 March 1575 – 26 August 1609 (d.): Michael Reniger
- 1609–20 July 1631 (d.): Ralph Barlow (also Dean of Wells from 1621)
- 22 September 1631 – 2 June 1653 (d.): Edward Burby
- 1660–bef. 1661 (d.): George Roberts
- 16 March 1661–bef. 1666 (res.): Thomas Gorges
- 26 April 1666 – 29 March 1684 (d.): Walter Dayrell
- 18 April–11 July 1684 (d.): Robert Sharrock
- 29 July 1684–bef. 1700 (d.): Thomas Clutterbuck
- 16 November 1700–bef. 1702 (d.): George Fulham
- 26 November 1702 – 25 March 1743 (d.): Ralph Brideoake
- 12 April 1743–bef. 1749 (res.): Robert Eden
- 20 April 1749 – 10 April 1750 (res.): Nicholas Lechmere
- 21 August 1750–bef. 1756 (res.): Robert Lowth
- 17 January 1756 – 11 July 1759 (d.): Robert Eden (again)
- 23 July 1759 – 19 January 1795 (d.): Thomas Balguy
- 6 July 1795 – 30 September 1807 (d.): Matthew Woodford
- 18 December 1807 – 11 August 1814 (res.): Thomas de Grey
- 2 September 1814 – 6 December 1819 (res.): Augustus Legge
- 9 December 1819 – 19 October 1829 (d.): Gilbert Heathcote
- 16 November 1829–bef. 1847 (res.): Charles Hoare
- 16 November 1847 – 1860 (res.): Joseph Wigram

=== Late modern ===
- 1860–20 December 1884 (d.): Philip Jacob
- 1884–1900 (res.): George Sumner (also Bishop suffragan of Guildford from 1888)
- 1901–19 February 1903 (d.): Arthur Lyttelton (also Bishop suffragan of Southampton since 1898)
- 1903–1920 (ret.): William Fearon
- 1920–29 October 1935 (d.): Alfred Daldy
- 1936–1943 (res.): Edmund Morgan
- 1943–1947 (res.): Hedley Burrows
- 1947–1962 (ret.): Leslie Lang, Assistant Bishop
- 1962–1973 (ret.): Roy Beynon (afterwards archdeacon emeritus)
- 1973–1984 (res.): David Cartwright
- 1984–1999 (ret.): Alan Clarkson (afterwards archdeacon emeritus)
- 1999–2000: Adrian Harbidge (became Archdeacon of Bournemouth)

In 2000, the ancient archdeaconry was renamed Bournemouth; the old Basingstoke archdeaconry was renamed Winchester.
Archdeacons of Bournemouth

- 2000–2010 (ret.): Adrian Harbidge (previously Archdeacon of Winchester)
- 2011–2020 (res.): Peter Rouch
- During 2021, rather than fill the Archdeaconry of Bournemouth, it was given to the Archdeacon of Winchester in plurality.
- 25 June 2023 – 6 February 2026 (res.): Jean Burgess (previously Archdeacon of Bolton and Salford; became Bishop suffragan of Grimsby)
- 2026: Gemma Foster

== Sources ==
- Greenway, Diana E. (1971), Fasti Ecclesiae Anglicanae 1066–1300, vol. 2, pp. 91–92
- Greenway, Diana E. (1971), Fasti Ecclesiae Anglicanae 1066–1300, vol. 2, pp. 92–93
- Jones, B. (1963), Fasti Ecclesiae Anglicanae 1300–1541, vol. 4, pp. 50–51
- Horn, Joyce M. (1974), Fasti Ecclesiae Anglicanae 1541–1857, vol. 3, pp. 86–87
