= Peter Rouch =

British Anglican priest

The Reverend Peter Rouch

Secretary General of The Mission to Seafarers
- Incumbent
- Assumed office 2024
- Preceded by: Andrew Wright

Chief Executive of Church Army
- In office 2021–2024
- Preceded by: Des Scott
- Succeeded by: Matt Barlow

Personal details
- Born: Peter Bradford Rouch; 22 April 1966 (age 60)
- Education: Sir Joseph Williamson's Mathematical School
- Alma mater: Brasenose College, Oxford; Westcott House, Cambridge; Peterhouse, Cambridge; University of Manchester
- Profession: Clergyman

Ecclesiastical career
- Religion: Christianity (Anglicanism)
- Church: Church of England
- Ordained: 1999 (deacon); 2000 (priest)
- Offices held: Archdeacon of Bournemouth (2011–2020)

Peter Bradford Rouch (born 22 April 1966) is a British Anglican priest. Since August 2024, he has been secretary general of The Mission to Seafarers. He was Archdeacon of Bournemouth in the Church of England's Diocese of Winchester from 2011 to 2020, and CEO of the Church Army from 2021 to 2024.

== Early life and education ==
Rouch was born on 22 April 1966 in Rochester, Kent, England. He was educated at Sir Joseph Williamson's Mathematical School, an all-boys grammar school in Rochester. He studied zoology at Brasenose College, Oxford, graduating with a bachelor's degree in 1987. He worked for Barclays Bank, before training for ordination at Westcott House, Cambridge from 1996 to 1999. While at Westcott, he also studied theology at Peterhouse, Cambridge, graduating with a further bachelor's degree in 1998.

== Career ==
=== Ordained ministry ===
Rouch was ordained in the Church of England as a deacon in 1999 and as a priest in 2000. He did his curacy at St John the Evangelist, East Dulwich in the Diocese of Southwark from 1999 to 2002. He was on the staff of St Stephen's House, Oxford as a junior research fellow from 2002 to 2004. During this time, he began studying for a PhD at the University of Manchester, which he completed in 2005 with a doctoral thesis titled "The Christian doctrine of time in negotiation with contemporary physics ". He was also chaplain to St John's College, Oxford for the 2003/2004 academic year.

Rouch returned to parish ministry and was Priest in charge of Miles Platting in the Diocese of Manchester from 2005 to 2011. This covered two parish's in a deprived are of inner-city Manchester. From 2007 to 2011, he was also an honorary research fellow at the University of Manchester. From 2011 to 2020, he was Archdeacon of Bournemouth in the Diocese of Winchester. He was elected to the General Synod of the Church of England in 2013.

In October 2020, Rouch left Winchester to join the staff at Church House, Westminster, working as principal external consultant for the "Transforming Effectiveness" programme.

Rouch has held permission to officiate in the Diocese of Sheffield since 2021 and the Diocese of London since 2025.

=== Outside the Church of England ===
Since May 2021, he has been Chief Executive of the Church Army, an evangelistic and mission community associated with the Church of England. In February 2024, it was announced that he would be the next secretary general of The Mission to Seafarers. He took up the post on 1 August 2024.

== Personal life ==
In 1994, Rouch married Tracey. They have two daughters.
