= Thomas Gorges (priest) =

English priest

Thomas Gorges, D.D. (13 February 1603 – 12 December 1667) was an English priest in the 17th century.

Gorges was born in Wraxall, Somerset, and educated at The Queen's College, Oxford. He became a Fellow of All Souls College, Oxford, in 1629. He became Archdeacon of Winchester and a Canon of Westminster in 1661, holding both positions until his death.
