= John Philpot =

English Protestant martyr

- Born: December 1515; Compton, Hampshire
- Died: 18 December 1555 (aged 39–40); Smithfield, London
- Cause of death: burnt at the stake
- Occupation: priest
- Spouse: none
- Children: none
- Parent(s): Sir Peter Philpot (d. 1540) and Agnes Troyes
- Relatives: Siblings: William (d. 1535/36), Jane, Thomas (d. 1586), Edward, Anne, Henry (d.1567), Elizabeth, Richard, Anthony, Francis

Academic background
- Education: Winchester College
- Alma mater: New College Oxford

Academic work
- Discipline: Bachelor of Civil Law

John Philpot (1515–18 December 1555) was an Archdeacon of Winchester and an English Protestant martyr. He was burned at the stake in Smithfield on 18 December 1558. The story of his imprisonment and execution is recorded in Foxe's Book of Martyrs published in 1563.

== Early life and family ==
John Philpot was the third son of Sir Peter Philpot and Agnes Troyes. He was born at Compton, Hampshire, in 1515. He had seven brothers, William, Thomas, Edward, Henry, Richard, Anthony and Francis, and three sisters, Jane, Anne and Elizabeth. William was rector of Compton from 1534 but died in 1535/36. Thomas, the second eldest brother was judged "a wandering lunatic" in 1538 but recovered by 1556 and was able to claim all his late father's estates. He died in 1586 and was the only son of Sir Peter to have male heirs. Henry had inherited most of his father's estates but lost custody of them upon the recovery of his elder brother Thomas. The male heirs of (Sir) Thomas died out in the 1650s at which time the Philpot estates, in the absence of a male heir, reverted to the Lisles of Wootton.

== Education ==
He was educated at Winchester College, where he had as a contemporary John Harpsfield, with whom he made a bet that he would write two hundred verses in one night without making more than three faults, which he did. In due course he went to New College, Oxford, where he was Fellow from 1534 to 1541. Anthony Wood claims that his Fellowship was made void in 1541 because of his prolonged absence from the College He had graduated B.C.L (Bachelor of Civil Law).

As a Fellow of New College, Oxford, he came under the charge of Thomas Cromwell's zealous enforcer of monastery closures, Dr John London, Warden since 1528. New College at the time was a crucible for orthodox and radically Protestant views where Frith's A Disputacyon of Purgatory was widely circulated. it is probable that John Philpot became a protégé of Thomas Cromwell from around 1536.

== Travels ==
In February 1538 John Husee, Lord Lisle's agent, writing to Lady Lisle, extolled the virtues of Sir Peter Philpot's third son and arrangements were made for him to travel to Calais to join the Lord Deputy of Calais' household. It would appear that he stayed there for only a short time before setting out for Italy. In 1540 a certain Clement Philpot, a member of the Lord Lisle's household was executed for treason. It has been assumed elsewhere that Clement was the third son of Sir Peter Philpot. The evidence is that Clement Philpot was no relation of John Philpot's family.

The enactment of the Six Articles in 1539 may have provided the incentive for him to travel abroad. He certainly visited Rome where he assisted John Christopherson, who, later, as bishop of Chichester, was one of Philpot's interrogators at his trial Between Venice and Padua he fell into an argument with a Franciscan friar, and very narrowly escaped the inquisition in consequence. In Padua he came under the influence of Coelius Secundus Curio who held the chair of Humanist Letters there from 1536 to 1541 and he translated Curio's Pro Vera at Antiqua Ecclesiae Christi Autoritate into Defence of the Old and Ancient Authority of Christ's Church.

== Return to Winchester ==
On his return to Winchester, according to his own account, he was promised by bishop Stephen Gardiner the post of archdeacon upon the death of the incumbent. However, wherever he could, he preached his strongly held Protestant views including lectures on the Epistles of Saint Paul to the Romans and by 1548 had become a serious source of irritation to the bishop who wrote to Protector Somerset (Edward Seymour) complaining about Philpot's behaviour, by which Philpot would "infect by contagion" those who talked with him and they would be "entered into madness.". Gardiner was deprived of his bishopric in 1550.

Early in 1552 he was appointed archdeacon of Winchester. He succeeded William Boleyn who had died in February. On 27 May he 'compounded' an agreement to pay the heavy tax on new appointments known as the First Fruits (or Annates). He was clearly a difficult man. In 1552/53 he took proceedings against Winchester College in the Court of Arches by which the College incurred some considerable expense. Later he had a serious disagreement with his Protestant bishop, John Ponet, whom the registrar Cooke, ' a man who hated pure religion' had stirred up against him. Cooke even set on the archdeacon with his servants as if to murder him.

== Convocation and Imprisonment ==
After the accession of Mary Tudor to the English throne a Convocation was called for October 1553. Most of the delegates attending the Convocation were conservative Catholic supporters of Mary Tudor but half a dozen or so adhered to the Protestant beliefs which had been strongly advocated during the previous reign. The Convocation was held in St. Paul's cathedral from 20 to 30 October. One of the attending Protestants was John Philpot. He left an account of the Disputationis (see Writings below) that took place at the Convocation. His Disputationis were published within the next two years for they were known to his interrogators at his trial in late 1555. They are written in the third person and include extensive dialogue largely between Philpot and a number of senior churchmen. Amongst other things he strongly defended the views of the current Catechism (now disavowed by his interlocutors), and argued over the Sacrament and the Catholic belief in transubstantiation.

The Convocation ended on the 30th October and Philpot was taken away to the King's Bench prison in Southwark. He remained in prison for the remaining two years of his life. During this time he managed to smuggle out of the prison his Disputationis, some letters and, much later on, during his trial his 'Examinations', that is, the account of most of his trial. Most of the letters are intended to provide spiritual comfort to persons unknown, three are to John Careless, a fellow prisoner, five are to Lady Elizabeth Fane (or Vane), a liberal supporter of persecuted Protestants and one is to a sister warning her that she is in danger of "drinking from the cup" of the whore of Babylon, by which he means the Catholic Church. He also asks her to ensure through their brother Thomas that the sureties that stood in for him in 1552 when he entered into an agreement to pay the First Fruits tax would be fully recompensed.

== Trial and martyrdom ==
In 1554 he was in the King's Bench Prison, and even there he found something to dispute about, as some of his fellow prisoners were Pelagians. On 2 October 1555 he was brought before a number of examiners at the Newgate Sessions Hall. These 'Examinations' continued at a number of different sites. He was held and examined in bishop Edmund Bonner's coal house for an extensive period of time (and put in Bonner's private stocks on at least two occasions). There he encountered, in the 'blind house', adjoining the coal house one Thomas Whittle, a married Protestant minister who had been assaulted by bishop Bonner for renouncing an earlier 'confession'. (Whittle was executed in 1556.) Eventually Philpot was taken to a high tower 'right on the other side of Lollard's tower, as high almost as the battlements of St. Paul's' to a cell 8 feet by 13 feet with views over the great houses near the cathedral. These 'Examinations' during October, November and December were conducted by a wide range of academics and senior clergy, including the archbishop of York, at one session. However the foremost examiner throughout was the bishop of London, Edmund Bonner. This allowed Philpot to argue that the Court was not legitimate because he should only be tried by his own bishop, that is, the bishop of Winchester, Stephen Gardiner (whose bishopric had been restored to him on the accession of Mary Tudor). A consistent theme of these 'Examination' is that Philpot was a very learned, difficult and argumentative man who exasperated everyone of his interlocutors. The Court was dismissed on 16 December and he was formally declared a heretic. He was burned at the stake at Smithfield on 18 December displaying great courage, according to Foxe's Book of Martyrs.

== Writings ==
The list provided below is taken from the Dictionary of National Biography.

His 'Apologie ... for spitting upon an Arian' concerned itself with Arianism which is the belief that Jesus was the son of God, was begotten by God, but was not one with God. Thus the Holy Trinity was denied.

The footnote below is also taken from the Dictionary of National Biography.

Philpot wrote :

1. 'Vera Expositio Disputationis', an account of the proceedings in Convocation, printed in Latin at Rome, 1554, and in English at Basle, and afterwards printed in Foxe's ' Actes and Monuments.'
2. 'Examinations', published London, 1559. Foxe published a Latin translation of this abroad, and it appears in the ' Actes and Monuments.' To one edition of this was added
3. 'Apologie of John Philpot' written for spitting upon an Arian; a second edition appeared the same year (1559).
4. 'A Supplication to Philip and Mary,' published by Foxe in the 'Actes and Monuments.'
5. 'Letters', also published in the 'Actes and Monuments', and separately 1564.
6. 'Caelius Secundus Curio : his Defence of th' Olde and Awncyent Authoritie off Christe's Churche'; this translation forms Reg. MS. 17, C. ix.
7. 'De Vero Christiani Sacrificio.'
8. A translation of Calvin's ' Homilies.'
9. 'Chrysostome against Heresies.'
10. 'Epistolae Hebraicae' lib. i.
11. 'De proprietate Linguarum' lib. i.

The last five are lost. An exhortation to his sister and an oration which forms Bodl. MS. 53 are also small works. There are said to be some manuscripts written by Philpot in the library at Emmanuel College, Cambridge. All the extant works have been published, with an introduction, for the Parker Society by Robert Eden, London, 1842, 8vo.

== DNB references ==
[Wood's Athenae Oxon. ed. Bliss, ii. 229; Introd. to Parker Soc. edition of Philpot's Works; Heylyn's Ecclesia Restaurata, i. 68. &c., ii. 109, &c.; Letters and Papers of Henry VIII, xi. 1 247, xii. pt. i. p. 340, cf. p. 430; Dixon's Hist, of Church of England, iv. 7–5, &c.; Foxe's Actes and Monuments, vi. 66, &c., vii. 605, viii. 121, 171; Machyn's Diary (Camden Soc.), p. 98; Kirby's Winchester Scholars, p. 114.] W. A. J. A.
