= Charles Hoare (priest) =

Charles James Hoare (14 July 1781 in London – 15 January 1865 in Godstone) was an evangelical Church of England clergyman, archdeacon of Surrey.

== Life ==
Charles James Hoare was third son of the banker Henry Hoare (1750–1828), a partner in Hoare's Bank and one of the founders of the Church Missionary Society; his mother was Lydia Henrietta (d. 19 July 1816), daughter and coheiress of Isaac Malortie of Hanover and London, merchant.

Hoare was educated under the Rev. John Simons of St Paul's Cray, Kent, and at St John's College, Cambridge, where he was admitted a Pensioner on 7 May 1799. Here among his friends were Henry Martyn, the brothers Charles and Robert Grant, Archdeacon Thomas Dealtry, and J. W. Cunningham. In 1803 he passed as second wrangler, second Smith's prizeman, and second classical medallist, graduated B.A. in the same year and M.A. in 1806, and was Seatonian prizeman in 1807. On 24 March 1806 he was chosen Lady Margaret fellow of his college, and was ordained in 1804 as curate to Dr. Thomas Rennell, dean of Winchester and vicar of Alton, Hampshire. In 1807 he was appointed vicar of Blandford Forum, Dorsetshire, where he won numerous friends. He removed to the family living of Godstone, near Reigate, Surrey, in March 1821, which he held for the remainder of his life. In 1829 he became rural dean of South-east Ewell, on 10 Nov. in the same year Archdeacon of Winchester, and on 2 Dec. 1831 a canon residentiary of Winchester Cathedral.

He interested himself in the defence of the Irish church, the maintenance of cathedral establishments in their integrity, and the cause of education. He was a great supporter of religious societies, and held a yearly missionary gathering at Godstone vicarage. On 14 Nov. 1847 he was transferred to the archdeaconry of Surrey. He chiefly directed his energies to providing further church accommodation for the populous districts on the south side of London. Among his more intimate acquaintances were Hannah More, Wilberforce, the Thorntons, Venn, Macaulay, and Simeon. He resigned his archdeaconry in 1860. He died at Godstone vicarage on 15 January 1865, and was buried in a vault in the churchyard on 21 January.

He married, on 4 July 1811, Jane Isabella, only daughter of Richard Holden of Moorgate, Yorkshire. She died on 15 Nov. 1874, having had seven children.

== Works ==
- The Shipwreck of St. Paul. A Seatonian Prize Poem, 1808; another edition 1860.
- Thoughts suited to the Present Crisis, in three Sermons preached for National Schools, 1820.
- Sermons on the Christian Character, with Occasional Discourses, 1821.
- The Course of Divine Judgments, eight Lectures on the Impending Pestilence, 1832.
- The Prebendary or Cathedral Establishments, Ancient and Modern, 1837, 1838, 2 parts.
- Remains of C. J. Paterson, ed. by C. J. Hoare, 1838.
- A Letter to the Bishop of London on the Cathedral Question, 1840.
- The Holy Scriptures, their Nature, Authority, and Use, 1845; second ed. 1857.
- Baptism, or the Ministration of Public Baptism of Infants scripturally illustrated, 1848.
- Church Rates, the Question of the Day, considered, 1856.
