= Adrian Harbidge =

Adrian Guy Harbidge (born 10 November 1948) was an Archdeacon in the Diocese of Winchester in the late 20th and early 21st centuries.

Harbidge was educated at Marling School; Durham University; and Cuddesdon Theological College, Cuddesdon. After an earlier career as a Purser in the Merchant Navy he was ordained Deacon in 1975, and Priest in 1976. He was a Curate at Romsey Abbey from 1975 to 1980 then Vicar of St Andrew, Bournemouth until 1986. He was the incumbent at Chandler's Ford from 1986 to 1999; and Rural Dean of Eastleigh from 1993 to 1999. He became Archdeacon of Winchester in 1999; and then (a change of title but not of job) of Bournemouth in 2000. In 2010 he became Rector of Seale, Puttenham and Wanborough (in Guildford Diocese) before retiring at the end of 2016.
