= George Fulham =

English priest

George Fulham, D.D. (b Hampton Poyle 14 December 1660 - d Southampton 23 November 1702) was an English priest in the late 17th and early 18th centuries.

Fulham was educated at Christ Church, Oxford. He was a Fellow of Magdalen College, Oxford, from 1682 to 1691. He held livings at Compton, Surrey, West Meon, Droxford and Southampton. He became Archdeacon of Winchester in 1700, and held the post until his death.
