= Jacob Bobart the Elder =

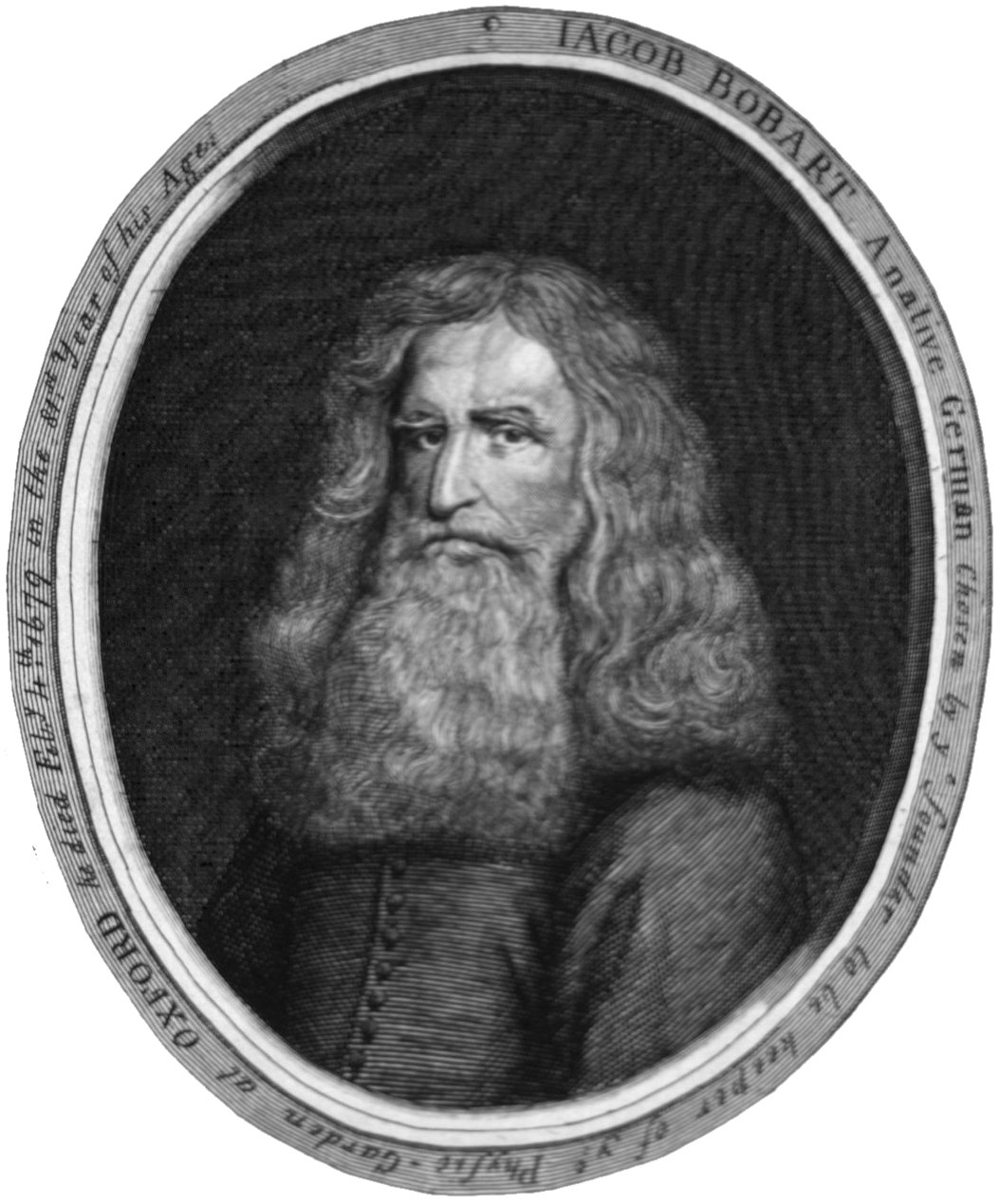

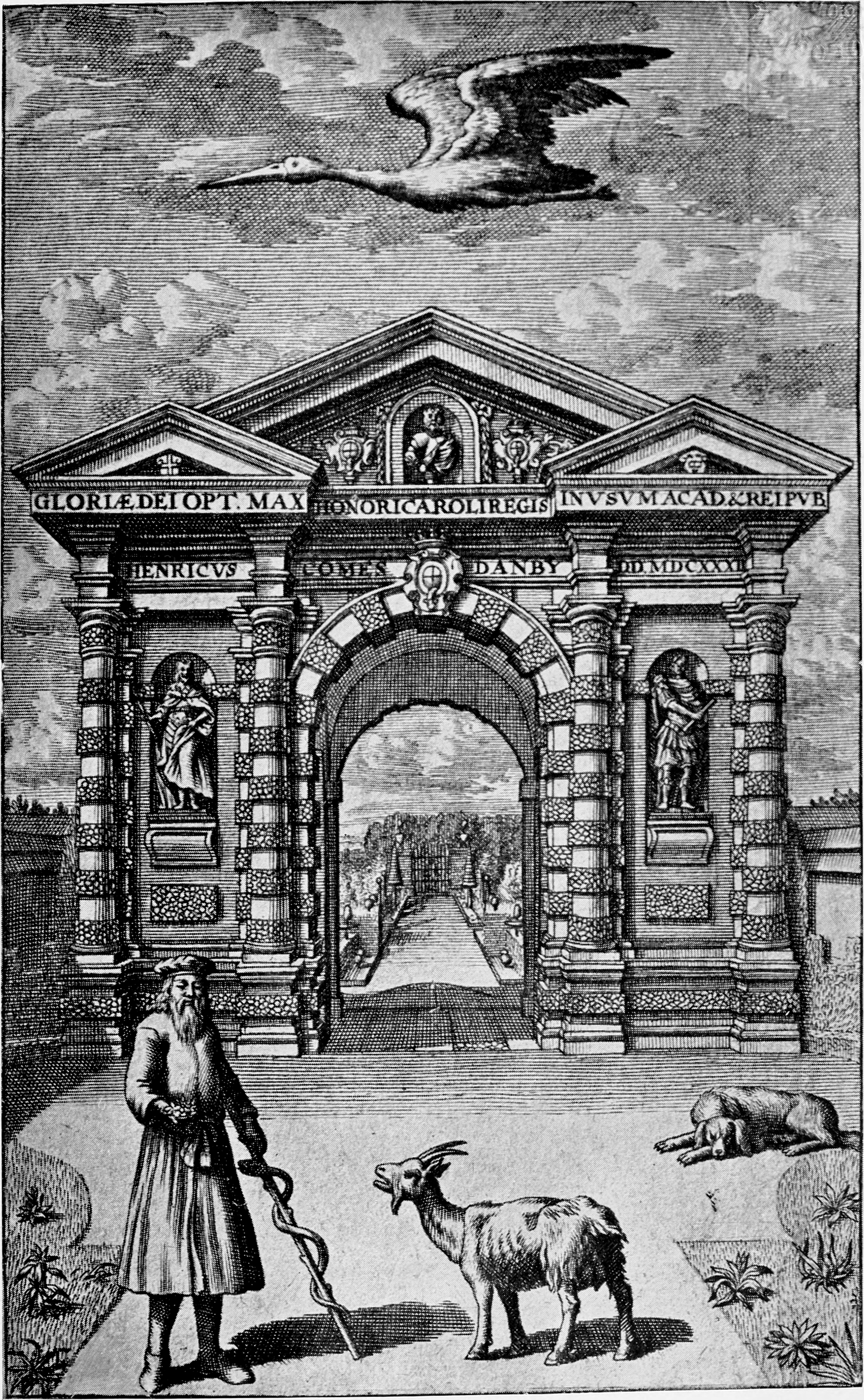
Great Gate of the Physic Garden, Oxford with Bobart in the foreground

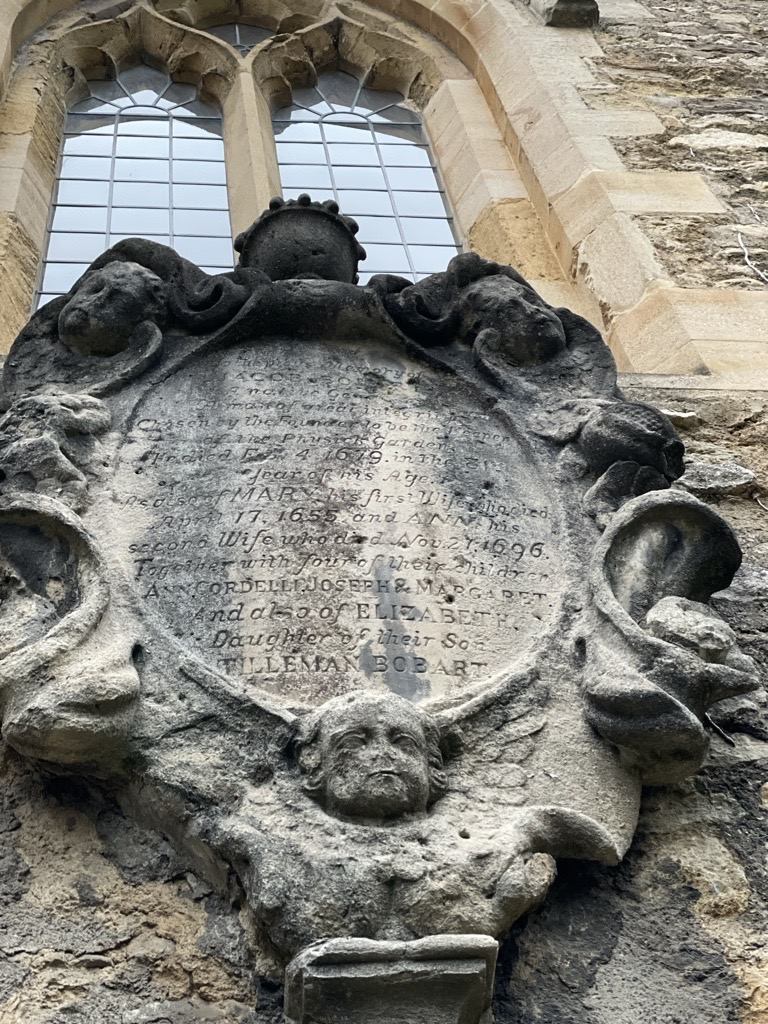
Memorial plaque for Jacob Bobart the Elder on the South wall of St-Peter-in-the-East, the library church of St Edmund Hall

Jacob Bobart (or Bobert), the Elder (1599–1680) was a German botanist who moved to England to be the first head gardener of Oxford Botanic Garden.

== Life ==
He was born at Brunswick, and was appointed superintendent of the Oxford Physic Garden (as it then was) after its foundation in 1632 as the first such garden in England by Henry Danvers, 1st Earl of Danby, John Tradescant the Elder having turned down the position. Bobart arrived by 1641. He had the right to sell fruit and vegetables from the garden, which proved a necessity in the circumstances that Danvers died and the English Civil War meant that his estates were sequestrated. He planted many yew trees in pairs.

In 1648 he published an anonymous catalogue, in alphabetical order, of sixteen hundred plants then under his care ('Catalogus plantarum horti medici Oxoniensis, scil. Latino-Anglicus et Anglico-Latinus'); this was revised in 1658 in conjunction with his son, Jacob Bobart the Younger, Dr. Philip Stephens, and William Brown.

Little seems to be known of his life; portraits show his magnificent beard and there is Granger's statement that 'on rejoicing days he used to have his beard tagged with silver,' and a goat followed him instead of a dog. He died on 4 February 1680 at the garden house, and was buried in the churchyard of St Peter-in-the-East, where there is a tablet to his memory. He was married twice, leaving houses to his sons Jacob and Tilleman (or Tillemant), and legacies also to six daughters.
