= Richard Grey, 6th Earl Grey =

British hereditary peer (1939–2013)

Richard Fleming George Charles Grey, 6th Earl Grey (4 March 1939 – 10 September 2013) was a British hereditary peer.

In 1963, he inherited a seat in the House of Lords. In 1999 he was one of those who lost their seats as a result of the House of Lords Act 1999.

== Early life and education ==
The son of Albert Harry George Campbell Grey and his wife Vera Harding, Grey was born at Slough. His father, who was a trooper in the Canadian Armoured Corps was the son of George Archibald Grey (1886–1952) and his wife Margery Campbell, a daughter of William Wilfred Campbell, the Canadian poet; grandson of Francis William Grey (1860–1939), an academic of Ottawa University, who was the son of Admiral George Grey (1809–1891), a younger son of Charles Grey, 2nd Earl Grey.

Grey was educated at Hounslow College and Hammersmith College of Art and Building, training as a quantity surveyor.

== Career ==
Grey began his working life as a quantity surveyor, but did not get on well with the work. He moved into hotel management, frozen food, and public relations, and also launched Earl Grey Biscuits.

In 1963, he succeeded as Earl Grey, following the death of Charles Grey, 5th Earl Grey, his second cousin twice removed, although he did not inherit the family seat of Howick Hall and its estate, as the 5th Earl broke the entail on the estate and gave it to his grandson Charles Baring, the son of his daughter Lady Mary, wife of Evelyn Baring, 1st Baron Howick of Glendale.

From 1976, Grey became a full-time member of the House of Lords, taking the Liberal Party whip. He was the Liberal spokesman on social services and disability issues. He also served as secretary to the House of Lords small business group from 1980 to 1984.

He was an official observer of elections across Africa, including the 1980 Southern Rhodesian general election.

In February 1982, Grey became chairman of a company operating sex shops and publishing pornography. In July 1983, along with four other men, including a former governor of Norwich Prison, he was remanded on bail after they were accused of jointly living off the earnings of prostitution.

He was chairman of the London Cremation Company, based in Golders Green, and served as president of the Cremation Society of Great Britain from 1992 until his death.

He died on 10 September 2013, aged 74. His funeral was held at Golders Green Crematorium on 15 October 2013.

He was succeeded in the earldom by his younger brother, Philip Kent Grey, 7th Earl Grey, who was born 11 May 1940.

== Personal life ==
Earl Grey married twice.

He married Margaret Ann Bradford, daughter of Henry G. Bradford of Ashburton, Devon in 1966; they divorced in 1974. Later the same year on 17 August 1974 he married Stephanie Caroline, former widow of Surgeon-Commander Neil Lancaster Denham, RN, and only daughter of Donald Gaskell-Brown of Newton Ferrers, Devon.

== Arms ==
Coat of arms of Richard Grey, 6th Earl Grey
Crest A scaling ladder or, hooked and pointed sable. Escutcheon Gules, a lion rampant, within a bordure engrailed, argent, in dexter chief point a mullet or. Supporters Dexter, a lion guardant purpure, ducally crowned or; sinister, a tiger guardant, proper. Motto De bon vouloir servir le roy (To serve the king with good will).

Creations: Baronetcy (GB) 11 Jan 1745/6, Baron (UK), 23 June 1801, Earl and Viscount (UK), 11 April 1806.

== See also ==
- Earl Grey

Peerage of the United Kingdom
Preceded by Charles Robert Grey	Earl Grey; 1963 – 2013	Succeeded by Philip Kent Grey
