= St Michael and All Angels Church, Howick =

St Michael's Church
- St Michael and All Angels Church
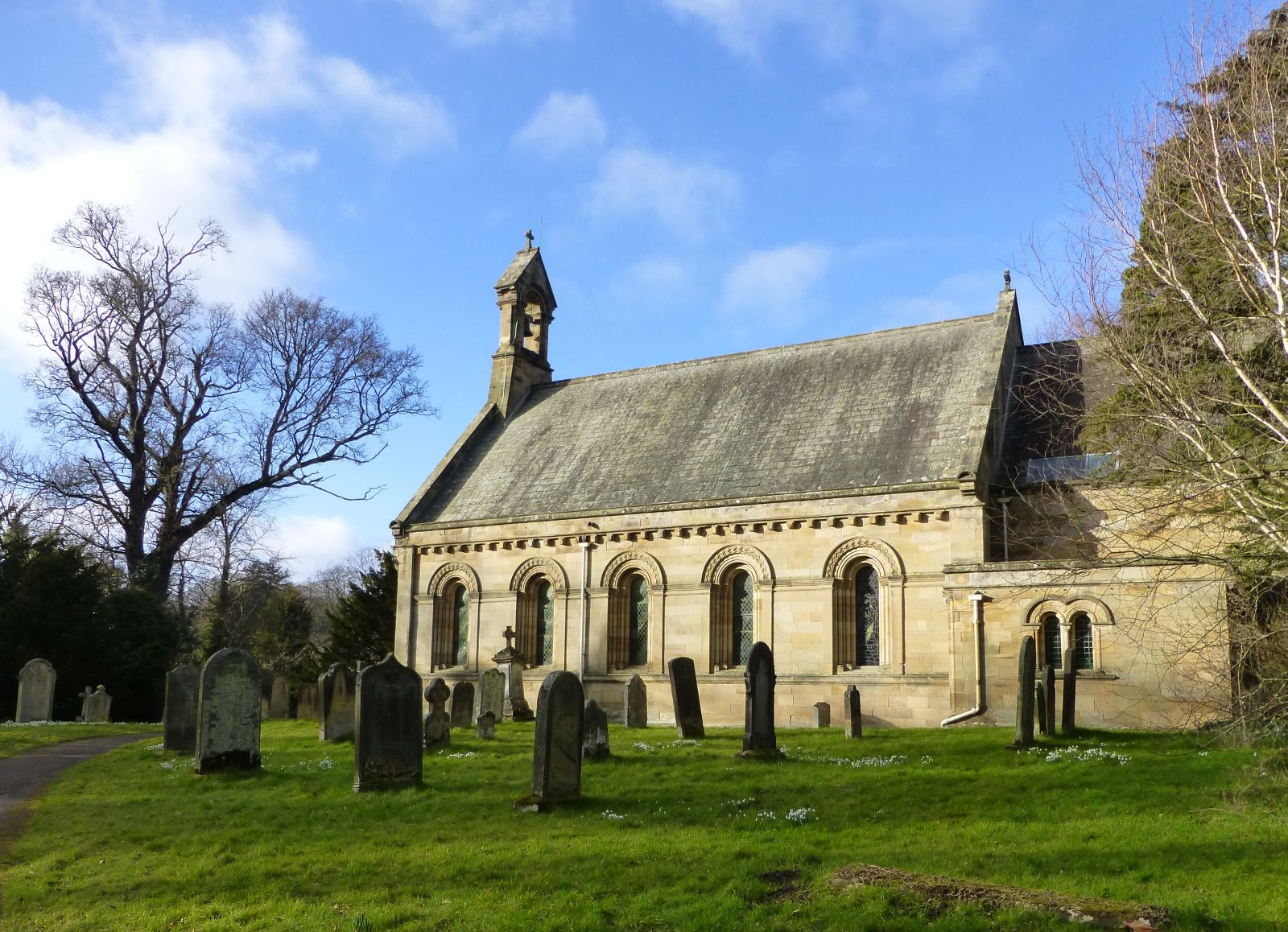
- St Michael's Church
- 55°26′59.363″N 1°36′31.093″W
- Location: Gardens of Howick Hall
- Country: England
- Denomination: Church of England

History
- Status: Parish church
- Founded: c. 12th century
- Dedication: Archangel Michael and all the angels

Architecture
- Functional status: Active
- Heritage designation: Grade II
- Designated: 31 December 1969
- Architect: FJ Francis
- Style: Neo-Norman and Romanesque
- Completed: 1849

Specifications
- Materials: Sandstone

Administration
- Province: York
- Diocese: Newcastle
- Archdeaconry: Northumberland

St Michael and All Angels Church is a Church of England parish church located within the grounds of the gardens of Howick Hall in the village of Howick, Northumberland, England. The church is recorded in the National Heritage List for England as a designated Grade II listed building, receiving around twenty thousand visitors annually.

== History and features ==
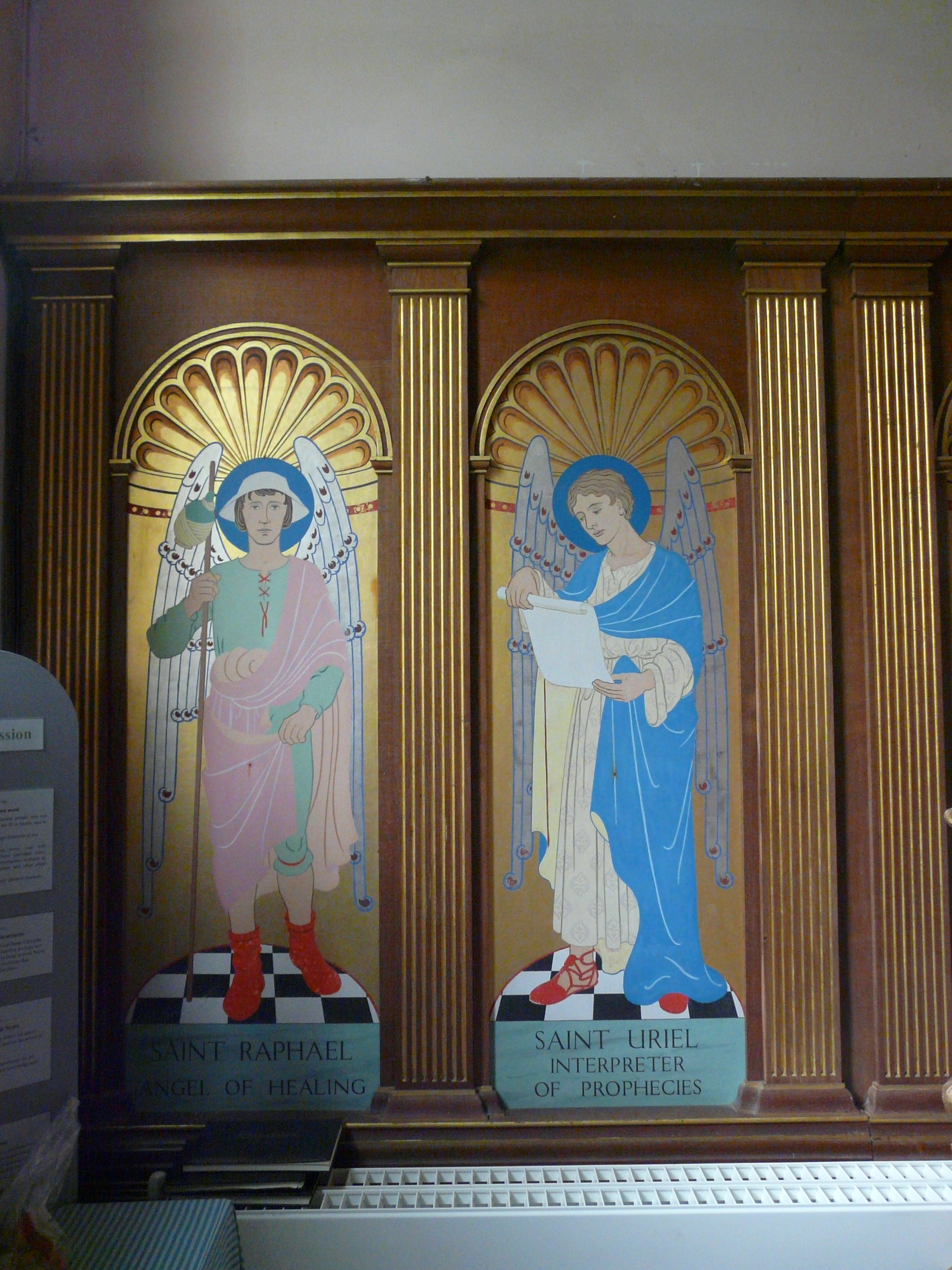
Raphael, Uriel

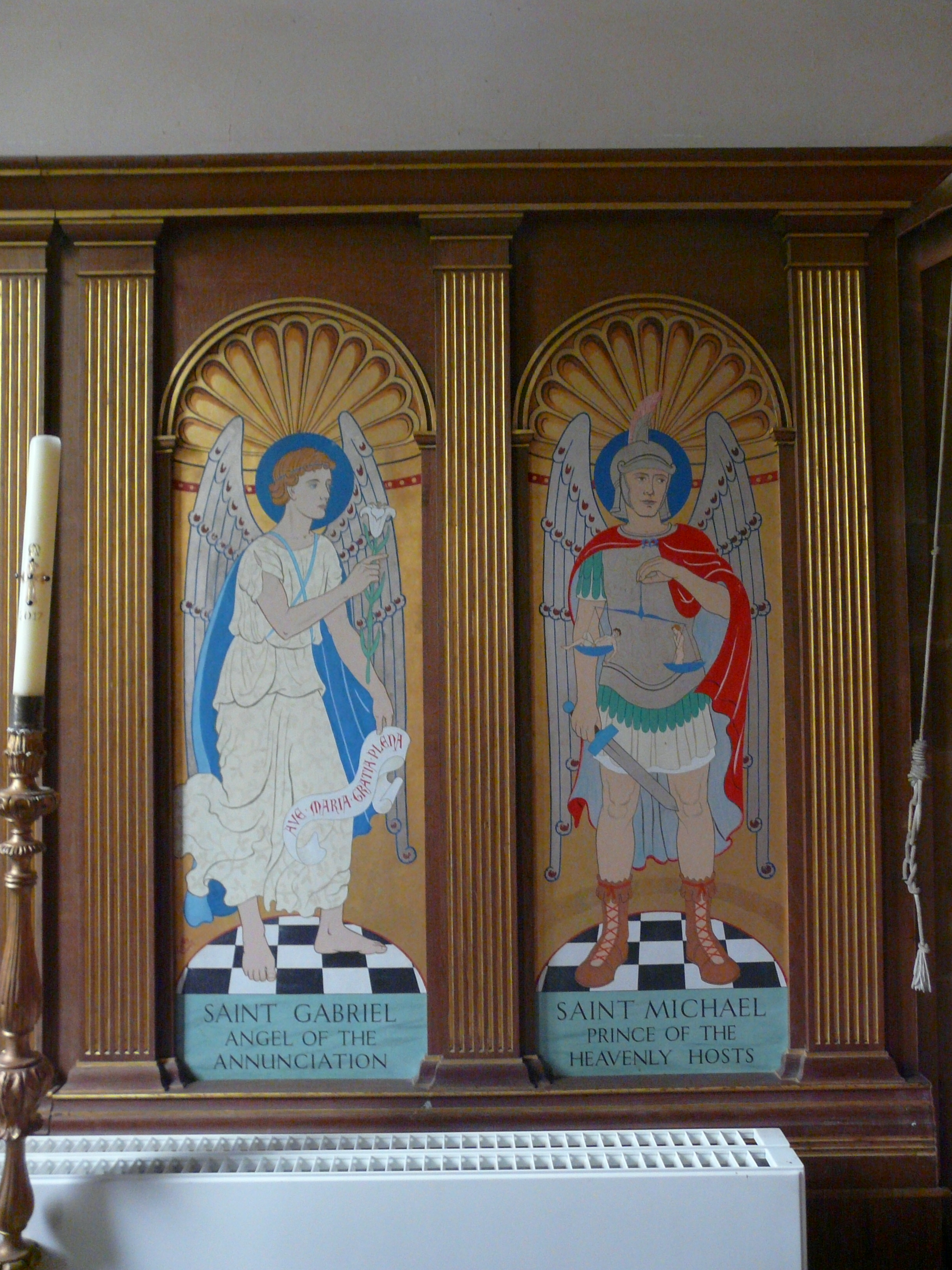
Gabriel, Michael

The Four Archangels, panel paintings, behind the baptismal font.

The parish of Howick dates back to 1158 when a priest named Asket is recorded, but there was a church here long before his time. The original temple was built in Norman style, it was destroyed by a fire in 1746 and was replaced by what the church guide calls 'a curious Ionic temple'. That 'Ionic' building burnt down in turn and was replaced by the present church in 1848, which was designed by the architect FJ Francis. This neo-Norman style temple is a typically Victorian building, with round-arched Romanesque windows and doors. Francis extended the church eastward by the addition of a chancel and vestry, and westward by the bell-cote.

The church is closely related to the Greys of Howick Hall, and many of the members of the Grey family are buried in the churchyard. The most famous and important of them was Charles Grey, 2nd Earl Grey, who served as Prime Minister between 1830 and 1834. It was during his tenure that the Reform Act 1832 was passed, paving the way for representative democracy. But today he is best remembered not for his political achievements, but for the tea that bears his name.

The Greys did more than just go to church. Maria Copley, 3rd Countess Grey (1803–1879), was a sculptor. She carved the gargoyles that decorate the exterior north wall. Mabel Palmer, 5th Countess (1884–1958), commissioned the paintings behind the altar and the baptismal font, and are regarded with mixed feelings.

Michael Fisher, the second Anglican Bishop of St Germans, recounts the experience with the family of Charles Grey, 5th Earl Grey in his memoir For the Time Being: A Memoir, he mentions that they were devout High Church Anglicans, but the churchmanship of St Michael's is unclear.
