= Earl Grey =

Hereditary English title of nobility

- Arms of Earl Grey Blazon Arms: Gules, a lion rampant within a bordure engrailed argent, in dexter chief point a mullet or. Crest: A scaling ladder or, hooked and pointed sable. Supporters: Dexter, a lion guardant purpure, ducally crowned or; sinister, a tiger guardant proper. Motto: De bon vouloir servir le roy (To serve the king with good will).
- Creation date: 11 April 1806
- Created by: King George III
- Peerage: Peerage of the United Kingdom
- First holder: Charles Grey, 1st Baron Grey
- Present holder: Alexander Grey, 8th Earl Grey
- Heir presumptive: Christopher John Grey
- Remainder to: the 1st Earl's heirs male of the body lawfully begotten
- Subsidiary titles: Viscount Howick; Baron Grey of Howick
- Status: Extant
- Former seats: Howick Hall; Fallodon Hall
- Motto: De bon vouloir servir le roy ("To serve the King with good will")

Earl Grey is a title in the peerage of the United Kingdom. It was created in 1806 for General Charles Grey, 1st Baron Grey. In 1801, he was given the title Baron Grey of Howick in the County of Northumberland, and in 1806 he was created Viscount Howick in the County of Northumberland, at the same time as he was given the earldom. A member of the prominent Grey family of Northumberland, Earl Grey was the third son of Sir Henry Grey, 1st Baronet of Howick (see below).

== History ==
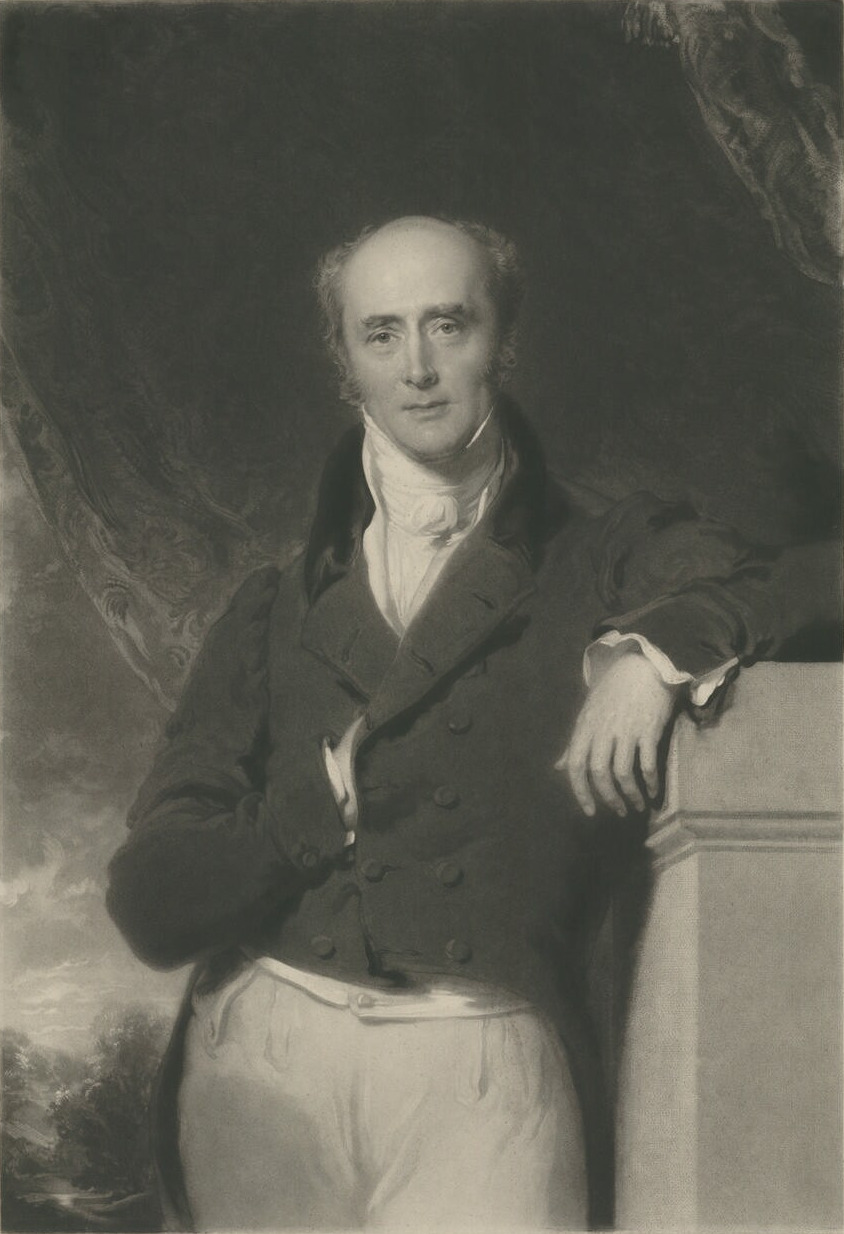
Charles Grey, 2nd Earl Grey

The first Earl Grey was succeeded by his eldest son, Charles, 2nd Earl Grey. The second Earl was a prominent Whig politician and served as Prime Minister of the United Kingdom from 1830 to 1834, which tenure saw the passing of the Reform Act 1832 and the abolition of slavery in the British Empire in 1833. In 1808, he also succeeded his uncle as third Baronet, of Howick.

The second Earl was succeeded by his second (but eldest surviving) son, Henry, 3rd Earl Grey. The third Earl was also a Whig politician and served under Lord John Russell as Secretary of State for War and the Colonies from 1846 to 1852. On his death, the titles passed to his nephew, Albert, 4th Earl Grey, who was the son of General the Hon. Charles Grey, third son of the second Earl. Lord Grey was governor general of Canada between 1904 and 1911. His son, Charles, 5th Earl Grey, was a major in the Army. He died without male issue and was succeeded by his second cousin once removed, Richard, 6th Earl Grey. He was the great-great-grandson of Admiral the Hon. George Grey, fourth son of the second earl. The 6th Earl died in September 2013 and was succeeded by his brother Philip, 7th Earl Grey.

The Grey baronetcy, of Howick in the County of Northumberland, was created in the Baronetage of Great Britain in 1746 for Henry Grey, High Sheriff of Northumberland in 1738. A member of an old Northumberland family, he was eighth in descent from Sir Thomas Grey, of Heton, elder brother of John Grey, 1st Earl of Tankerville (see the Earl of Tankerville, 1418 creation), and fifth in descent from Sir Edward Grey, of Howick, uncle of William Grey, 1st Baron Grey of Warke. In 1720 he married Hannah, daughter of Thomas Wood of Fallodon near Alnwick in Northumberland. Grey was succeeded by his eldest son, the second baronet. He represented Northumberland in the House of Commons. He died unmarried and was succeeded by his nephew, the second Earl Grey. For further history of the baronetcy, see above.

Several other members of this branch of the Grey family have gained distinction. The Hon. George Grey (1767–1828), second son of the first Earl Grey, was created a baronet, of Fallodon in the County of Northumberland, in 1814 (see Grey baronets) and was the father of Sir George Grey, 2nd Baronet, and the great-grandfather of Edward Grey, 1st Viscount Grey of Fallodon. The Right Reverend the Hon. Edward Grey (1782–1837), fifth son of the first Earl, was Bishop of Hereford from 1832 to 1837. His fourth son Sir William Grey (1818–1878) served as Governor of Bengal from 1866 to 1871 and as governor of Jamaica from 1874 to 1877. His daughter Sybil Frances Grey (d. 1945) was the mother of Prime Minister Anthony Eden, 1st Earl of Avon. Sir Paul Francis Grey, British Ambassador to Czechoslovakia from 1957 to 1960 and to Switzerland from 1960 to 1964, was the grandson of Francis Douglas Grey, a son from the second marriage of the Right Reverend the Hon. Edward Grey, Bishop of Hereford. The aforementioned the Hon. Charles Grey, third son of the second Earl, was a general in the Army. The aforementioned the Hon. George Grey (1809–1891), fourth son of the second Earl, was an admiral in the Royal Navy.

The family seats were Howick Hall and Fallodon Hall in Northumberland. The traditional burial place of the Earls Grey is St Michael and All Angels Church, Howick.

== Legacy ==
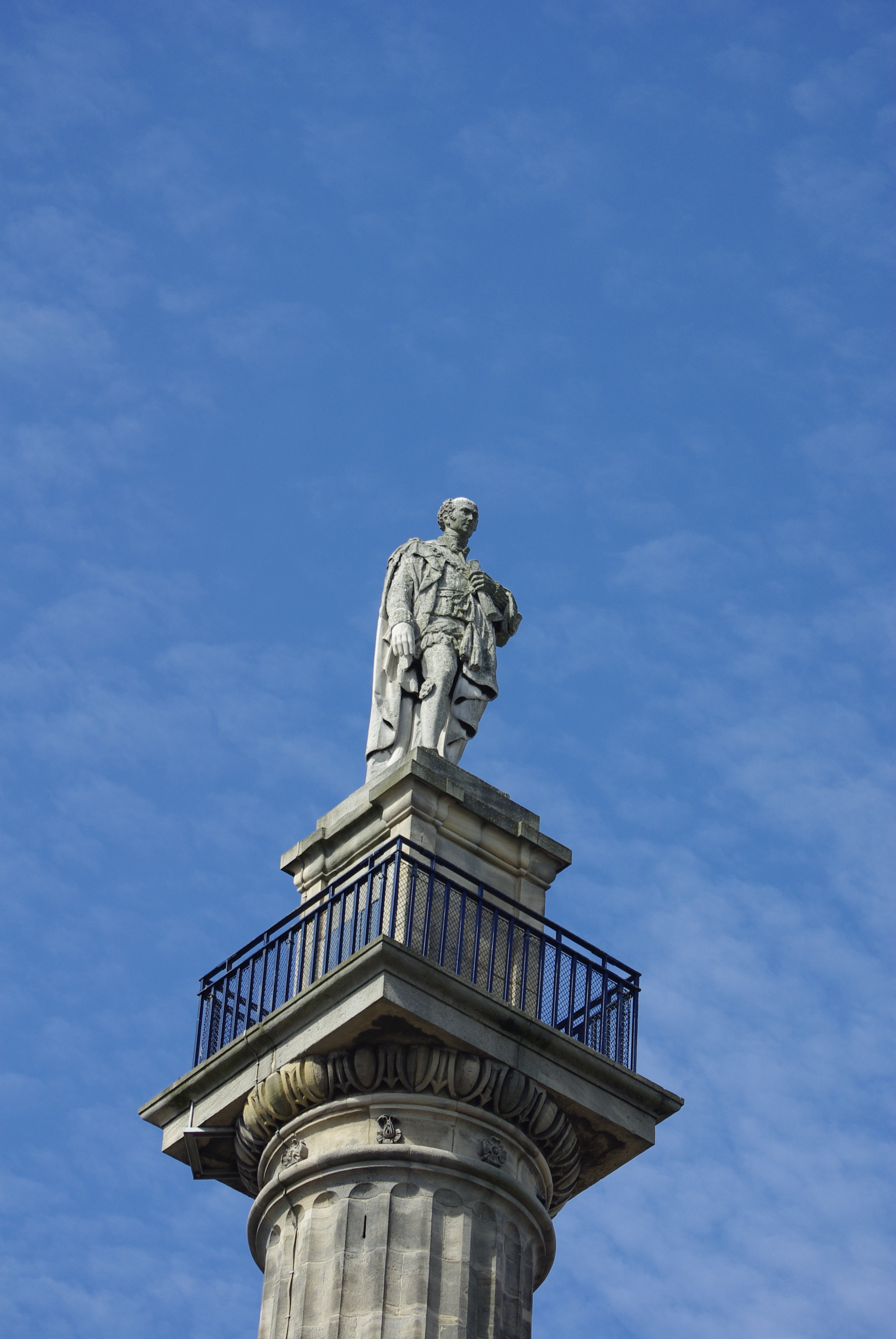
Grey's Monument in Newcastle

Earl Grey tea is named after the second Earl Grey.

Grey College, Durham is named after the second Earl Grey, commemorating his support for the Durham University Act 1832 that established the university during his term as prime minister.

The Grey Cup, the championship trophy for the Canadian Football League, is named after the 4th Earl, in 1909; at the time, Lord Grey was serving as Governor General of Canada.

A column topped with a statue of Charles Grey, 2nd Earl Grey (referred to locally as Grey's Monument), has a prominent location in the city of Newcastle upon Tyne.

Grey County in Ontario, Canada is named after the 2nd Earl Grey.

The Gateshead fiddler James Hill (b. 1811 d. 1856) composed the tune "Earl Gray" in the Scottish Strathspey style, possibly to commemorate the opening of Grey's Monument in 1838. It still remains part of the traditional music repertoire of Scotland and Northumberland.

Earl Grey Street in Edinburgh was named after the 2nd Earl after his visit to the city in 1834.

== Grey baronets, of Howick (1746) ==
Created by George II of Great Britain
#	Name	Period	Spouse	Notes	Other titles
1	Sir Henry Grey, 1st Baronet (1691–1749)	1746–1749			
2	Sir Henry Grey, 2nd Baronet (1722–1808)	1749–1808			
3	Sir Charles Grey, 3rd Baronet (1764–1845)	1808–1845	Mary Grey, Lady Grey	as 2nd Earl Grey, succeeded his uncle as 3rd Baronet.	

== Earls Grey (1806) ==
Created by George III of the United Kingdom
#	Name	Period	Spouse	Notes	Other titles
1	Charles Grey, 1st Earl Grey; KB, PC (1729–1807)	1806–1807	Elizabeth Grey, Countess Grey		Baron Grey (1801); Viscount Howick (1806)
2	Charles Grey, 2nd Earl Grey; KG, PC (1764–1845)	1807–1845	Mary Grey, Countess Grey	Prime Minister of the United Kingdom from 1830 to 1834	Viscount Howick; Baron Grey; Baronet
3	Henry George Grey, 3rd Earl Grey; KG, GCMG, PC (1802–1894)	1845–1894	Maria Copley, Countess Grey		Viscount Howick; Baron Grey; Baronet
4	Albert Henry George Grey, 4th Earl Grey; GCB, GCMG, GCVO, PC (1851–1917)	1894–1917	Alice Holford, Countess Grey	Governor General of Canada from 1904 to 1911; the Grey Cup is named after him	Viscount Howick; Baron Grey; Baronet
5	Charles Robert Grey, 5th Earl Grey; DL (1879–1963)	1917–1963	Mabel Palmer, Countess Grey, CBE		Viscount Howick; Baron Grey; Baronet
6	Richard Fleming George Charles Grey, 6th Earl Grey (1939–2013)	1963–2013	Margaret Ann Bradford, Countess Grey (1966–1974); Stephanie Caroline, Countess Grey (1974–2013)		Viscount Howick; Baron Grey; Baronet
7	Philip Kent Grey, 7th Earl Grey (1940–2023)	2013–2023	Ann Catherine Applegate, Countess Grey		Viscount Howick; Baron Grey; Baronet
8	Alexander Edward Grey, 8th Earl Grey (born 1968)	2023–present			Viscount Howick; Baron Grey; Baronet

== Present peer ==
Alexander Edward Grey, 8th Earl Grey (born 20 December 1968) is the son of Philip Kent Grey, 7th Earl Grey and his wife Ann Catherine Applegate. In October 1995, he married Ursula C. Boult, and they have a daughter, Lady Alice Ursula Grey, born 1996. The heir presumptive is Christopher John Grey (born 1946), a first cousin of the present Earl's father.

== Line of succession ==
Line of succession (simplified)
- Charles Grey, 1st Earl Grey (1729–1807)
  - Charles Grey, 2nd Earl Grey (1764–1845)
    - Henry Grey, 3rd Earl Grey (1802–1894)
    - General Hon. Charles Grey (1804–1870)
      - Albert Grey, 4th Earl Grey (1851–1917)
        - Charles Grey, 5th Earl Grey (1879–1963)
    - Admiral Hon. George Grey (1809–1891)
      - Francis William Grey (1860–1939)
        - George Archibald Grey (1886–1952)
          - Albert Harry Grey (1912–1942)
            - Richard Grey, 6th Earl Grey (1939–2013)
            - Philip Kent Grey, 7th Earl Grey (1940–2023)
              - Alexander Grey, 8th Earl Grey (born 1968)
          - Rodney York de Charmoy Grey (1921–2017)
            - (1). Christopher John Grey (born 1946)
              - (2). Duncan Colin Grey (born 1974)
            - (3). David York Grey (born 1947)
              - (4). Michael Colin Grey (born 1982)
                - (5). Charles David Grey (born 2017)
            - (6). Simon Alexander Grey (born 1958)
            - (7). Marcus Edward Grey (born 1960)
  - Sir George Grey, 1st Baronet (1767–1828)
    - Charles Samuel Grey (1811–1860)
      - Edward George Grey (1858–1935)
        - Sir Robin Edward Dysart Grey, 6th Baronet (1886–1974)
          - Edward Elton Grey (1920–1962)
            - (8). Sir Anthony Dysart Grey, 7th Baronet (born 1949)
              - (9). Thomas Jasper Grey (born 1998)
  - Rt. Rev. Hon. Edward Grey (1782–1837)

== See also ==
- Other Grey titles
- Grey Baronets
- Earl of Tankerville
- Baron Grey of Warke
- Earl De Grey (a slightly newer unrelated title for a different family)

Baronetage of Great Britain
Preceded by Beauchamp-Proctor baronets	Grey baronets of Howick; 11 January 1746	Succeeded by Harbord baronets
