= Lalage =

Lalage may refer to:

== Biology ==
- Lalage (bird), the genus of the triller birds
- Lalage, a synonym of the legume genus Bossiaea

== People ==
- Lalage Bown (born 1927), English educator
- Lalage, for whom the Roman poet Horace professes his love in "Integer vitae", a famous poem in Carminum liber primus
- Lalage Mary Kathleen Acland, wife of Sir Hubert Acland, 4th Baronet
- Constance Lalage Thompson, wife of Sir Edward Wakefield, 1st Baronet
- Mary Wakefield (journalist) (Mary Elizabeth Lalage Wakefield), British journalist

== Other uses ==
- Lalage, the main character of Poe's 1835 play Politian
- 822 Lalage, an asteroid
- Lalage, a boat in the 6 Metre sailing event at the 1936 and 1948 Olympics
- Lalage, a common name of courtesans, from the Greek λαλαγή, “prattling,” used as a term of endearment—“little prattler.”
