= Francis William Grey =

English-Canadian novelist (1860–1939)

- Born: 1860
- Died: 1939 (aged 78–79)
- Occupation: Writer; academic

Academic work
- Notable works: The Curé of St. Philippe

Francis William Grey (1860–1939) was a British-born Canadian writer and academic. He was most noted for his 1899 novel The Curé of St. Philippe, which was republished by McClelland and Stewart's New Canadian Library series in 1970.

== Early life and education ==
Born and educated in England, Grey was one of the sons of Admiral George Grey (1809–1891), a younger son of Charles Grey, 2nd Earl Grey.

== Career ==
Grey moved to Canada and became a professor of English at the University of Ottawa, later working for the National Archives of Canada.

== Personal life ==
On 22 December 1885, Grey married Jessie Macleod Rolland, a daughter of Charles Rolland, of Kilmorie House, Ottawa, who was seigneur of Sainte Marie de Manoir, Quebec. He became knowledgeable about French Canadian culture, and while The Curé of St. Philippe has been regarded as a weak in terms of storytelling, it is a strong and highly detailed portrait of French Canadian social and cultural organization in its era, depicting a small town in the process of building and launching its own new Roman Catholic church. It was Grey's only novel, although he published academic non-fiction, poetry and theatrical plays.

Grey's son George Archibald Grey (1886–1952) married Margery Campbell, a daughter of the poet William Wilfred Campbell, and their grandsons Richard and Philip Grey inherited the earldom in 1963 and 2013 respectively.
