= Sir Humphry Wakefield, 2nd Baronet =

English baronet and expert on antiques and architecture

Sir Edward Humphry Tyrrell Wakefield 2nd Baronet
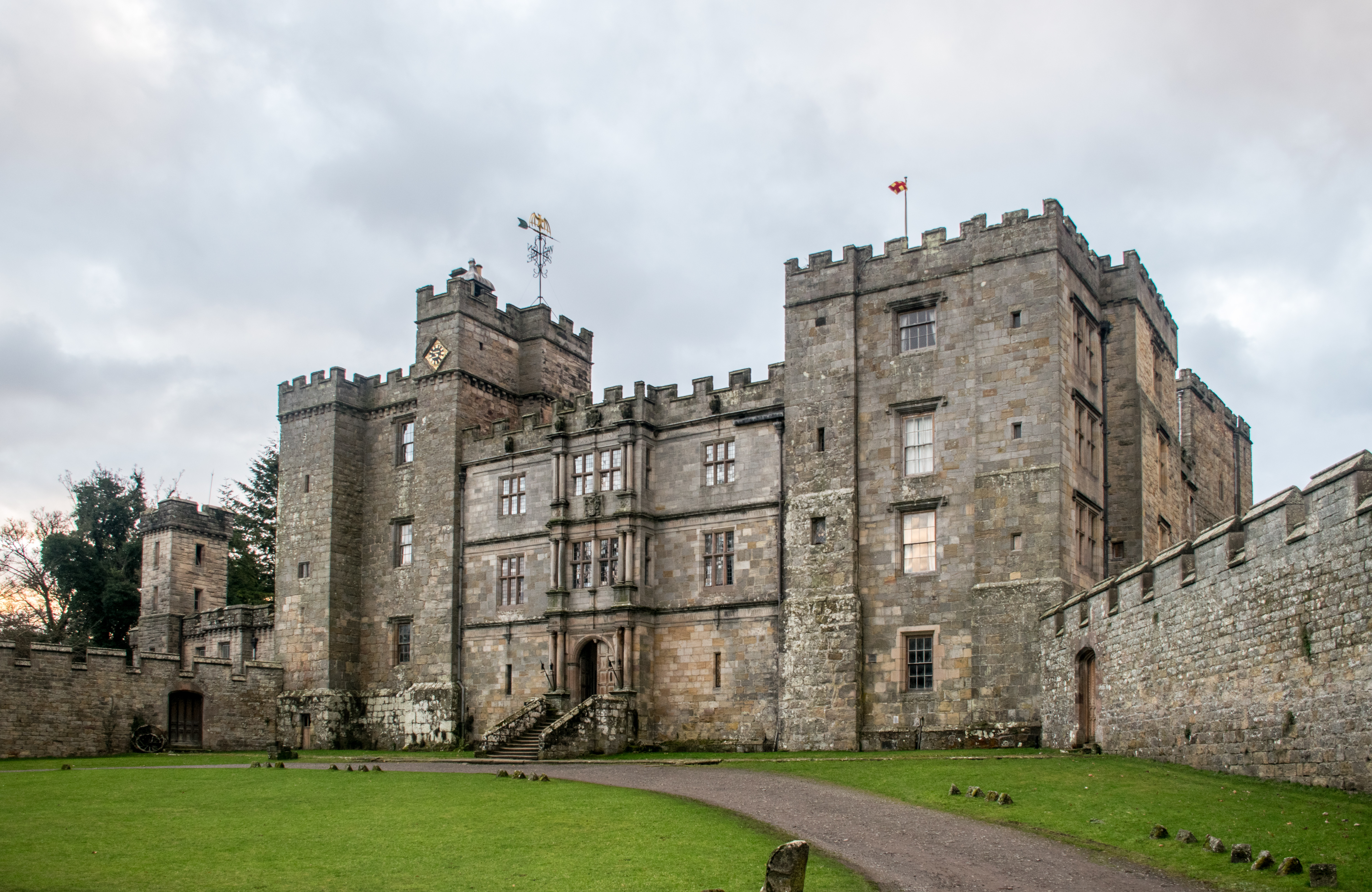
- Wakefield's home, Chillingham Castle
- Born: 11 July 1936 (age 90)
- Residence: Chillingham Castle
- Noble family: Wakefield of Kendal
- Spouses: Priscilla Bagot (m. 1960; div. 1964); Elizabeth Sophia Sidney (m. 1966; div. 1971); Katherine Mary Alice Baring (m. 1974)
- Issue: Maximilian Edward Vereker Wakefield; William Wakefield; Mary Elizabeth Lalage Wakefield; Jack Humphry Baring Wakefield
- Father: Sir Edward Wakefield, 1st Baronet
- Mother: Constance Lalage Perronet Thompson
- Occupation: Antiques dealer

Sir Edward Humphry Tyrrell Wakefield, 2nd Baronet, FRGS (born 11 July 1936) is an English baronet and expert on antiques and architecture.

Wakefield has made his career a study of antique furniture and historic restoration. He worked for Christie's of London, and subsequently became director and chairman of antique-dealing firms.

In 1982 he bought Chillingham Castle, Northumberland, from the Grey family of Northumberland, the family of his third wife Katherine, daughter of Lady Mary Grey. He has since restored the ruined castle to a habitable state to house a wide collection of antiquities.

== Early life ==
Wakefield is the elder son of the politician Sir Edward Wakefield, a nephew of the 1st Baron Wakefield of Kendal, and Constance Lalage Thompson, the second child of Sir John Perronet Thompson. He was educated at Gordonstoun School and Trinity College, Cambridge, where he graduated with an MA.

== Career ==
After leaving Cambridge, Wakefield was commissioned into the 10th Royal Hussars and retired from the army with the rank of captain. He was a director of Mallett & Son (Antiques) Ltd, from 1971 to 1978 and executive vice-president of Mallett America Ltd. from 1970 to 1975. He was then chairman of Tyrrell & Moore Ltd from 1978 to 1992. He joined the New Zealand Everest Team in 1990 and was a member of Norman D. Vaughan's Antarctic Expedition of 1993.

He has been a director of the Tree of Life Foundation since 1976 and patron of The Wilderness Foundation since 1999. He is also president of the Northumberland National Park Mountain Rescue Team, the Avison Trust, and the Tibetan Spaniel Association. He was a director of the Spoleto Festival of the Two Worlds (United States and Italy) from 1973 to 1980 and is a fellow of the Pierpont Morgan Library and the Royal Geographical Society. He is a life member of the Scott Polar Institute and the Harlequin Football Club (Rugby).

He is also a member of the Standing Council of the Baronetage and of the Society of Dilettanti. He belongs to the Beefsteak, Cavalry and Guards, and Turf Clubs.

Wakefield, whose father-in-law, Lord Howick, acted as Governor of Kenya during the Mau Mau crisis, owns a horse called Barack, named after the half-Kenyan American President Barack Obama, 'because the horse is half black and half white'. Wakefield has professed an interest in eugenics. He has stated that "in general, to be elitist, I think the quality climbs up the tree of life. In general, high things in the tree of life have quality, have skills, and they get wonderful degrees at university. And they marry each other and that gets them better again. Intelligence and talent is lovely. But I want parents and grandparents who've had hands-on success, running their battles well, and proving they're wonderful. Because one is the subject of one's genes, and I like the idea of them being successful genes, and winning through to successful puppies".

== Marriages and children ==
Wakefield's first wife was Priscilla Bagot (b. 1939), eldest daughter of Oliver Robin Gaskell, later Bagot (himself nephew and heir of Sir Alan Desmond Bagot, 1st and last Baronet, and Annette Dorothy Stephens), whom he married on 17 September 1960 and divorced in 1964. There were no children of this marriage.

He married, for a second time, on 1 July 1966 (divorced 1971) Hon. Elizabeth Sophia Sidney (b. 12 March 1941) daughter of the 1st Viscount De L'Isle, V.C., K.G. and former wife of George Silver Oliver Annesley Colthurst (by whom one daughter, now wife of the 9th Baron Latymer). They had one son, the present heir apparent to the baronetcy.

In December 1974 Wakefield married, for a third time, the Hon. Katherine Mary Alice Baring (b. 30 March 1936), elder daughter of the 1st Baron Howick of Glendale and his wife Lady Mary Cecil Grey (died 2002), elder daughter of the 5th Earl Grey. They have one son and one daughter; another son died shortly after birth.

Children

- Captain Maximilian Edward Vereker Wakefield (born 22 February 1967), a racing driver, married 1994 Lucinda Katharine Elizabeth Pipe, a daughter of Lt-Colonel and Mrs David Pipe, and has two children
  - William Wavell Wakefield (born 1998)
  - Edward 'Zed' Gort Wakefield (born 2000)
- William Wakefield (born & died 1975)
- Mary Elizabeth Lalage Wakefield (born 1975), married December 2011 Dominic Cummings, one son, Alexander Cedd
- Jack Humphry Baring Wakefield (born 1977), former director of the Firtash Foundation

The heir apparent is Wakefield's eldest son, Maximilian.

== Arms ==
Coat of arms of Sir Humphry Wakefield, 2nd Baronet
Crest A bat displayed proper charged on each wing with a crescent argent. Escutcheon Argent two barrulets sable between three owls proper. Motto Be Just And Fear Not

== Notes ==
Baronetage of the United Kingdom
Preceded by Edward Wakefield	Baronet (of Kendal); 1969–present	Incumbent
