= Mary Wakefield (journalist) =

British journalist and fiction writer (born 1975)

- Born: Mary Elizabeth Lalage Wakefield; 12 April 1975 (age 51); Westminster, London, England
- Education: Wycombe Abbey; University of Edinburgh (MA)
- Occupation: Journalist
- Employer: The Spectator
- Spouse: Dominic Cummings (m. 2011)
- Children: 1
- Father: Humphry Wakefield
- Website: spectator.co.uk/writer/mary-wakefield

Mary Elizabeth Lalage Wakefield (born 12 April 1975) is a British journalist who is a columnist and commissioning editor for The Spectator.

== Early life ==
Wakefield is the daughter of the antique and architectural expert Sir Humphry Wakefield, 2nd Baronet and the Hon. Katherine Mary Alice, daughter of Evelyn Baring, 1st Baron Howick of Glendale, a colonial administrator in Africa, a younger son of Evelyn Baring, 1st Earl of Cromer. She has two brothers; Maximilian Wakefield (born 1967), an entrepreneur and racing car driver, and Jack Wakefield (born 1977), former director of the Firtash Foundation and an art critic who writes for The Spectator and other publications. A third brother, William Wakefield, was born in 1975 and died in infancy.

Wakefield was educated at the independent girls' boarding school Wycombe Abbey and at the University of Edinburgh (MA).

== Career ==
Wakefield has worked at the weekly magazine The Spectator for twenty years, since Boris Johnson was editor, and was commissioning editor in 2017, assistant editor from 2001 and then deputy editor. She also writes for the magazine as a columnist, and has written for The Sun, Daily Mail, The Telegraph and The Times.

In 2015, following an online petition, Wakefield apologised and amended an article she had written for The Spectator in which she described an 18-year-old who had recently died in a moped crash as a "thuggish white lad".

== Personal life ==
In December 2011, Wakefield married Dominic Cummings, a friend of her brother Jack Wakefield. In 2016, they had a son, (Alexander) Cedd, named after an Anglo-Saxon saint.

She is a convert to Catholicism, having been raised in the Anglican tradition. Wakefield was portrayed by Liz White in the 2019 Channel 4 drama Brexit: The Uncivil War.

=== COVID-19 ===
On 25 April 2020, Wakefield wrote an article for The Spectator about her experience when both she and Cummings contracted COVID-19. On 22 May it was reported that Wakefield and Cummings had driven over 260 miles (c. 420 km) each way between London and Durham in late March to stay in a cottage at her father-in-law's farm, while both, reportedly, were exhibiting COVID-19 symptoms, although Cummings states that his symptoms appeared the day after the journey was made.

An eyewitness saw Wakefield on 12 April walking in Barnard Castle in the company of Cummings and their son, after a complaint to the Durham Constabulary by another witness who claimed to have seen Cummings with a group of people in the same town. Cummings admitted that he made the 52-mile round trip with his wife and child to see whether he could drive safely, saying, "My wife was very worried, particularly given my eyesight seemed to have been affected by the disease. She did not want to risk a nearly 300-mile drive with our child [back to London], given how ill I had been."

Following an investigation into these reports, Durham Constabulary stated that, whereas the trip to Barnard Castle might have been a minor breach of the lockdown regulations, the trip to Durham itself was not. Durham Constabulary stated they would take no further action in the matter. Alleged inconsistencies between Cummings's account and his wife's were discussed in the press, and reported to the Independent Press Standards Organisation, the magazine's regulator. IPSO decided not to investigate.
