= 822 Lalage =

Background asteroid

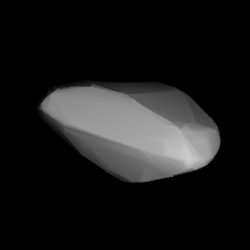
- Modelled shape of Lalage from its lightcurve

Discovery
- Discovered by: M. F. Wolf
- Discovery site: Heidelberg Obs.
- Discovery date: 31 March 1916

Designations
- Pronunciation: /ˈlælədʒiː/
- Named after: unknown Lalage
- Alternative designations: A916 GJ · 1943 EJ_{1} 1916 ZD
- Minor planet category: main-belt · (inner); background

Orbital characteristics
- Epoch 31 May 2020 (JD 2459000.5)
- Uncertainty parameter 0
- Observation arc: 103.84 yr (37,929 d)
- Aphelion: 2.6064 AU
- Perihelion: 1.9043 AU
- Semi-major axis: 2.2554 AU
- Eccentricity: 0.1556
- Orbital period (sidereal): 3.39 yr (1,237 d)
- Mean anomaly: 342.25°
- Mean motion: 0° 17^{m} 27.6^{s} / day
- Inclination: 0.7172°
- Longitude of ascending node: 210.11°
- Argument of perihelion: 247.21°

Physical characteristics
- Mean diameter: 8.243±0.336 km; 11.34±0.28 km
- Synodic rotation period: 3.345±0.001 h
- Pole ecliptic latitude: (343.0°, −74.0°) (λ_{1}/β_{1}); (133.0°, −75.0°) (λ_{2}/β_{2})
- Geometric albedo: 0.187±0.010; 0.349±0.045
- Spectral type: Tholen = DXCU; A (S3OS2-TH); Sl (S3OS2-BB); B–V = 0.766±0.020
- Absolute magnitude (H): 12.1

822 Lalage (prov. designation: A916 GJ or 1916 ZD) is a background asteroid from the inner regions of the asteroid belt. It was discovered on 31 March 1916, by astronomer Max Wolf at the Heidelberg-Königstuhl State Observatory in southwest Germany. The likely highly elongated asteroid with an unclear spectral type has a short rotation period of 3.3 hours and measures approximately 9 kilometers (5.6 miles) in diameter. Any reference to the origin of the asteroid's name is unknown.

== Orbit and classification ==
Lalage is a non-family asteroid of the main belt's background population when applying the hierarchical clustering method to its proper orbital elements. It orbits the Sun in the inner main-belt at a distance of 1.9–2.6 AU once every 3 years and 5 months (1,237 days; semi-major axis of 2.26 AU). Its orbit has an eccentricity of 0.16 and an inclination of 1° with respect to the ecliptic. The body's observation arc begins at the Bergedorf Observatory on 6 April 1916, one week after its official discovery observation at Heidelberg.

== Naming ==
Any reference of this minor planet's name to a person or occurrence is unknown.

=== Unknown meaning ===
Among the many thousands of named minor planets, Lalage is one of 120 asteroids for which no official naming citation has been published. All of these asteroids have low numbers, the first one being 164 Eva. The last asteroid with a name of unknown meaning is 1514 Ricouxa. They were discovered between 1876 and the 1930s, predominantly by astronomers Auguste Charlois, Johann Palisa, Max Wolf and Karl Reinmuth.

== Physical characteristics ==
In the Tholen classification, Lalage has an unusual spectrum, that is closest to a dark D-type, somewhat similar to an X-type, and, to a lesser extent, a carbonaceous C-type asteroid. Conversely, the Small Solar System Objects Spectroscopic Survey (S3OS2), classifies the body an uncommon A-type in the survey's Tholen-like taxonomic variant, and as an Sl-subtype – which transitions from the stony S-type to the uncommon L-type asteroid – in its SMASS-like variant.

=== Rotation period ===
In September 1992, a rotational lightcurve of Lalage was obtained from photometric observations by Polish astronomer Wiesław Wiśniewski. Lightcurve analysis gave a short rotation period of 3.345±0.001 hours with a high brightness variation of 0.47±0.02 magnitude, indicative of a non-spherical, elongated shape (U=3). Since then, additional period determinations gave 3.3465±0.0006 hours with an amplitude of 0.58±0.01 magnitude (U=3) by David Higgins in October 2009, 3.3460±0.0005 hours with an amplitude of 0.67±0.02 magnitude (U=3) by Robert Stephens in January 2014, and 3.346±0.001 hours with an amplitude of 0.53±0.05 magnitude (U=3−) by Daniel A. Klinglesmith in February 2014. A modeled lightcurves using photometric data from the BlueEye600 robotic telescope (L36) at Ondřejov Observatory gave a sidereal period of 3.346503±0.000002. The modelling also gave two poles at (343.0°, −74.0°) and (133.0°, −75.0°) in ecliptic coordinates (λ, β).

=== Diameter and albedo ===
According to the survey carried out by the NEOWISE mission of NASA's Wide-field Infrared Survey Explorer and the Japanese Akari satellite, Lalage measures (8.243±0.336) and (11.34±0.28) kilometers in diameter and its surface has an albedo of (0.349±0.045) and (0.187±0.010), respectively. The Collaborative Asteroid Lightcurve Link assumes an albedo of 0.20 and a diameter of 10.16 kilometers based on an absolute magnitude of 12.33. The WISE team also published an alternative mean-diameter of (8.868±1.502 km) with an albedo of (0.361±0.137).
