= Roger Cuthbert Wakefield =

English rugby union player (1906–1986)

- Born: Roger Cuthbert Wakefield; 27 June 1906 Ulverston, England
- Died: 1 July 1986 (aged 80)
- School: Sedbergh School
- University: Trinity College, Cambridge

Rugby union career
- Position: Forward
Amateur team(s)
Years	Team	Apps	(Points)
1924-1928	Cambridge University		
1927	British Lions - Non Test		
1928	Harlequins		

Roger Cuthbert Wakefield CMG OBE FRICS (27 June 1906 – 1 July 1986) was a rugby player for Cambridge University, Harlequins and British Lions and a surveyor, former Director of the British Sudan Survey Department.

== Early life ==
Wakefield was born at Cark in 1906, the youngest son of Roger William Wakefield, a medical doctor, and Ethel Mary (née Knott). He was the brother of Sir Edward Wakefield, 1st Baronet, a Conservative politician and Wavell Wakefield who played in three England rugby union grand slam winning teams captaining two of them, and later a politician and eventually 1st Baron Wakefield of Kendal.

Like his elder brother, he attended Sedbergh School in the West Riding of Yorkshire (now part of Cumbria). He then attended Trinity College, Cambridge in 1924, graduating in 1928 with a Bachelor of Arts.

== Rugby career ==
At Cambridge he was an occasional player due to the strength of competition but did gain his Blue. He was selected for the 1927 British Lions tour, playing in four games but none of the four internationals. Despite being selected for tour he never went on to play for England. Wakefield also played a number of games for Harlequins in 1928. On 19 April 1928 he and his brother both played in the same team at Barnstable.

== Surveying career ==
Wakefield played a significant part in the history of British survey. In 1929 he was appointed a Senior Inspector of the Survey Department in Khartoum, Sudan. In 1946 he was appointed the Director of the Department, holding the position until his retirement in 1955.

He was appointed Fellow, Royal Institution of Chartered Surveyors in 1949, Order of the British Empire in 1950 and Companion, Order of St. Michael and St. George in 1953.

== Personal life ==
He married Elizabeth Rhoda Davie, born in 1936. They lived at Glendrynoch Lodge, Carbost, Isle of Skye, Scotland, having a daughter Deirdre Eva Preston Wakefield, born on 9 November 1943. She married Commander William Lawrence Tosco Peppé, son of Lt.-Col. William Tosco H. Peppé, on 29 October 1966. Wakefield died on 1 July 1986, aged 80.
