= Charles Baring, 2nd Baron Howick of Glendale =

British baron and arboriculturalist (born 1937)

The Right Honourable The Lord Howick of Glendale

Member of the House of Lords
- Lord Temporal
- as a hereditary peer 10 March 1973 – 11 November 1999
- Preceded by: The 1st Baron Howick of Glendale
- Succeeded by: Seat abolished (Note: Pursuant to the House of Lords Act 1999.)

Personal details
- Born: Charles Evelyn Baring; 30 December 1937 (age 88)
- Party: Crossbench
- Occupation: Peer, arboriculturalist

Charles Evelyn Baring, 2nd Baron Howick of Glendale (born 30 December 1937), is a hereditary peer and a member of the Baring family. He is the son of Evelyn Baring, 1st Baron Howick of Glendale, and is well known as an arboriculturalist and plant collector. He is the creator of the Howick Arboretum at Howick Hall, one of the largest collections of wild origin plants in the United Kingdom. He was educated at Eton College and New College, Oxford.

He served as a director of Barings Bank (1969–1982) and on the executive committee of the National Art Collections Fund. He was a director of Northern Rock plc (1987–2001).

Baring is married to the former Clare Nicolette Darby, (Note: Lady Howick is Chairman of Eventing at the Pony Club.) daughter of Col. Cyril Darby of Kemerton Court. They have four married children, and fourteen grandchildren. His mother Lady Mary Cecil Grey (1907–2002) died aged 94. He inherited Howick Hall on the death of his grandfather Charles Grey, 5th Earl Grey, who broke the entail to avoid passing on the ownership of the estate to his distant cousin the 6th Earl and his heirs.

== Notes ==
Peerage of the United Kingdom
Preceded by Evelyn Baring	Baron Howick of Glendale; 1973–present Member of the House of Lords (1973–1999)	Incumbent; Heir apparent: Hon. David Baring
