= Chillingham Castle =

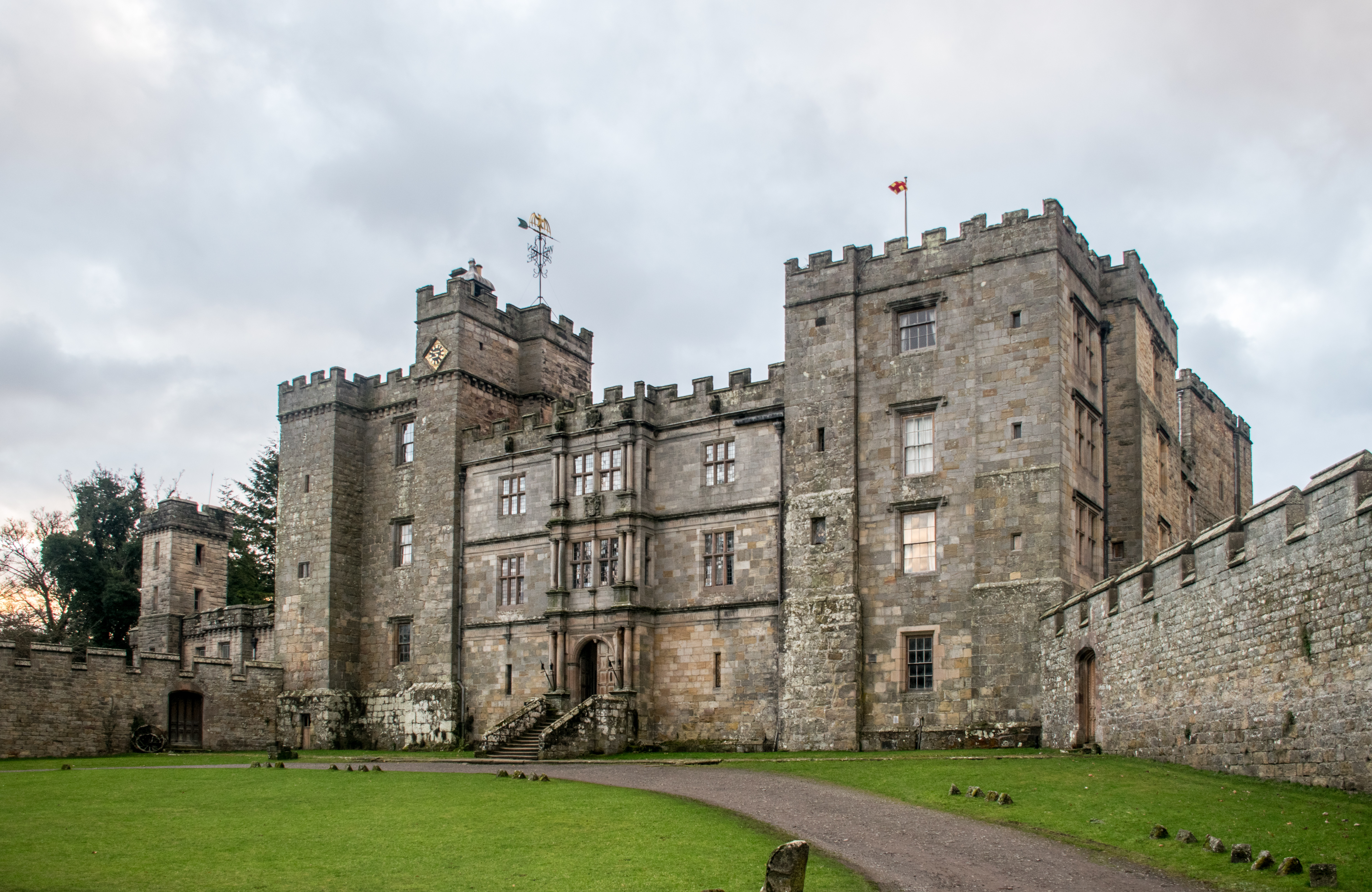
- The north front

- Location within Northumberland

General information
- Type: Castle
- Location: Chillingham, Northumberland, England
- Coordinates: 55.526°N 1.905°W
- Construction started: 12th century
- Owner: Sir Humphry Wakefield, 2nd Baronet

Other information
- Number of suites: 8

Website
- chillingham-castle.com

Chillingham Castle is a medieval castle in the village of Chillingham in the northern part of Northumberland, England. It was the seat of the Grey and Bennet (later Earls of Tankerville) families from the 15th century until the 1980s, when it became the home of Sir Edward Humphry Tyrrell Wakefield, 2nd Baronet, who is married to a member of the original Grey family.

A large enclosed park in the castle grounds is home to the Chillingham cattle, a rare breed, consisting of about 130 head of white cattle.

The castle is a Grade I listed building. In addition to the castle itself, a number of structures on the grounds of the castle are listed Grade II on the National Heritage List for England. These include the West Lodge and gateway, the garden wall to the west, the gateway and garden wall to the north, the gateway and garden wall to the south east, and the garden wall to the west.

A pair of urns in the Italian Garden are also listed Grade II.

== History ==
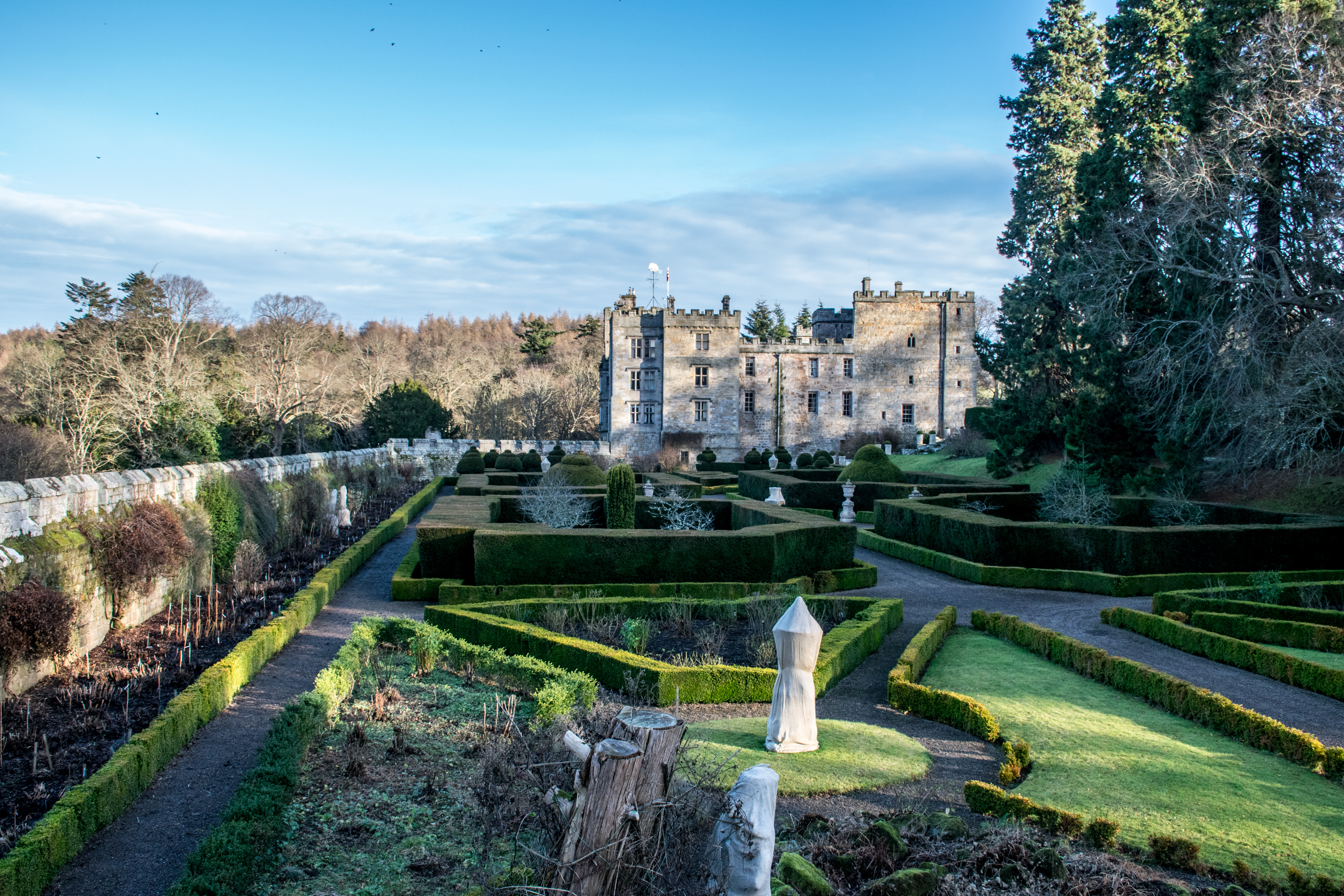
The castle from the east, across its Italian Garden

The castle was originally a monastery in the late 12th century. In 1298, King Edward I stayed at the castle on his way to Scotland to battle a Scottish army led by William Wallace. A glazed window in a frame was specially installed for the king, a rarity in such buildings at the time.

The castle occupied a strategically important location in medieval times: it was located on the border between two feuding nations. It was used as a staging post for English armies entering Scotland, but was also repeatedly attacked and besieged by Scottish armies and raiding parties heading south. The site contained a moat, and in some locations the fortifications were 12 feet (3.7 metres) thick.

The building underwent a harsh series of enhancements, and in 1344 a Licence to crenellate was issued by King Edward III to allow battlements to be built, effectively upgrading the stronghold to a fully fortified castle, of quadrangular form.

At the Union of the Crowns, Anne of Denmark, Queen of Scotland, and her children stayed in the castle on their way to London on 6 June 1603. A poem celebrating her welcome at Chillingham was probably written by her secretary, William Fowler. In 1617, James I, whose reign unified the crowns of England and Scotland (James I of England was also James VI of Scotland), stayed at the castle on a journey between his two kingdoms. As relations between the two countries became peaceful following the union of the crowns, the need for a military stronghold in the area declined. The castle was gradually transformed; the moat was filled, and battlements were converted into residential wings. A banquet hall and a library were built.

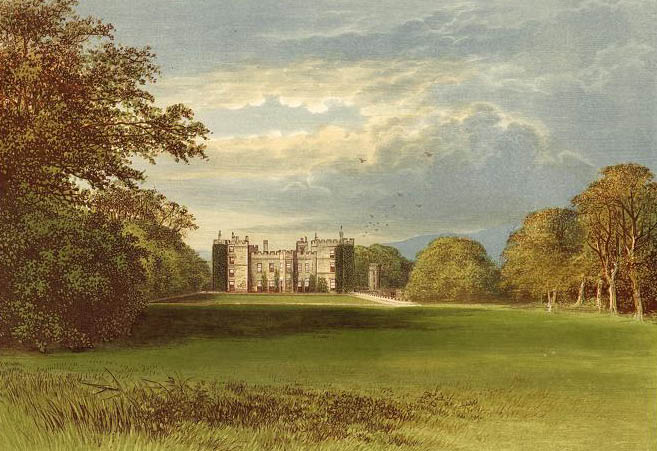
A 19th-century view of the castle from the south

In the 18th and 19th centuries, the grounds underwent landscaping, including work carried out by Sir Jeffry Wyattville. The once extensive park is now under a separate ownership from the castle.

The Prince and Princess of Wales stayed at Chillingham Castle en route to Scotland, in 1872.

During the Second World War, the castle was used as an army barracks. During this time, much of the decorative wood is said to have been stripped out and burned by the soldiers billeted there. After the war, the castle began to fall into disrepair. Lead had been removed from the roof, resulting in extensive weather damage to large parts of the building.

The castle and estate remained linked with the Earls of Tankerville until the 10th Earl of Tankerville succeeded in 1980. Soon after this, the landed estate was broken up and sold.

In 1982, the castle was bought by Sir Humphry Wakefield, 2nd Baronet, whose wife Catherine is descended from the Greys of Chillingham, and Wakefield set about a painstaking restoration of the castle.

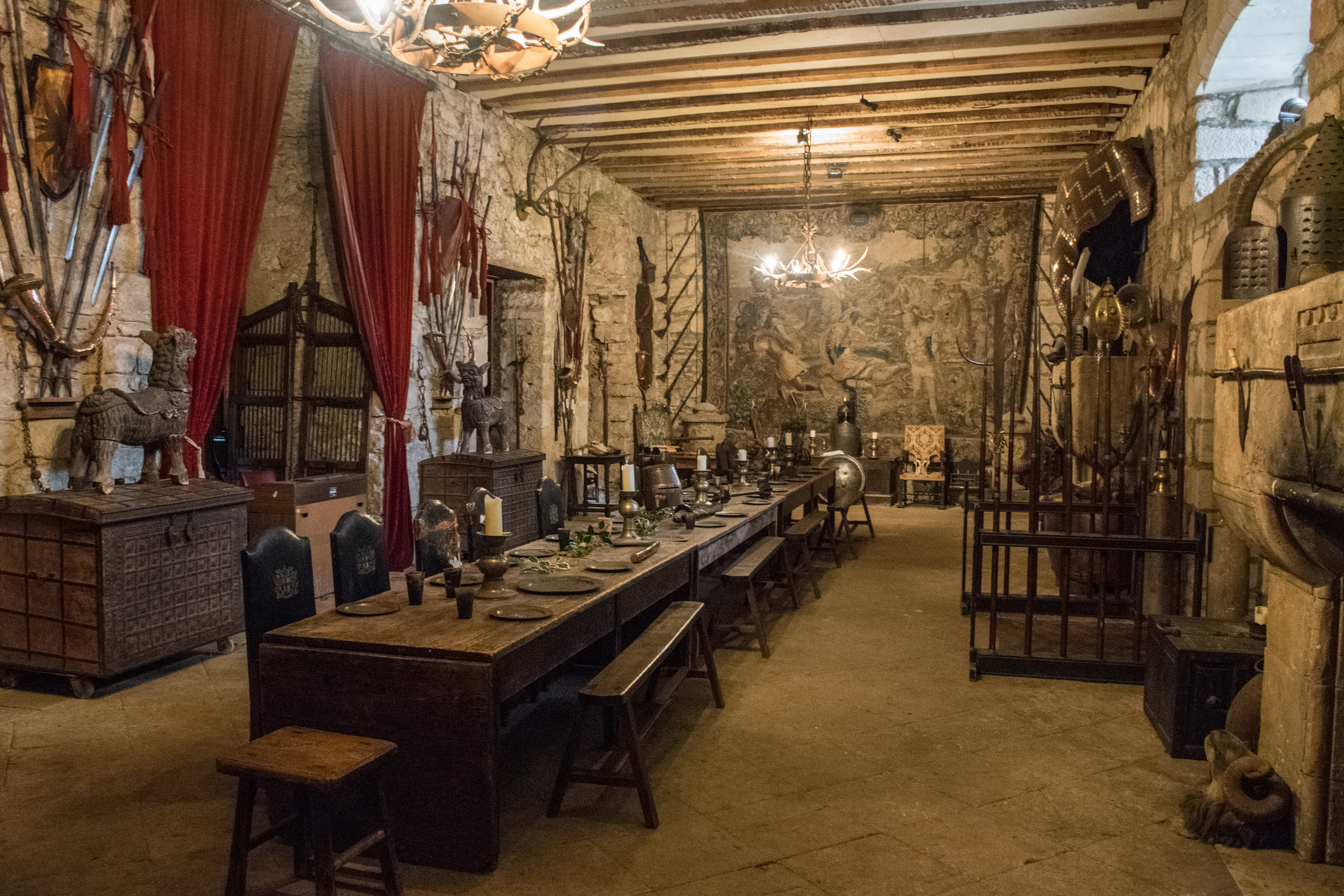
The Great hall, used as a filming location for the 1998 historical film Elizabeth. The medieval-style fireplaces are film props.

In 1997, the castle was used as a filming location for the film Elizabeth, featuring as Leith Castle and as the hunting lodge. The fibreglass fireplaces from the film remain in the great hall, covering 18th-century white marble fireplaces from the demolished Wanstead House in east London.

As of 2020, sections of the castle are open to the public including for late-night ghost tours, and eight apartments within the castle and its outbuildings are available for holiday rentals.

== Chillingham's ghosts ==
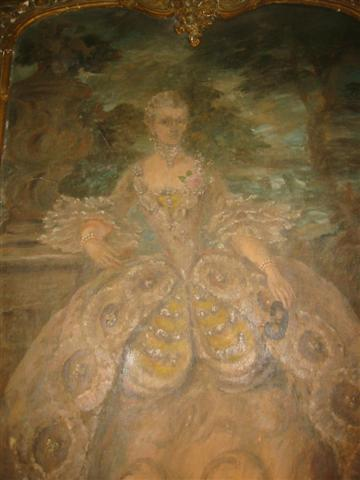
Lady Mary Berkeley – believed to haunt the castle, where her ghost is said to be heard faintly.

The current owners market the castle as being the most haunted castle in Britain. It has been visited by the Most Haunted TV show. The most famous ghost of the castle is the "blue (or radiant) boy", who according to the owners used to haunt the Pink Room in the castle.

In 2024, YouTube paranormal investigators ‘Project Fear’ filmed human bone remains in a box in the dungeon.

Sam and Colby also explored the castle with Daz Black and UK Haunted, Daz investigated the castle twice.

== In literature ==
In the novel The Bride of Lammermoor (1819) by Sir Walter Scott, Chillingham Castle is singled out as a last refuge for an ancient breed of Scottish cattle. The castle and cattle served as inspiration for Eva Ibbotson's 2005 children's book, The Beasts of Clawstone Castle.

Chillingham Castle is the setting for the 2019 murder-mystery novel “Ryan’s Christmas” by LJ Ross.

== Gallery ==
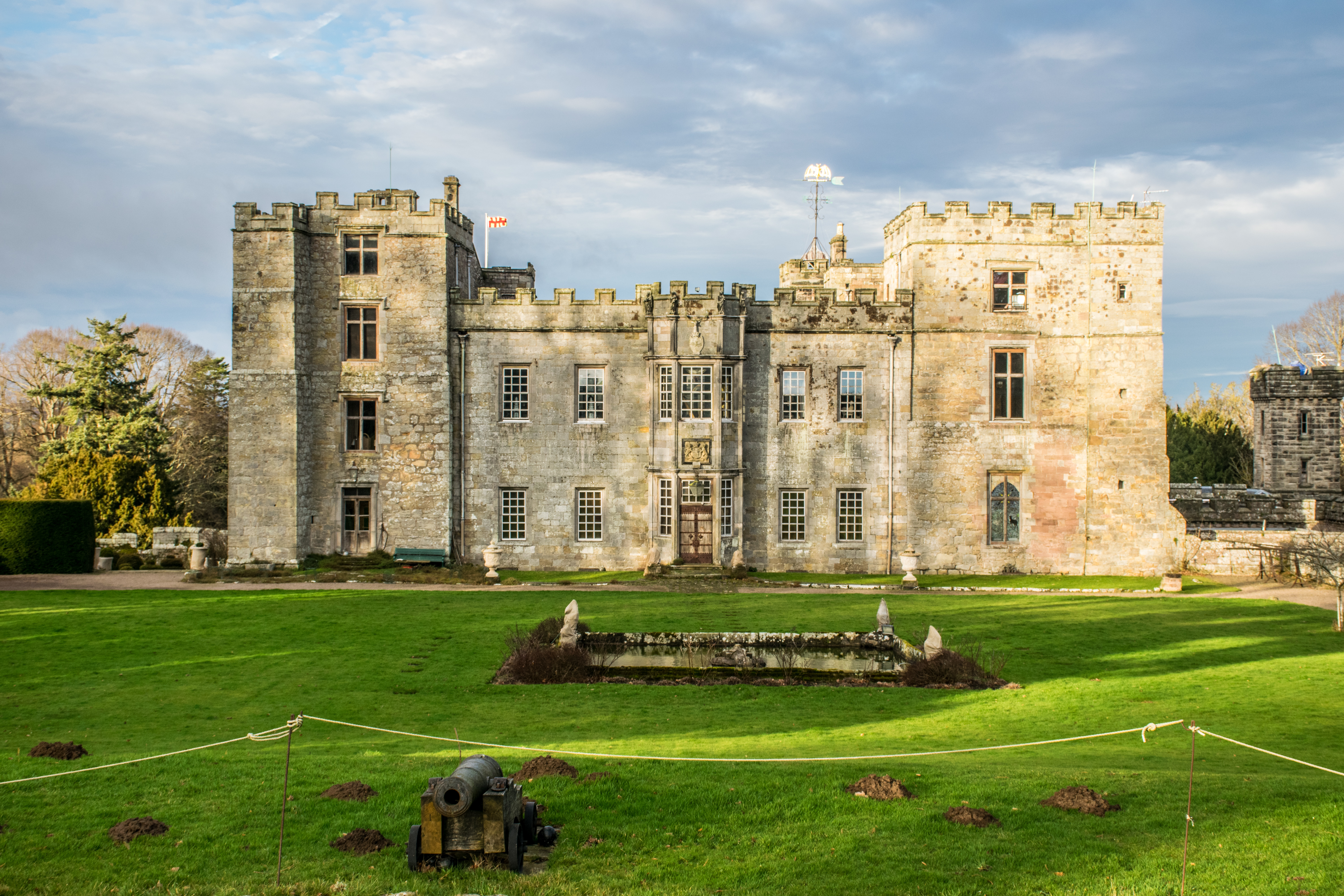
The south front

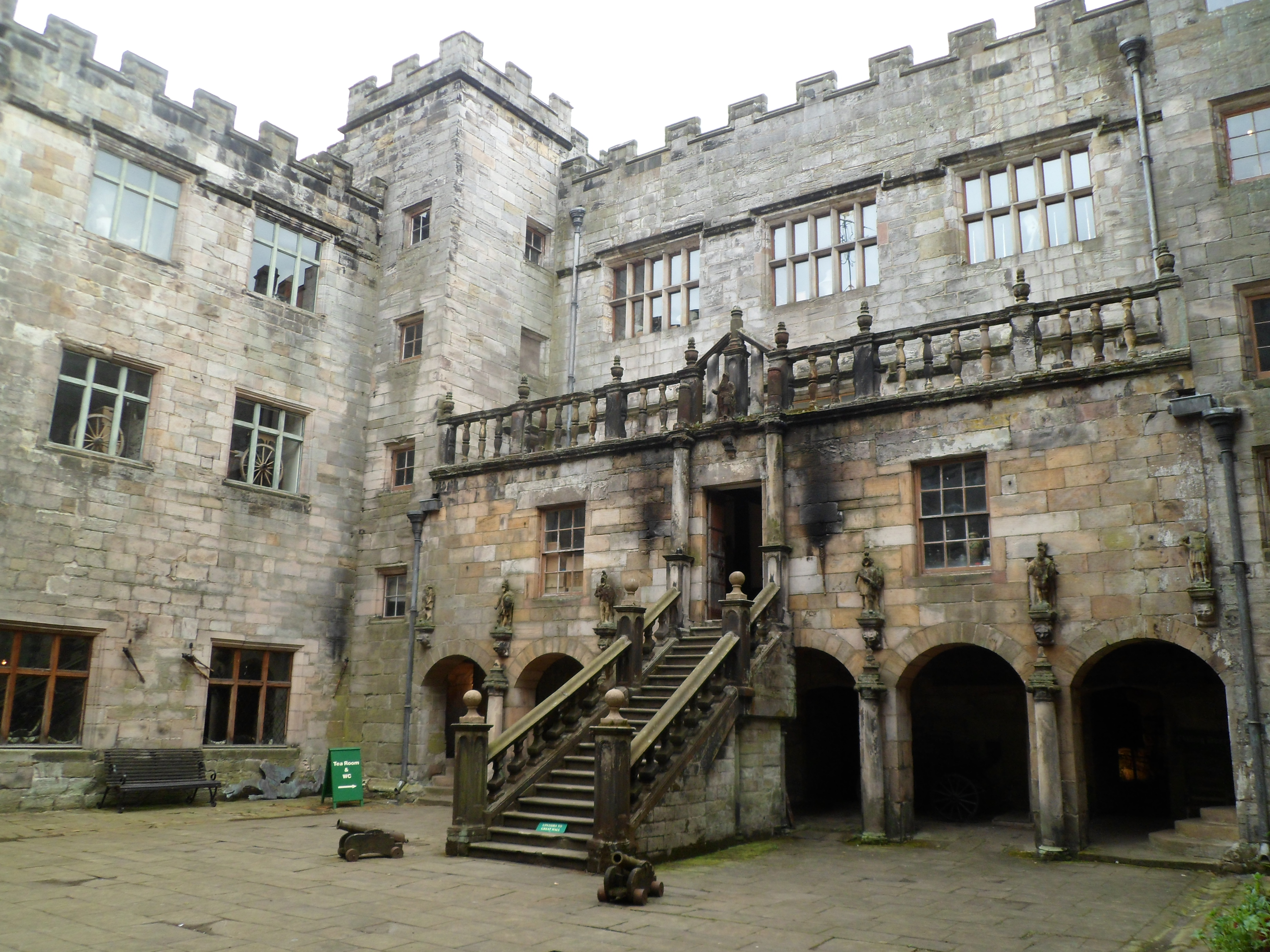
Inside the courtyard

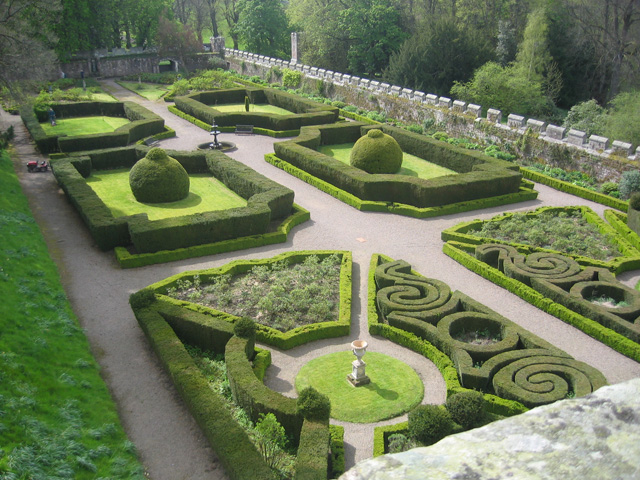
Italian garden from the battlements

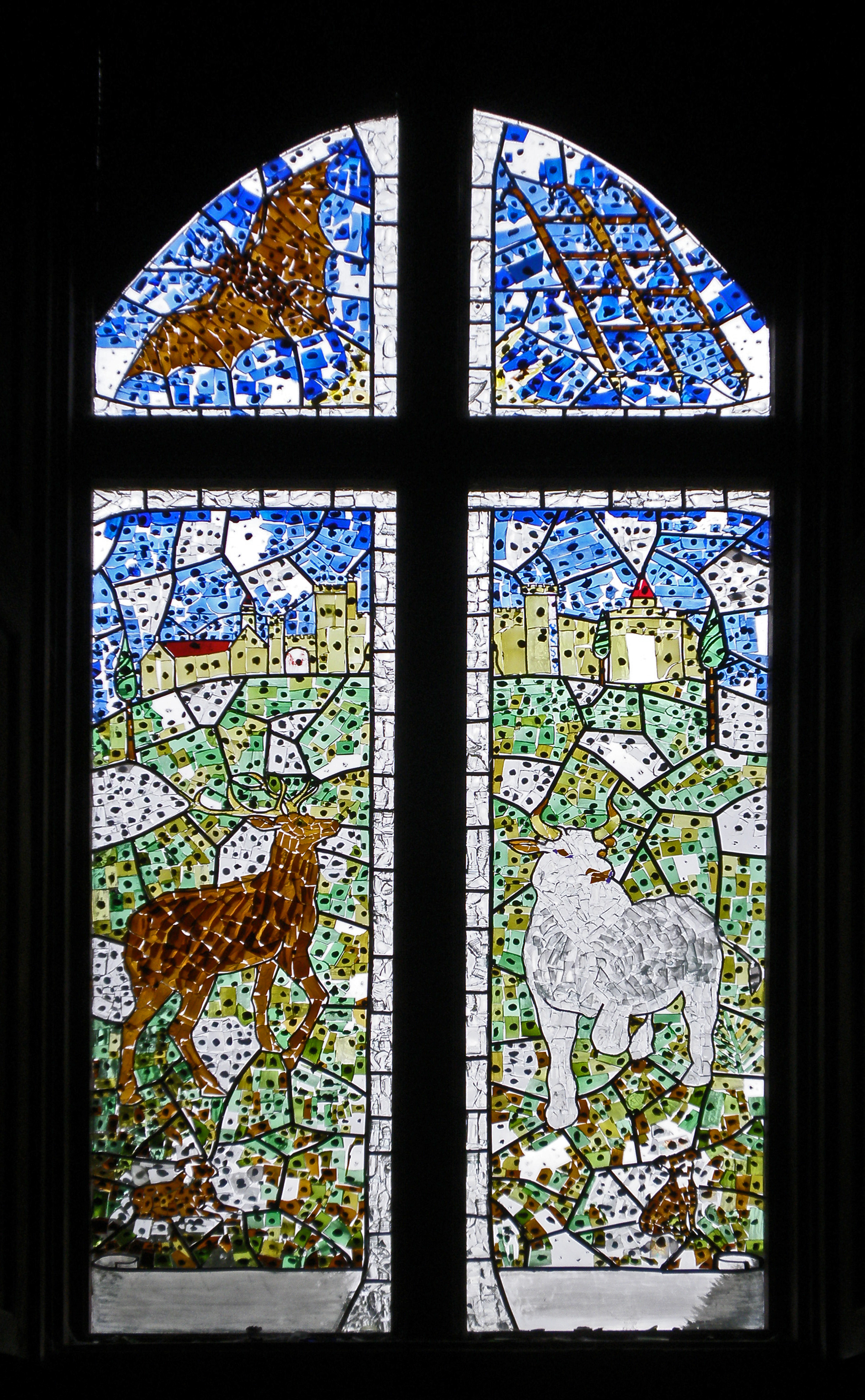
Chapel window

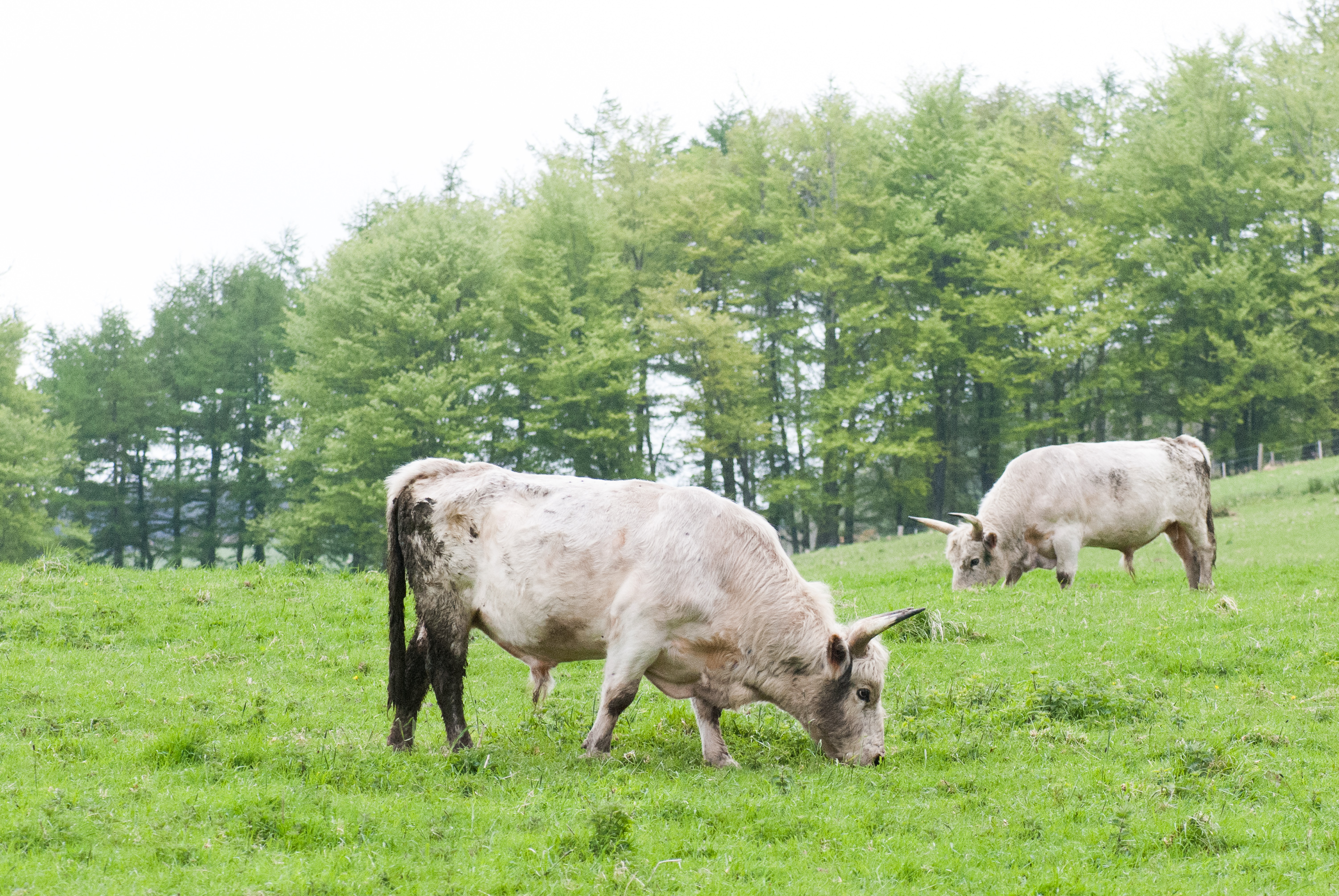
Chillingham cattle

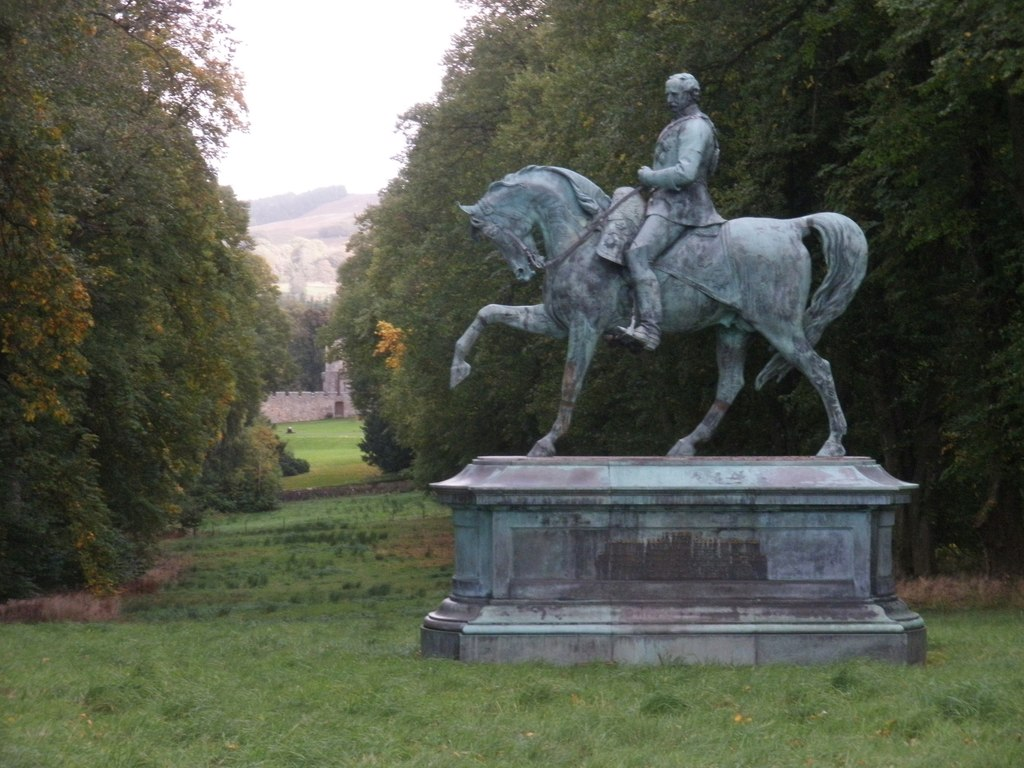
Statue of Viscount Gough, relocated from Dublin

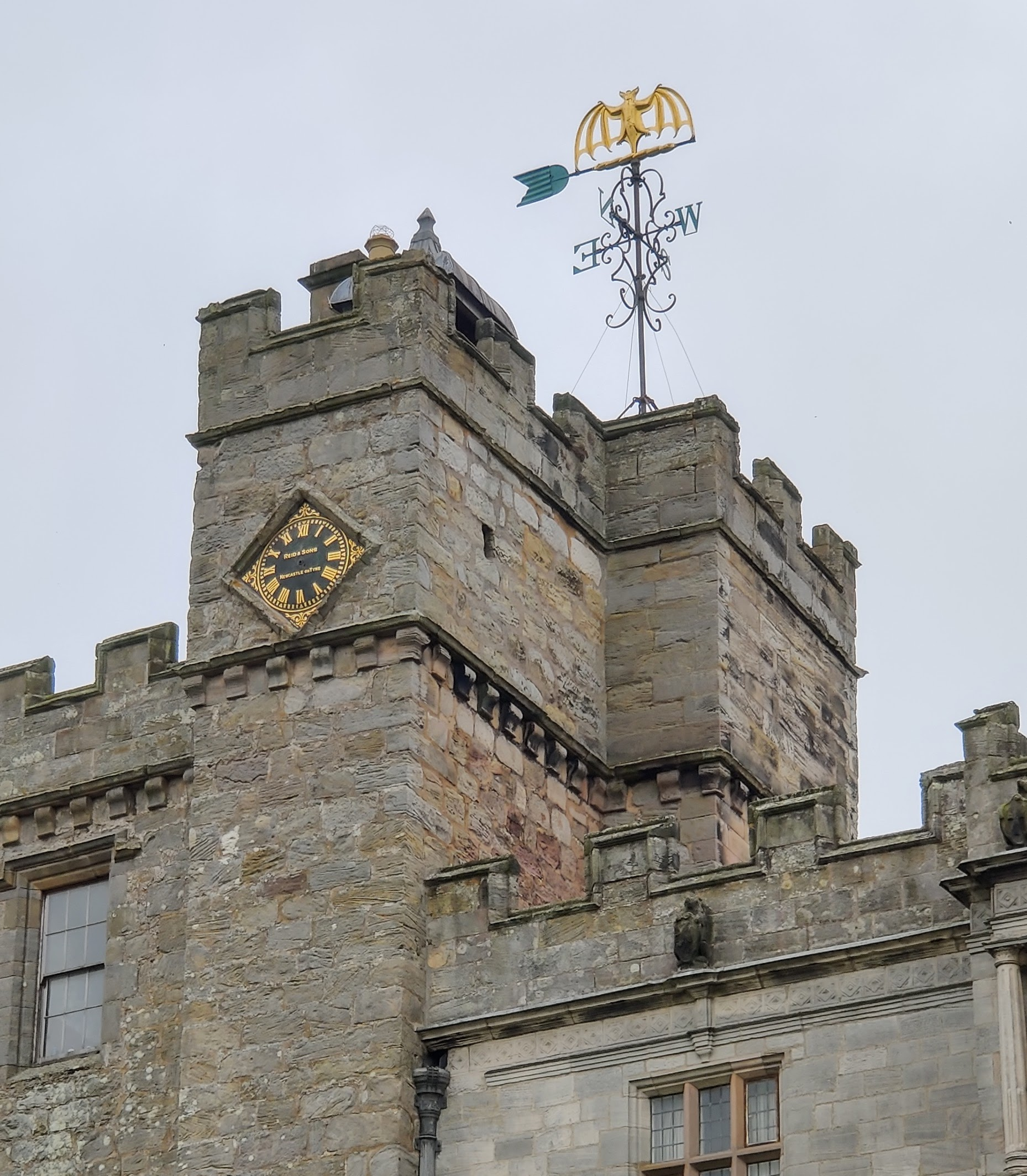
'Bat' weather vane on top of castle

== See also ==
- Castles in Great Britain and Ireland
- List of castles in England
- Chillingham cattle
