= Philip Kent Grey, 7th Earl Grey =

British hereditary peer (1940–2023)

The Right Honourable The Earl Grey
- Born: Philip Kent Grey; 11 May 1940; Watford, Hertfordshire, England
- Died: 5 November 2023 (aged 83); Portsmouth, England
- Spouse: Ann Catherine née Applegate (m. 1968)
- Issue: Alexander Grey, 8th Earl Grey; Lady Vanessa Grey
- Parents: Albert Grey; Vera Harding

Philip Kent Grey, 7th Earl Grey (11 May 1940 – 5 November 2023) was a British naval pilot and hereditary peer.

== Early life ==
Philip Kent Grey was born on 11 May 1940 to Albert Harry George Campbell Grey and Vera Helen Louise Harding. His father, born in Ottawa, Ontario, was serving as a Trooper with the Canadian Armoured Corps when he died at Hove in 1942, of peritonitis, following an accident.

His great-great-grandfather Admiral George Grey (1809–1891) was a younger son of Charles Grey, 2nd Earl Grey, Prime Minister of the United Kingdom. He had an elder brother, Richard, who succeeded to the peerage in 1963, following the death of Charles Grey, 5th Earl Grey, their second cousin twice removed.

== Career ==
Grey served as a Navigating Officer in the Royal Fleet Auxiliary and was also a licensed Trinity House sea pilot and a master mariner.

Philip Grey succeeded his elder brother in 2013, becoming the 7th Earl Grey.

== Personal life ==
In 1964, Grey's mother Vera Grey died at Tavistock, aged 52.

In 1968, Grey married Ann Catherine Applegate, with whom he had two children: Alexander Edward, later 8th Earl Grey (born 20 December 1968) and Lady Vanessa Catherine (born 1975). In 2003, he lived at Valley Cottage, Kingsbridge, Devon.

Lord Grey died in Portsmouth on 5 November 2023, at the age of 83.

== Arms ==
Coat of arms of Philip Kent Grey, 7th Earl Grey
Crest A scaling ladder or, hooked and pointed sable. Escutcheon Gules, a lion rampant, within a bordure engrailed, argent, in dexter chief point a mullet or. Supporters Dexter, a lion guardant purpure, ducally crowned or; sinister, a tiger guardant, proper. Motto De bon vouloir servir le roy (To serve the king with good will).

Peerage of the United Kingdom
Preceded by Richard Fleming Grey	Earl Grey; 2013–2023	Succeeded by Alexander Edward Grey
