= Wakefield baronets =

Baronetcy in the Baronetage of the United Kingdom

There have been two baronetcies created for persons with the surname Wakefield, both in the Baronetage of the United Kingdom. One creation is extinct while one is still extant.

The Wakefield Baronetcy, of Saltwood in the County of Kent, was created in the Baronetage of the United Kingdom on 16 February 1917 for the businessman and philanthropist Charles Wakefield. He was later elevated to the peerage as Viscount Wakefield. For more information, see this title.

The Wakefield Baronetcy, of Kendal in the County of Westmorland, was created in the Baronetage of the United Kingdom on 10 March 1962 for the civil servant and Conservative politician Edward Wakefield. He was the younger brother of Wavell Wakefield, 1st Baron Wakefield of Kendal. As of 2007 the title is held by the first Baronet's son, the second Baronet, who succeeded in 1969.

== Wakefield baronets, of Saltwood (1917) ==
- see the Viscount Wakefield

== Wakefield baronets, of Kendal (1962) ==
- Sir Edward Birkbeck Wakefield, 1st Baronet (1903–1969)
- Sir (Edward) Humphry Tyrrell Wakefield, 2nd Baronet (born 1936)

The heir apparent is the present holder's son Maximilian Edward Vereker Wakefield (born 1967). His heir-in-line is his eldest son William Wavell Wakefield (born 1998).

Coat of arms of Wakefield baronets
Crest A bat displayed proper charged on each wing with a crescent argent. Escutcheon Argent two barrulets sable between three owls proper. Motto Be Just And Fear Not
