= William Wilfred Campbell =

Canadian poet (1850–1918)

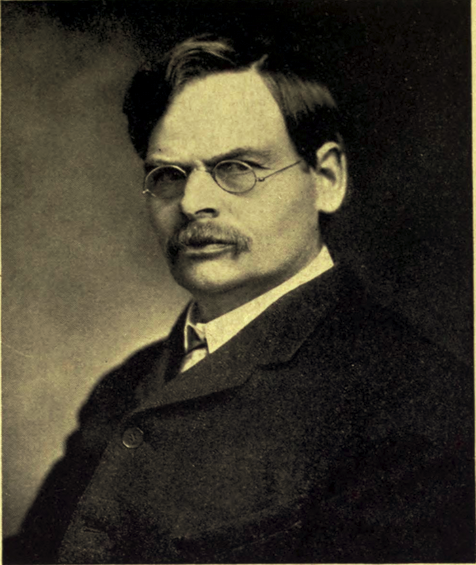
- Born: 1 June 1860; Berlin, Canada West
- Died: 1 January 1918 (aged 57); Ottawa, Ontario
- Resting place: Beechwood Cemetery, Ottawa
- Occupation: Civil Servant
- Spouse: Mary Louisa DeBelle (née Dibble)
- Children: Margery, Faith, Basil, Dorothy
- Writing career
- Language: English
- Genre: Poetry
- Notable works: Lake Lyrics and Other Poems
- Notable awards: FRSC
- Movement: Confederation Poets

William Wilfred Campbell (1 June c. 1860 – 1 January 1918) was a Canadian poet. He is often categorized as one of the country's Confederation Poets, a group that included Charles G.D. Roberts, Bliss Carman, Archibald Lampman, and Duncan Campbell Scott; he was a colleague of Lampman and Scott. By the end of the 19th century, he was considered the "unofficial poet laureate of Canada." Although not as well known as the other Confederation poets today, Campbell was a "versatile, interesting writer" who was influenced by Robert Burns, the English Romantics, Edgar Allan Poe, Ralph Waldo Emerson, Henry Wadsworth Longfellow, Thomas Carlyle, and Alfred Tennyson. Inspired by these writers, Campbell expressed his own religious idealism in traditional forms and genres.

== Life ==
William Wilfred Campbell was born around 1 June circa 1860 in Berlin, Canada West, now Kitchener, Ontario. (Note: There is a lack of consensus regarding Campbell's year of birth, though his birth date is generally noted as June 1. Most references also note his place of birth as Berlin, Ontario. The Dictionary of Canadian Biography as an outlier in noting his date of birth as June 15 and the location as Newmarket, Upper Canada.) His father, Rev. Thomas Swainston Campbell, was an Anglican clergyman who had been assigned the task of setting up several frontier parishes in "Canada West", as Ontario was then called. Consequently, the family moved frequently.

The Campbell family settled in Wiarton, Ontario in 1871, where Wilfred grew up, attending high school (which was later renamed the Owen Sound Collegiate and Vocational Institute) in nearby Owen Sound. At that time he also conducted a choir. Campbell would look back on his childhood with fondness:

As a boy, I always enjoyed the campfires we built in the woods or on the shingly beach of some lone lake shore, when the stars came out and peered down on the windy darkness and swallowed up the sparks and flames from the crackling logs and dry branches we heaped up while the local warmth and radiance added a contrast to the outside vastness of darkness and cold.

Campbell taught in Wiarton before enrolling in the University of Toronto's University College in 1880, Wycliffe College in 1882, and at the Episcopal Theological School in Cambridge, Massachusetts, in 1883.

In 1885 Campbell was ordained to the Episcopal priesthood, and was soon appointed to a New England parish. In 1888 he returned to Canada and became rector of St. Stephen, New Brunswick. In 1891, after suffering a crisis of faith, Campbell resigned from the ministry and took a civil service position in Ottawa. He received a permanent position in the Department of Militia and Defence two years later.

Living in Ottawa, Campbell became acquainted with Archibald Lampman—his next door neighbour at one time—and through him with Duncan Campbell Scott. In February 1892, Campbell, Lampman, and Scott began writing a column of literary essays and criticism called "At the Mermaid Inn" for The Globe. As Lampman wrote to a friend:

Campbell is deplorably poor.... Partly in order to help his pockets a little Mr. Scott and I decided to see if we could get the Toronto Globe to give us space for a couple of columns of paragraphs & short articles, at whatever pay we could get for them. They agreed to it; and Campbell, Scott and I have been carrying on the thing for several weeks now.

The column ran only until July 1893. Lampman and Scott found it difficult to "keep a rein on Campbell's frank expression of his heterodox opinions." Readers of The Globe reacted negatively when Campbell presented the history of the cross as a mythic symbol. His apology for "overestimating their intellectual capacities" did little to resolve the controversy.

In the 20th century, Campbell became a strong advocate of British imperialism, for example telling Toronto's Empire Club in 1904 that Canada's only choice lay "between two different imperialisms, that of Britain and that of the Imperial Commonwealth to the south." It was the principles of Imperialist that guided his work in Poems of loyalty by British and Canadian authors (London, 1913) and for The Oxford Book of Canadian Verse (Toronto, 1913).

As editor of The Oxford book of Canadian Verse, Campbell devoted more pages to his own poetry than to others'. But by choosing mostly from his longer work—including an excerpt from Mordred (one of his verse dramas)—he did not choose his best work. In contrast, the poems he selected from his fellow Confederation Poets reflected some of their best work.

Campbell was transferred to the Dominion Archives in 1909. In 1915 he moved his family to an old stone farmhouse on the outskirts of Ottawa, which he named "Kilmorie". He died of pneumonia on New Year's morning, 1918. He was buried in Ottawa's Beechwood Cemetery.

The William Wilfred Campbell Poetry Festival was held in Wiarton, Ontario in his honour from 2014 to 2019.

== Writing ==
Campbell's first chapbook, Poems!, "seems to have been printed at a newspaper office sometime around 1879 or 1880." He placed poetry in the University of Toronto Varsity in 1881.

As a theology student in Massachusetts, Campbell met Oliver Wendell Holmes, who recommended his poetry to Atlantic Monthly editor Thomas Bailey Aldrich. Aldrich published Campbell's "Canadian Folk Song" in the January 1885 issue, launching his career in the American magazines.

In 1888 Snowflakes and Sunbeams was printed at Campbell's expense in St. Stephen, New Brunswick. The book "was favourably reviewed in Canada and the United States for its lovely nature lyrics, one of which, 'Indian summer' (it starts with 'Along the line of smoky hills / The crimson forest stands'), remains among the most beloved of Canadian poems." The entire volume, including "Indian Summer," was incorporated into Lake Lyrics, published the following year. "The poems in Lake lyrics and other poems (1889), with their intense rhythms, dramatic imagery, and ardent spirituality, express Campbell's devotion to nature as the revelation of God's presence; this book established his reputation as 'laureate of the lakes.'" Notable new poems in the book included "Vapor and Blue" and "The Winter Lakes".

Campbell's poem "The Mother" was printed in Harper's New Monthly in April 1891; a traditional ballad, the poem tells of a dead mother who rises from the grave to claim her still-living baby. It "created a sensation in the literary press and was reprinted in newspapers such as the Week and The Globe in Toronto. In September 1891, the House of Commons (and, in 1892, the Senate) debated whether Campbell should receive a permanent civil service position in recognition of his literary abilities. The proposal was defeated, ostensibly for practical reasons, and the decision established a precedent for withholding patronage from artists. Nevertheless, in 1893 he was quietly given a permanent position in the Department of Militia and Defence, and he would remain a civil servant until his death."

Campbell's third book of poetry, The Dread Voyage Poems (1893), was darker than the earlier two. "In this volume, his poetry began to show the preoccupation with harmonizing religion, science, and social theory that had started while he was still a clergyman and would continue through his middle age." The book contains some of Campbell's best-known poems, such as "How One Winter Came in the Lake Region" and the 'surprise ending' sonnet, "Morning on the Shore."

"In 1895 he published two versified tragedies, Mordred and Hildebrand, and these were included, with two others, Daulac and Morning, in a volume entitled Poetical tragedies (1908)." Also in 1895, Campbell sparked a literary controversy by accusing Bliss Carman of plagiarism, an incident documented in Alexandra Hurst's 1994 book, The War Among the Poets (Canadian Poetry Press).

Campbell published a new book of lyrics, Beyond the Hills of Dream, in 1899. "Included in the book was his jubilee ode 'Victoria,' written for the Queen's diamond jubilee in 1897. Eleven of its thirty-five other poems were reprinted from The Dread Voyage, thus perpetuating the dark tone of the earlier volume. Sombre also was "Bereavement of the Fields," one of the better new poems, written in memory of Archibald Lampman, who died on 10 February 1899."

"The early years of the twentieth century saw a prolific outpouring of prose from Campbell. In addition to numerous pamphlets, he wrote five historical novels and three works of non-fiction. Only two of his novels ever appeared in book form: Ian of the Orcades (1906) ... and A Beautiful Rebel (1909). Another novel was never re-printed after its appearance in The Christian Guardian, and two novels still remain only in manuscript form. Two of his works of non-fiction were labours of love: a book about the Great Lakes (1910, reprinted and enlarged 1914), and an account of the Scottish settlements in Eastern Canada (1911). The title of the former is quite a mouthful: The Beauty, History, Romance, and Mystery of the Canadian Lake Region. Campbell intersperses these descriptive sketches, which appeared originally in The Westminster magazine, with selections of his lake lyrics to give the reader a very personal tour of the region. Subjective, also, is the bias of The Scotsman in Canada, which credits Scots with laying the foundation of nearly everything that is admirable in Canada."

In 1914, with war threatening, Campbell published a book of imperialistic verse, Sagas of a Vaster Britain. "Many of its seventy poems were recycled from previous collections, patriotic effusions like "England" ("Over the freedom and peace of the world/ Is the flag of England flung"), and some of his best work like "How One Winter Came to the Lake Region". The new poems, like "Life's Ocean" and "The Dream Divine," have the old weaknesses of displeasing sound ("large-mooned waters") and awkward structure ("And of all love's far, dim dawnings of hope unborn/ God's latest are best")." "Sagas ... was his last book, but each New Year's from 1915 to 1918 he distributed pamphlets of poems relating to World War I."

When Campbell died in 1918, his "popularity died with him. Technically, his work is usually conservative, and his ideas have become unfashionable. His poetry has been compared with the more polished works" of the four major Confederation poets. "In fact," though, as the DCB sums up his career, "Campbell worked hard to achieve naturalness, sincerity, and simplicity of expression, rather than polish; he tried to convey universal truths in order to inspire his readers to strive toward their noblest ideals. Within this framework, the artistic merit of many of his poems becomes evident."

Campbell was elected a Fellow of the Royal Society of Canada in 1894. He was declared a Person of National Historic Significance in 1938.

== Wife and family ==
Campbell married Mary Louisa DeBelle (née Dibble) in 1884. They had four children, Margery, Faith, Basil, and Dorothy. Their daughter Margery married George Archibald Grey (1886–1952), a grandson of Admiral George Grey (1809–1891), a younger son of Charles Grey, 2nd Earl Grey. The earldom was inherited in 1963 by Margery's grandson Richard Grey and in 2013 by her grandson Philip Grey.

== Bibliography ==
=== Poetry ===
- Poems! (1879-1880?)
- Snowflakes and Sunbeams. St. Stephen, N.B: St. Croix Courier Press. 1988.
- Lake Lyrics and Other Poems. St. John: J.& A. McMillan. 1889.
- The Dread Voyage Poems. Toronto: William Briggs. 1893.
- Mordred and Hildebrand [microform] : a book of tragedies. Ottawa: J. Durie. 1895. ISBN 9780665004117.
- Beyond the hills of dream. Boston: Houghton, Mifflin. 1899.
- The poems of Wilfred Campbell. Toronto: William Briggs, 1905
- The collected poems of Wilfred Campbell. New York, Chicago [etc]: F. H. Revell company.
- Poetical tragedies. Toronto: Briggs.
- Sagas of vaster Britain : poems of the race, the empire and the divinity of man. London, Toronto: Hodder and Stoughton.
- Sykes, W. J. (William John) (ed.). Poetical works. London: Hodder and Stoughton.
- Klinck, Carl F., ed. (1976). Selected poems. Ottawa: Tecumseh Press. ISBN 9780919662575.
- Souster, Raymond, ed. (1978). Vapour and blue : Souster selects Campbell : the poetry of William Wilfred Campbell. Sutton West, Ont.: Paget Press. ISBN 9780920348031.
- Boone, Laurel, ed. (1987). William Wilfred Campbell : selected poetry and essays. Waterloo, Ont.: Wilfrid Laurier University Press. ISBN 9780889209602.

=== Fiction ===
- Ian of the Orcades. New York, Chicago [etc.]: Fleming H. Revell company. 1907.
- A beautiful rebel : a romance of Upper Canada in eighteen hundred and twelve. Toronto: Westminster. 1909.

=== Non-fiction ===
- Canada. text to Illustrations in Canada by Thomas Mower Martin. Toronto: Macmillan, 1907. (London, 1907)
- The beauty, history, romance and mystery of the Canadian lake region. Toronto: The Musson Book Company. 1910.
- Bryce, George (1911). The Scotsman in Canada : in two volumes. Toronto, Canada; London, England: The Musson Book Company, Limited.
- At the Mermaid Inn: Wilfred Campbell, Archibald Lampman, Duncan Campbell Scott in the Globe 1892–3, ed. Barrie Davies (Toronto: U of Toronto P, 1979

=== Edited works ===
- The Oxford book of Canadian verse. Toronto: Oxford University Press. 1913.
- Poems of loyalty by British and Canadian authors. London: Nelson.

== In popular culture ==
His poem "England" is given in an old-fashioned, bombastic style at a charity concert in the comedy TV series Jeeves and Wooster, series 1, episode 2, title:"Bertie is in Love".
