= Sir Edward Wakefield, 1st Baronet =

British civil servant and Conservative Party politician

Sir Edward Wakefield 1st Baronet CIE

Government Deputy Chief Whip in the House of Commons Treasurer of the Household
- In office 21 June 1960 – 6 March 1962
- Prime Minister: Harold Macmillan
- Preceded by: Peter Legh
- Succeeded by: Michael Hughes-Young

Vice-Chamberlain of the Household
- In office 16 January 1959 – 21 June 1960
- Prime Minister: Harold Macmillan
- Preceded by: Peter Legh
- Succeeded by: Richard Brooman-White

Comptroller of the Household
- In office 23 October 1958 – 16 January 1959
- Prime Minister: Harold Macmillan
- Preceded by: Gerald Wills
- Succeeded by: Harwood Harrison

Member of Parliament for West Derbyshire
- In office 23 February 1950 – 7 March 1962
- Preceded by: Charles White
- Succeeded by: Aidan Crawley

Personal details
- Born: Edward Birkbeck Wakefield; 24 July 1903 Kendal, Westmorland, UK
- Died: 14 January 1969 (aged 65)
- Party: Conservative
- Children: Humphry Wakefield
- Parent: Roger Wakefield (father)
- Relatives: Wavell Wakefield & Roger Cuthbert Wakefield (brothers)
- Education: Haileybury and Imperial Service College
- Alma mater: Trinity College, Cambridge
- Occupation: Civil servant

Sir Edward Birkbeck Wakefield, 1st Baronet, CIE (24 July 1903 – 14 January 1969) was a British civil servant and Conservative Party politician.

== Early life ==
Wakefield was born 24 July 1903 in Kendal the third son of Roger William Wakefield. His elder brother was Wavell Wakefield, 1st Baron Wakefield of Kendal, also a Conservative politician. His youngest brother, Roger Cuthbert Wakefield, was an early British & Irish Lion, touring on the 1927 British Lions tour to Argentina.

He was educated at Haileybury and at Trinity College, Cambridge, afterwards joining the Indian Civil Service in 1927 and serving in Punjab, Rajputana, Kathiawar, Baluchistan, Central India, Tibet and the Persian Gulf. He was Chief Minister of Kalat State 1933–1936, of Nabha State 1939–1941 and of Rewa State 1943–1945, and was Joint Secretary, Political Department, Delhi, 1946–1947. He was awarded a bronze medal of the Royal Humane Society in 1936.

== Political career ==
He was elected as the member of parliament (MP) for West Derbyshire in 1950, holding the seat until 1962. He held a series of appointments as a whip, first as Assistant Whip, 1954–1956; then as a Lord Commissioner of the Treasury, 1956–1958; Comptroller of Her Majesty's Household, 1958–1959; Vice-Chamberlain of the Household, 1959–1960; and Treasurer of the Household, 1960–1962.

He resigned from the House of Commons in 1962, when he was appointed as Commissioner for Malta, 1962–64, becoming High Commissioner 1964–1965.

== Personal life ==
He was appointed a Companion of the Order of the Indian Empire in 1945, and was created a baronet, of Kendal in the County of Westmorland, in 1962. Wakefield died in January 1969, aged 65, and was succeeded in the baronetcy by his son Humphry.

Coat of arms of Sir Edward Wakefield, 1st Baronet
Crest A bat displayed proper charged on each wing with a crescent argent. Escutcheon Argent two barrulets sable between three owls proper. Motto Be Just And Fear Not Orders Insignia of a Companion of the Order of the Indian Empire

Parliament of the United Kingdom
Preceded by Charles White	Member of Parliament for West Derbyshire; 1950–1962	Succeeded by Aidan Crawley
Political offices
Preceded by Gerard Wills	Comptroller of the Household; 1958–1959	Succeeded by Harwood Harrison
Preceded by Peter Legh	Vice-Chamberlain of the Household; 1959–1960	Succeeded by Richard Brooman-White
Preceded by Peter Legh	Deputy Chief Whip of the House of Commons; Treasurer of the Household; 1960–1962	Succeeded by Michael Hughes-Young
Party political offices
Preceded by Peter Legh	Conservative Deputy Chief Whip in the House of Commons; 1960–1962	Succeeded by Michael Hughes-Young
Baronetage of the United Kingdom
New creation	Baronet (of Kendal); 1962–1969	Succeeded by Humphry Wakefield
