= Evelyn Baring, 1st Baron Howick of Glendale =

British diplomat (1903–1973)

The Right Honourable The Lord Howick of Glendale KG GCMG KCVO
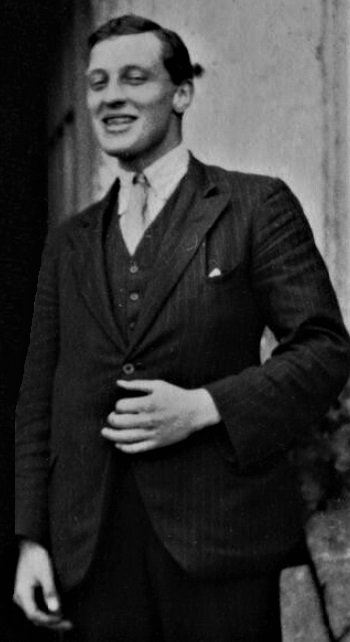
- Baring in 1926

Governor of Kenya
- In office 30 September 1952 – 4 October 1959
- Monarch: Elizabeth II
- Preceded by: Sir Philip Euen Mitchell
- Succeeded by: Sir Patrick Muir Renison

High Commissioner for Southern Africa
- In office 7 October 1944 – 1 October 1951
- Monarch: George VI
- Preceded by: The Lord Harlech
- Succeeded by: Sir John le Rougetel

Governor of Southern Rhodesia
- In office 10 December 1942 – 26 October 1944
- Monarch: George VI
- Preceded by: Sir Herbert Stanley
- Succeeded by: Sir Campbell Tait

Member of the House of Lords
- Lord Temporal
- In office 9 February 1960 – 10 March 1973
- Preceded by: Peerage created
- Succeeded by: The 2nd Baron Howick of Glendale

Personal details
- Born: Charles Evelyn Baring; 29 September 1903 England
- Died: 10 March 1973 (aged 69) Northumberland, England, United Kingdom
- Spouse: Lady Mary Cecil Gray
- Children: 3, including Charles, 2nd Baron Howick of Glendale
- Education: New College, Oxford
- Awards: Knight of the Order of the Garter; Knight Grand Cross of the Order of Saint Michael and Saint George; Knight Commander of the Royal Victorian Order

Evelyn Baring, 1st Baron Howick of Glendale (29 September 1903 – 10 March 1973), was Governor of Southern Rhodesia from 1942 to 1944, High Commissioner for Southern Africa from 1944 to 1951, and Governor of Kenya from 1952 to 1959. Baring played an integral role in the suppression of the Mau Mau rebellion. Together with Colonial Secretary Alan Lennox-Boyd, Baring played a significant role in the government's efforts to deal with the rebellion, and see Kenya through to independence. He was appointed as Baron Howick of Glendale in 1960 by Queen Elizabeth II.

== Education and early career ==
Baring followed in the footsteps of his father, the famed "Maker of Modern Egypt" – Evelyn Baring, 1st Earl of Cromer. Baring went to Winchester College and then to New College, Oxford, graduating from Oxford University with First Class Honours in Modern History before serving in the Indian Civil Service. He then joined Britain's Foreign Office, where he was sent first to Southern Rhodesia before being posted in South Africa as High Commissioner.

== Seretse Khama ==
In 1949, while serving as High Commissioner for Southern Africa, Baring played a key role in preventing Seretse Khama, the heir to the throne of the Bechuanaland Protectorate, from assuming the throne; doing so on the ground that Khama's marriage to a white woman, Ruth Williams, was opposed by the white-minority government of South Africa, a neighbouring state which had recently implemented a system of racial segregation known as apartheid.

Working in close collaboration with Percivale Liesching, who was serving as Under-Secretary of State for Commonwealth Affairs at the time, Baring was able to persuade government ministers to prevent Khama from assuming the throne of Bechuanaland, instead mandating him to stay in a government-imposed exile in London, which lasted until 1956.

== Governorship in Kenya ==
As Governor of Kenya, Baring declared a State of Emergency on 20 October 1952 before launching Operation Jock Scott, which targeted alleged Mau Mau leaders, especially Jomo Kenyatta. Baring's administration created the "dilution technique", the systematic torture of detainees, to force compliance. Baring requested and received approval to use "overpowering" force from the Colonial Secretary in London.

In June 1957, Baring passed on to Alan Lennox-Boyd a secret memorandum written by Sir Eric Griffiths-Jones, the Attorney General of Kenya, which described the abuse of Mau Mau detainees. The paper alleges that Baring supplied a covering letter that asserted that inflicting "violent shock" was the only way of suppressing the Mau Mau rebellion.

== Career after Kenya ==
Baring left Kenya in 1959. He was elevated to the Peerage of the United Kingdom as Baron Howick of Glendale in 1960. He retired to his family estate of Howick Hall, which was inherited by his wife Lady Mary Cecil Grey, daughter of the 5th Earl Grey. He was known to enjoy birdwatching. Lord Howick of Glendale later accepted a post with the government's Colonial Development Corporation.

== Marriage and children ==
Baring married Lady Mary Cecil Grey, daughter of the 5th Earl Grey and Lady Mabel Laura Georgiana Palmer (daughter of the 2nd Earl of Selborne), on 24 April 1935. They had three children:

- The Hon. Katherine Mary Alice Baring (born 30 March 1936), married Sir Humphry Wakefield, 2nd Baronet,
- Charles Evelyn Baring, 2nd Baron Howick of Glendale (born 30 December 1937), and
- The Hon. Elizabeth Beatrice Baring (born 10 January 1940), married Nicholas Albany Gibbs.

Lord Howick of Glendale died from injuries sustained in a climbing accident on 10 March 1973, at the age of 69. He was climbing a cliff on his estate when he slipped and fell 15 feet. He was succeeded in the barony by his son, Charles.

== Honours ==
- Knight Commander of the Order of St Michael and St George (KCMG), 1942, advanced to GCMG, 1955
- Knight Commander of the Royal Victorian Order (KCVO), 1947
- Baron Howick of Glendale, 1960
- Knight Companion of the Order of the Garter (KG), 1972

== Arms ==
Coat of arms of Evelyn Baring, 1st Baron Howick of Glendale, KG, GCMG, KCVO
Coronet Coronet of a Baron Crest A Mullet Erminois, two of the points resting on the pinions of a pair of Wings conjoined and elevated Argent. Escutcheon Azure, on a Fess Or, an Eastern Crown Azure, in chief a Bear's Head proper, muzzled Or. Supporters Dexter: A Tiger guardant proper, gorged with an Eastern Crown Or. Sinister: a Lion guardant Purpure, crowned with a Ducal Coronet Or, and gorged with an Eastern Crown Or. Motto DE BON VOULOIR SERVIR LE ROI (To serve the King with goodwill) Orders Order of the Garter circlet (Appointed 23 April 1977)

Government offices
Preceded by Fraser Russell	Governor of Southern Rhodesia; 1942–1944	Succeeded by Robert James Hudson
Preceded by Sir Philip Mitchell	Governor of Kenya; 1952–1959	Succeeded by Sir Patrick Muir Renison
Diplomatic posts
Preceded by The Lord Harlech	British High Commissioner to South Africa; 1944–1951	Succeeded by John Le Rougetel
Peerage of the United Kingdom
New creation	Baron Howick of Glendale; 1960–1973; Member of the House of Lords (1960–1973)	Succeeded by Charles Baring
