= Howick Hall =

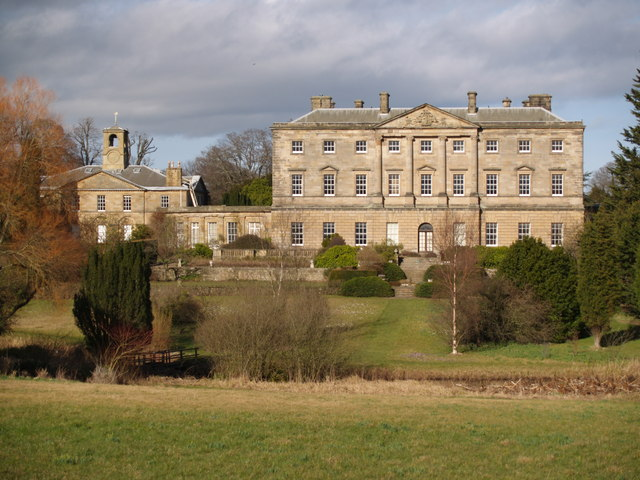

- Location within Northumberland
- 55.451°N 1.610°W
- Location: Howick, Northumberland

History
- Built: 14th century (site)
- Rebuilt: 1928

Site notes
- Current use: Seat of the Barons Howick of Glendale

Listed Building – Grade II*
- Designated: 1 January 1985
- Reference no.: 1001048

Howick Hall, a Grade II* listed building in the village of Howick, Northumberland, England, is the ancestral seat of the Earls Grey. It was the home of the Prime Minister Charles, 2nd Earl Grey (1764–1845), after whom Earl Grey tea is named. Howick Hall is the location of the Howick Hall Gardens & Arboretum.

== Older versions of Howick ==
Howick has been owned by the Grey family since 1319. A tower house, which once stood on the site and was demolished in 1780, was described in a survey of 1715 as "a most magnificent freestone edifice in a square figure, flat roofed and embattled" and with "a handsome court and gateway on the front".

== 1782 version and 1809 expansion ==
The Hall which stands on the site today was built in 1782 by Newcastle architect, William Newton. The entrance was originally on the south side. The 2nd Earl Grey employed George Wyatt in 1809 to enlarge the house by moving the entrance to the north side, filling out the front hall and the two quadrants linking the house to its wings, and building the first terrace on the south side.

== Destruction by fire and rebuilding ==
A fire destroyed the whole of the interior of the main house in 1926, with all of the contents of the top two floors. It was rebuilt in 1928 to designs by Sir Herbert Baker and George Reavell, who altered the north façade by introducing a portico above the front hall, in order to make the house smaller with an open well in the middle, with a rotunda linking the front and back on the ground floor.

== Use since the 1960s ==
The family moved out of the main house shortly after the death of Charles Grey, 5th Earl Grey in 1963. In 1973 his grandson, Charles Baring, 2nd Baron Howick of Glendale, converted the west wing into a home, where he and his family now live.
