= George Grey (Royal Navy officer, born 1809) =

Admiral George Grey (16 May 1809 – 3 October 1891) was an officer of the Royal Navy.

== Family ==
Born at Fallodon, Northumberland, Grey was a younger son of Charles Grey, 2nd Earl Grey, who was prime minister from 1830 to 1834, and his wife Mary Elizabeth Ponsonby.

His nine brothers included Henry Grey, 3rd Earl Grey (1802–1894), who was Secretary at War in the later 1830s, General Charles Grey (1804–1870), who was private secretary to Prince Albert and Queen Victoria, and Admiral Sir Frederick Grey (1805–1878). In 1827, his sister Lady Caroline married Captain George Barrington RN, who in 1830 became Fourth Sea Lord. In 1829, his sister Lady Mary married Charles Wood, later First Lord of the Admiralty.

== Career ==
Grey entered the Royal Navy on 17 July 1822, aged thirteen, and was a midshipman in the frigate Talbot. In 1827, during the Greek War of Independence, he was at the Battle of Navarino and in 1829 passed the examination for promotion to lieutenant, joining the ship of the line HMS Windsor Castle in the Mediterranean and continuing to serve off the coast of Greece. On 3 September 1831, he was promoted to commander and given an 18-gun sloop-of-war, Scylla. On 10 December 1833, he transferred to the command of the almost new sloop Scout (1832).

In 1834 Grey reached the rank of post-captain and a year later, soon after his brother became Secretary at War, had the distinction of being given the first command of the new frigate HMS Cleopatra, on 12 August 1835. Her first voyage was through the Baltic to the Gulf of Finland, conveying his sister Lady Louisa and her husband John Lambton, 1st Earl of Durham, the new British Ambassador to Russia, to the court of the Emperor Nicholas I at Saint Petersburg. On the way there, Cleopatra ran aground near the Danish island of Læsø in the Bay of Kattegat, and to free her several cannons had to be offloaded onto the Dutch ship Ypres. A court-martial into the grounding in November cleared Grey of any negligence.

Grey was on half-pay from 1838 until 1841, when he got command of the elderly Apollo class frigate HMS Belvidera in the Mediterranean. In 1846 he was made captain of the port of Gibraltar, remaining there some ten years. On 12 November 1856, he was promoted to rear-admiral and in 1858 was posted as Admiral Superintendent at Portsmouth. In 1863 he was promoted to vice-admiral, and in 1867 to admiral.

Grey was mentioned in a debate in the House of Commons in April 1858, when Sir Charles Wood, until a few weeks before First Lord of the Admiralty, praised his work at Gibraltar for greatly contributing to British successes in the Crimean War, while Admiral Sir Charles Napier doubted that either Grey or his brother would have become admirals if they had not been brothers-in-law of the First Lord (meaning Wood).

From 24 to 26 February 1862, on board HMS Victory, Grey presided over a court martial which considered serious allegations against Captain Richard Crawford concerning events off Zanzibar.

Grey joined the retired list of officers in 1866 and from that year received a Greenwich Hospital flag officer's pension of £150 a year. He served as King of Arms of the Order of the Bath.

== Personal life ==
On 20 January 1845, while on half-pay, Grey married Jane Frances Stuart, a daughter of General Sir Patrick Stuart, Governor of Malta, and Catherine Henrietta Rodney, a daughter of Captain John Rodney and grand-daughter of Admiral Lord Rodney. They had eleven children, including their eldest son Charles (1846–1896), Henry George (1851-1925), missionary and Principal of Wycliffe Hall, Oxford, and Francis William Grey (1860–1939), an academic.

Grey died on 3 October 1891, aged 82, at Eaglescarnie, Bolton, East Lothian, the seat of his wife's family.
