= Charles Grey, 5th Earl Grey =

British nobleman (1879–1963)

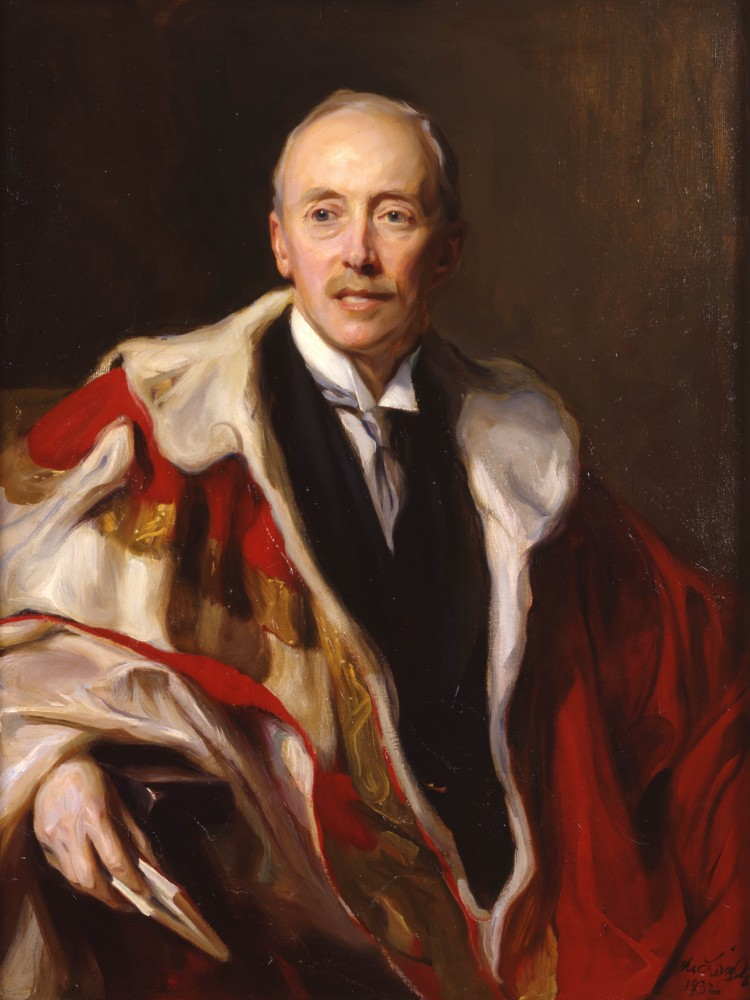
1932 portrait by Philip de László

Charles Robert Grey, 5th Earl Grey DL (15 December 1879 – 2 April 1963), styled Viscount Howick between 1894 and 1917, was a British nobleman, the son of Albert Grey, 4th Earl Grey.

Grey was born in London in 1879 and was the son of the 4th Earl Grey. He attended Eton College, Windsor and graduated with a BA from Trinity College, Cambridge in 1901. At Cambridge he was a member of the University Pitt Club.

== Career ==
He stood as the Liberal Unionist Party candidate for Bradford Central at the January 1910 United Kingdom general election.

As Viscount Howick, he served in the British Army, joining the Northumberland Imperial Yeomanry as a Second lieutenant while still at the university. In January 1902 he was appointed a second-lieutenant in the 1st Life Guards. and by 1915 was General Staff Officer 3rd class. He later gained the rank of Major. After service in the Great War Earl Grey was later made an Honorary Colonel of the Northumberland Volunteer Regiment and Northumberland Fusiliers. Charles Grey was also assistant secretary to the Governor-General of South Africa

Carrying on the proportional representation campaign of his father, in 1928 he made a motion in the House of Lords for an enquiry into the reform.

== Family ==
Grey was married on 16 June 1906 to Lady Mabel Laura Georgiana Palmer, later CBE (1919), the only daughter of William Palmer, 2nd Earl of Selborne. They had two daughters:

- Lady Mary Cecil Grey (1907–2002); married Evelyn Baring, 1st Baron Howick of Glendale and had issue, including Charles Baring, 2nd Baron Howick of Glendale
- Lady Elizabeth Katherine Grey (1908–1941); married Lt-Col Ronald Dawnay (brother of David Dawnay and grandson of Hugh Dawnay, 8th Viscount Downe) and had issue

5th Earl Grey died in Howick, near Alnwick, Northumberland, in 1963.

He was succeeded by his second cousin twice removed Richard Grey, 6th Earl Grey, but he broke the entail on the Howick Hall estate to leave it to his grandson Charles Baring, 2nd Baron Howick of Glendale, the son of his eldest daughter, Lady Mary.

== Arms ==
Coat of arms of Charles Grey, 5th Earl Grey
Crest A scaling ladder or, hooked and pointed sable. Escutcheon Gules, a lion rampant, within a bordure engrailed, argent, in dexter chief point a mullet or. Supporters Dexter, a lion guardant purpure, ducally crowned or; sinister, a tiger guardant, proper. Motto De bon vouloir servir le roy (To serve the king with good will).

== See also ==
- Earl Grey

Peerage of the United Kingdom
Preceded by Albert Grey	Earl Grey; 1917 – 1963	Succeeded by Richard Grey
