= Grey family =

British noble family

Grey
- Country: United Kingdom
- Earlier spellings: de Greye
- Origin: Normandy
- Founded: 11th century
- Founder: Anchetil de Greye
- Titles: • Queen of England (disputed) • Queen of Ireland (disputed) • Duke of Suffolk • Duke of Kent • Marquess of Dorset • Earl of Stamford • Earl of Huntingdon • Earl of Tankerville • Earl de Grey • Earl Grey • Earl of Kent • Viscount Fallodon • Viscount Glendale • Viscount Howick • Baron Powis • Baron Wilton • Baron Werke • Baron Codnor • Baron Bonville • Baron Walsingham • Baron Rotherfield • Lord Gray • Grey baronets
- Estates: • Wingfield Castle • Bradgate House • Dunham Massey

The Grey family is an English family, descending from the Anglo-Norman de Greye family. The patriarch of the family was Anchetil de Greye, a Norman chevalier and vassal of William FitzOsbern, 1st Earl of Hereford, one of the few proven companions of William the Conqueror known to have fought at the Battle of Hastings in 1066.

In the 13th century, the Greys were ennobled as Barons Grey of Codnor, and of Ruthyn, and of Wilton. Some members of the family were later elevated as viscounts, earls, marquesses, dukes, and in the 16th century, one member became monarch. Among them, King Edward VI declared his cousin Lady Jane Grey, "the Nine Days Queen", to be his successor as monarch of England and Ireland, and on his death, she reigned from 10 July through 19 July 1553 (according to her claim as the great-granddaughter of King Henry VII via her parents Henry Grey, 1st Duke of Suffolk, and Frances Grey, Duchess of Suffolk, daughter of Mary Tudor, Queen of France), until she was deposed by her cousin Mary I, Queen of England, Ireland and Spain. Notably, Charles Grey, 2nd Earl Grey became Prime Minister of the United Kingdom and abolished slavery in the British Empire in 1833.

== Grey lineage ==
=== 11th century ===
Anchetil de Greye (c. 1052 – after 1086) is listed in the Domesday Book of 1086 as the lord of six Oxfordshire manors. His descendant was Sir Henry de Grey.

=== 13th century ===
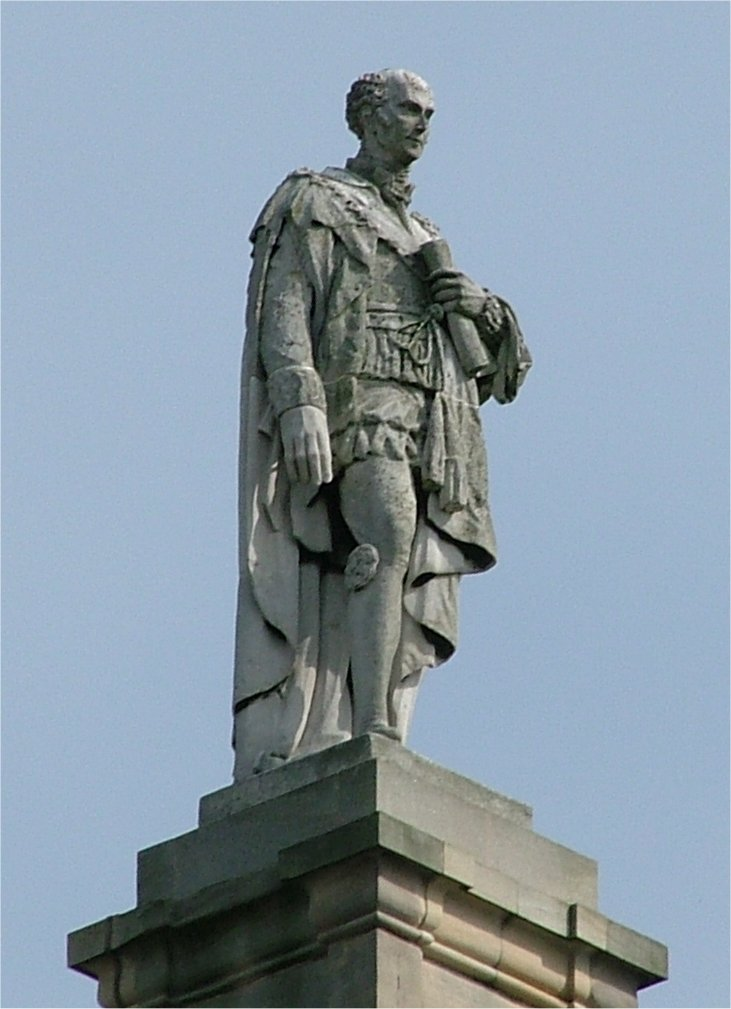
Grey's Monument (erected in 1833), in remembrance of Prime Minister Charles Grey, 2nd Earl Grey, abolisher of slavery in the British Empire (1833)

Reginald de Grey, 1st Baron Grey de Wilton (c. 1240–1308) was the son of Sir John de Grey and the namesake of one of the four Inns of Court, being Gray's Inn, which became of Reginald de Grey's Portpoole Manor. He was one of three commanders appointed by Edward I of England in his 1282 campaign against Llywelyn ap Gruffudd, the rebellious last native Prince of Wales.

=== 14th century ===
John de Grey, 1st Baron Grey de Rotherfield (c. 1300–1359) is listed in the Bruges Garter Book as a founding knight of the Most Noble Order of the Garter and a companion of Edward the Black Prince. He was Lord Steward of the Royal Household of King Edward III.

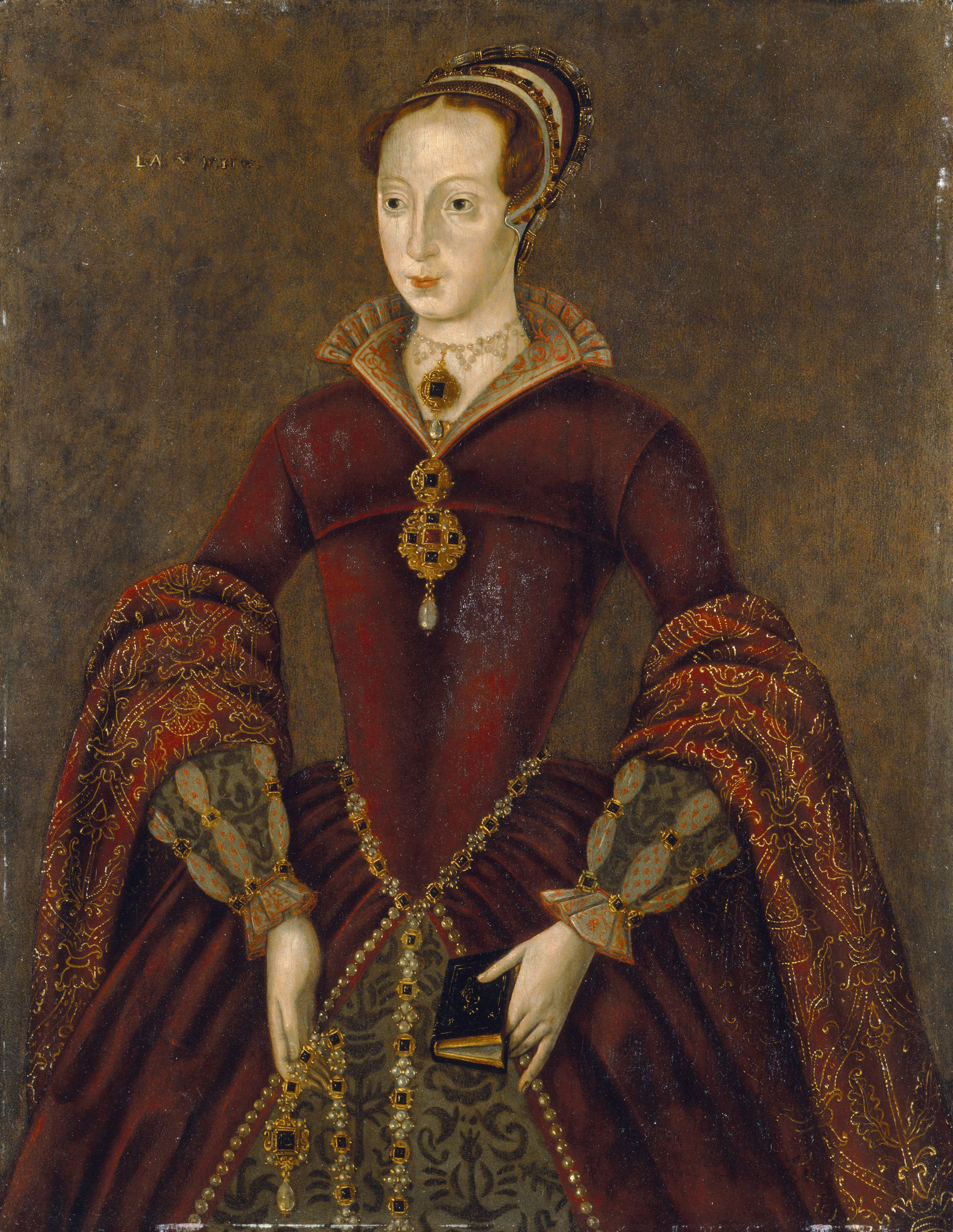
The Streatham portrait of Lady Jane Grey, the Nine Days' Queen, monarch of England and Ireland

=== 16th century ===
Lady Jane Grey (c. 1537–1554) "the Nine Days' Queen" was the daughter of Henry Grey, 1st Duke of Suffolk and Queen of England and Ireland. Lady Jane was the great-granddaughter of King Henry VII through his daughter Mary Tudor, Queen of France. Due to this and her avowed Protestantism, King Edward VI nominated Lady Jane as his successor to the Crown, and she became Queen of England and Ireland on 10 July 1553, until her deposition on 19 July 1553 by Mary I of England. In February 1554, both she and her father were executed for treason.

=== 19th century ===
Charles Grey, 2nd Earl Grey (c. 1764–1845) was the son of Charles Grey, 1st Earl Grey and Prime Minister of the United Kingdom. Lord Grey's government enacted the abolition of slavery in the British Empire by initiating the mass purchase of slaves from their owners in 1833. He had previously resigned as foreign secretary in 1807 to protest the King's uncompromising rejection of Catholic Emancipation. He is the namesake of Earl Grey tea.

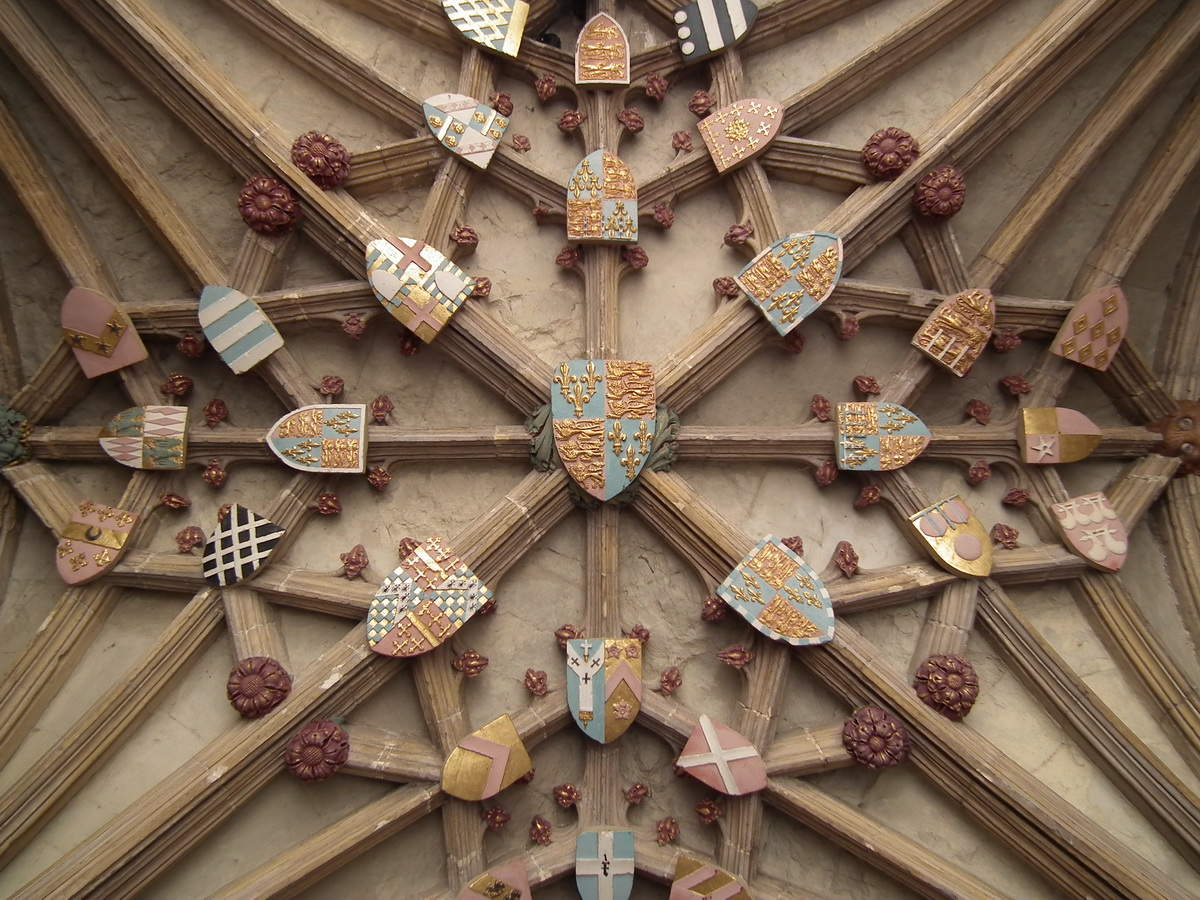
Arms of Baron Grey of Codnor on a ceiling boss in the South Porch of Canterbury Cathedral, built in 1422

=== 20th century ===
Edward Grey, 1st Viscount Grey of Fallodon (c. 1862–1933) is Britain’s longest serving Secretary of State for Foreign Affairs (1905–1916). He was the main force behind British foreign policy in the era of World War I, the centrepiece of his foreign policy being the defence of France against German aggression, while avoiding a binding alliance with Paris. His most consequential achievement in foreign policy was otherwise securing the Anglo-Russian entente of 1907.

=== Family tree ===
Partial family tree
- Sir Henry de Grey
  - Richard de Grey
    - John de Grey of Codnor
      - Henry Grey, 1st Baron Grey of Codnor
        - Richard Grey, 2nd Baron Grey of Codnor
          - John Grey, 3rd Baron Grey of Codnor
            - Henry Grey
              - Richard Grey, 4th Baron Grey of Codnor
                - John Grey, 5th Baron Grey of Codnor
                - Henry Grey, 6th Baron Grey of Codnor
                  - Henry Grey, 7th Baron Grey of Codnor
  - Sir John de Grey
    - Reginald de Grey, 1st Baron Grey de Wilton
      - John Grey, 2nd Baron Grey de Wilton
        - Henry Grey, 3rd Baron Grey de Wilton
          - Reginald Grey, 4th Baron Grey de Wilton
            - Henry Grey, 5th Baron Grey de Wilton
              - Richard Grey, 6th Baron Grey de Wilton
                - Reginald Grey, 7th Baron Grey de Wilton
                  - John Grey, 8th Baron Grey de Wilton
                    - Edmund Grey, 9th Baron Grey de Wilton
                      - George Grey, 10th Baron Grey de Wilton
                      - Thomas Grey, 11th Baron Grey de Wilton
                      - Richard Grey, 12th Baron Grey de Wilton
                      - William Grey, 13th Baron Grey de Wilton
                        - Arthur Grey, 14th Baron Grey de Wilton
                          - Thomas Grey, 15th Baron Grey de Wilton
                          - Bridget Egerton, married Sir Roland Egerton, 1st Baronet
                            - Sir John Egerton, 2nd Baronet
                              - Sir John Egerton, 3rd Baronet
                                - Sir Holland Egerton, 4th Baronet
                                  - Sir Edward Egerton, 5th Baronet
                                  - Sir Thomas Grey Egerton, 6th Baronet
                                    - Thomas Egerton, 1st Earl of Wilton
                            - Sir Philip Egerton
                              - Philip Egerton
                                - John Egerton
                                  - Philip Egerton
                                    - Sir John Grey Egerton, 8th Baronet
                                    - Sir Philip Grey Egerton, 9th Baronet
                                      - Sir Philip Grey Egerton, 10th Baronet
                                        - Sir Philip Grey Egerton, 11th Baronet
                                          - Sir Philip Grey Egerton, 12th Baronet
                                      - William Henry Egerton
                                        - Sir Brooke de Malpas Grey Egerton, 13th Baronet
                                      - Caledon Richard Egerton
                                        - Caledon Philip Egerton
                                          - Sir Philip Reginald le Belward Grey Egerton, 14th Baronet
                                            - Sir John Grey Egerton, 15th Baronet
                                        - Sir Charles Comyn Egerton
                                          - Wion de Malpas Egerton
                                            - Sir David Egerton, 16th Baronet
                                              - Sir William de Malpas Egerton, 17th Baronet
        - Roger Grey, 1st Baron Grey of Ruthin
          - Reynold Grey, 2nd Baron Grey of Ruthin
            - Reynold Grey, 3rd Baron Grey of Ruthin
              - Sir John Grey
                - Edmund Grey, 1st Earl of Kent
                  - George Grey, 2nd Earl of Kent
                    - Richard Grey, 3rd Earl of Kent
                    - Anne Grey, Baroness Hussey
                    - Henry Grey, 4th Earl of Kent
                      - Henry Grey
                        - Reginald Grey, 5th Earl of Kent
                        - Henry Grey, 6th Earl of Kent
                        - Charles Grey, 7th Earl of Kent
                          - Henry Grey, 8th Earl of Kent
                          - Susan Grey, married Sir Michael Longueville
                            - Charles Longueville, 12th Baron Grey of Ruthin
                              - Susan Longueville, 13th Baroness Grey of Ruthin, married Sir Henry Yelverton, 2nd Baronet
                                - Charles Yelverton, 14th Baron Grey of Ruthin
                                - Henry Yelverton, 1st Viscount Longueville, 15th Baron Grey of Ruthin
                                  - Talbot Yelverton, 1st Earl of Sussex, 16th Baron Grey of Ruthin
                                    - George Augustus Yelverton, 2nd Earl of Sussex, 17th Baron Grey of Ruthin
                                    - Henry Yelverton, 3rd Earl of Sussex, 18th Baron Grey of Ruthin
                                      - Lady Barbara Yelverton, married Edward Thoroton Gould
                                        - Henry Yelverton, 19th Baron Grey of Ruthin
                                          - Barbara Rawdon-Hastings, Marchioness of Hastings, 20th Baroness Grey of Ruthin
                                            - Henry Rawdon-Hastings, 4th Marquess of Hastings, 21st Baron Grey of Ruthin
                                            - Bertha Clifton, 22nd Baroness Grey of Ruthin
                                              - Rawdon George Grey Clifton, 23rd Baron Grey of Ruthin
                                              - Cecil Talbot Clifton, 24th Baron Grey of Ruthin
                                              - Ella Cicely Mary Clifton, married Lancelot George Butler-Bowdon
                                                - John Lancelot Wykeham Butler-Bowdon, 25th Baron Grey of Ruthin
                    - Anthony Grey
                      - George Grey
                        - Anthony Grey, 9th Earl of Kent
                          - Henry Grey, 10th Earl of Kent
                            - Anthony Grey, 11th Earl of Kent
                              - Henry Grey, 1st Duke of Kent, 1st Marquess Grey
                                - Anthony Grey, Earl of Harold
                                - Lady Amabel Grey, married John Campbell, 3rd Earl of Breadalbane and Holland
                                  - Jemima Yorke, 2nd Marchioness Grey, married Philip Yorke, 2nd Earl of Hardwicke
                                    - Amabel Hume-Campbell, 1st Countess de Grey
                                    - Lady Mary Jemima Yorke, married Thomas Robinson, 2nd Baron Grantham
                                      - Thomas de Grey, 2nd Earl de Grey
                                      - Frederick John Robinson, 1st Earl of Ripon
                                        - George Robinson, 1st Marquess of Ripon, 3rd Earl de Grey
                                          - Frederick Robinson, 2nd Marquess of Ripon, 4th Earl de Grey
                - Thomas Grey, 1st Baron Richemount Grey
              - Margaret Grey
              - Edward Grey, 6th Baron Ferrers of Groby
                - Sir John Grey of Groby
                  - Thomas Grey, 1st Marquess of Dorset
                    - Thomas Grey, 2nd Marquess of Dorset
                      - Henry Grey, 1st Duke of Suffolk
                        - Lady Jane Grey
                        - Lady Katherine Grey
                        - Lady Mary Grey
                      - Lord John Grey
                        - Henry Grey, 1st Baron Grey of Groby
                          - Sir John Grey
                            - Henry Grey, 1st Earl of Stamford
                              - Thomas Grey, Lord Grey of Groby
                                - Thomas Grey, 2nd Earl of Stamford
                              - Anchitell Grey
                              - John Grey
                                - Harry Grey, 3rd Earl of Stamford
                                  - Harry Grey, 4th Earl of Stamford
                                    - George Grey, 5th Earl of Stamford
                                      - George Grey, 6th Earl of Stamford
                                        - George Grey, 8th Baron Grey of Groby
                                          - George Grey, 7th Earl of Stamford
                                    - Booth Grey
                                      - Booth Grey
                                    - John Grey
                                      - Harry Grey
                                        - Harry Grey, 8th Earl of Stamford
                                        - William Grey
                                          - William Grey, 9th Earl of Stamford
                                            - Roger Grey, 10th Earl of Stamford
                                  - John Grey
                    - Leonard Grey, 1st Viscount Grane
                    - Elizabeth Grey, Countess of Kildare
                    - Eleanor Grey
                - Edward Grey, 1st Viscount Lisle
                  - John Grey, 2nd Viscount Lisle
                    - Elizabeth Grey, Viscountess Lisle
                  - Elizabeth Grey, 6th Baroness Lisle
            - Ida de Grey
  - William de Grey
    - Sir Thomas de Grey
      - Sir Thomas de Grey
        - Fulke de Grey
          - William de Grey
            - William de Grey
              - Thomas de Grey
                - Edmund de Grey
                  - Robert de Grey
                    - Sir William de Grey
                      - James de Grey
                        - William de Grey
                          - Thomas de Grey
                            - Thomas de Grey
                            - William de Grey, 1st Baron Walsingham
                              - Thomas de Grey, 2nd Baron Walsingham
                                - George de Grey, 3rd Baron Walsingham
                                - Thomas de Grey, 4th Baron Walsingham
                                  - Thomas de Grey, 5th Baron Walsingham
                                    - Thomas de Grey, 6th Baron Walsingham
                                    - John Augustus de Grey, 7th Baron Walsingham
                                      - George de Grey, 8th Baron Walsingham
                                        - John de Grey, 9th Baron Walsingham
  - Robert de Grey
    - Walter de Grey
      - Sir Robert de Grey
        - John de Grey, 1st Baron Grey de Rotherfield
          - John de Grey, 2nd Baron Grey de Rotherfield
            - John de Grey, 3rd Baron Grey de Rotherfield
              - Bartholomew de Grey, 4th Baron Grey de Rotherfield
              - Robert de Grey, 5th Baron Grey de Rotherfield

(Separate family?)

- Sir Thomas Grey
  - Sir Thomas Grey
    - Sir Thomas Grey
      - John Grey, 1st Earl of Tankerville
        - Henry Grey, 2nd Earl of Tankerville
          - Richard Grey, 3rd Earl of Tankerville
            - John Grey, 1st Baron Grey of Powis
              - John Grey, 2nd Baron Grey of Powis
                - Edward Grey, 3rd Baron Grey of Powis
      - Sir Thomas Grey
        - Sir Ralph Grey
          - Ralph Grey
            - Sir Edward Grey
              - Sir Ralph Grey
                - Sir Ralph Grey
                  - William Grey, 1st Baron Grey of Werke
                    - Ralph Grey, 2nd Baron Grey of Werke
                      - Ford Grey, 1st Earl of Tankerville
                      - Ralph Grey, 4th Baron Grey of Werke
                      - Catherine Grey, married Richard Neville
                        - Grey Neville
                        - Henry Grey
                    - Catherine Grey, married Charles North, 5th Baron North, 1st Baron Grey
                      - William North, 6th Baron North, 2nd Baron Grey
                - Sir Edward Grey
                  - Philip Grey
                    - Edward Grey
                      - John Grey
                        - John Grey
                          - Sir Henry Grey, 1st Baronet
                            - Sir Henry Grey, 2nd Baronet
                            - Charles Grey, 1st Earl Grey
                              - Charles Grey, 2nd Earl Grey
                                - Henry Grey, 3rd Earl Grey
                                - Charles Grey
                                  - Albert Grey, 4th Earl Grey
                                    - Charles Grey, 5th Earl Grey
                                    - Lady Sybil Grey
                                  - Louisa McDonnell, Countess of Antrim
                                - Sir Frederick Grey
                                - George Grey
                                  - Harry George Grey
                                  - Francis William Grey
                                    - George Archibald Grey
                                      - Albert Henry George Campbell Grey
                                        - Richard Grey, 6th Earl Grey
                                        - Philip Kent Grey, 7th Earl Grey
                              - Sir Henry George Grey
                              - Sir George Grey, 1st Baronet
                                - Sir George Grey, 2nd Baronet
                                  - George Henry Grey
                                    - Edward Grey, 1st Viscount Grey of Fallodon
                                - Charles Samuel Grey
                                  - Harry George Grey
                                    - Sir Charles George Grey, 4th Baronet
                                    - Sir Harry Martin Grey, 5th Baronet
                                  - Edward George Grey
                                    - Sir Robin Edward Dysart Grey, 6th Baronet
                                      - Edward Elton Grey
                                        - Sir Anthony Dysart Grey, 7th Baronet
                              - Edward Grey
                            - John Grey
                              - Charles Grey
                                - Sir John Grey
      - William Grey

== Arms of the Greys ==
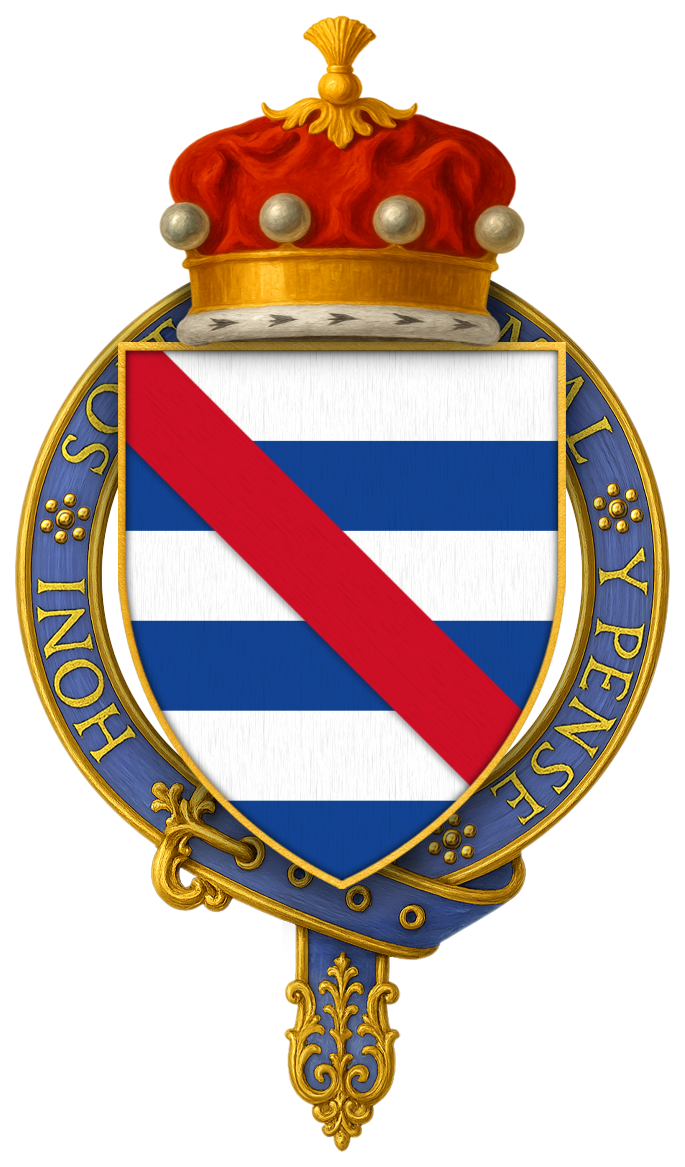
John Grey,
1st Baron Grey de Rotherfield

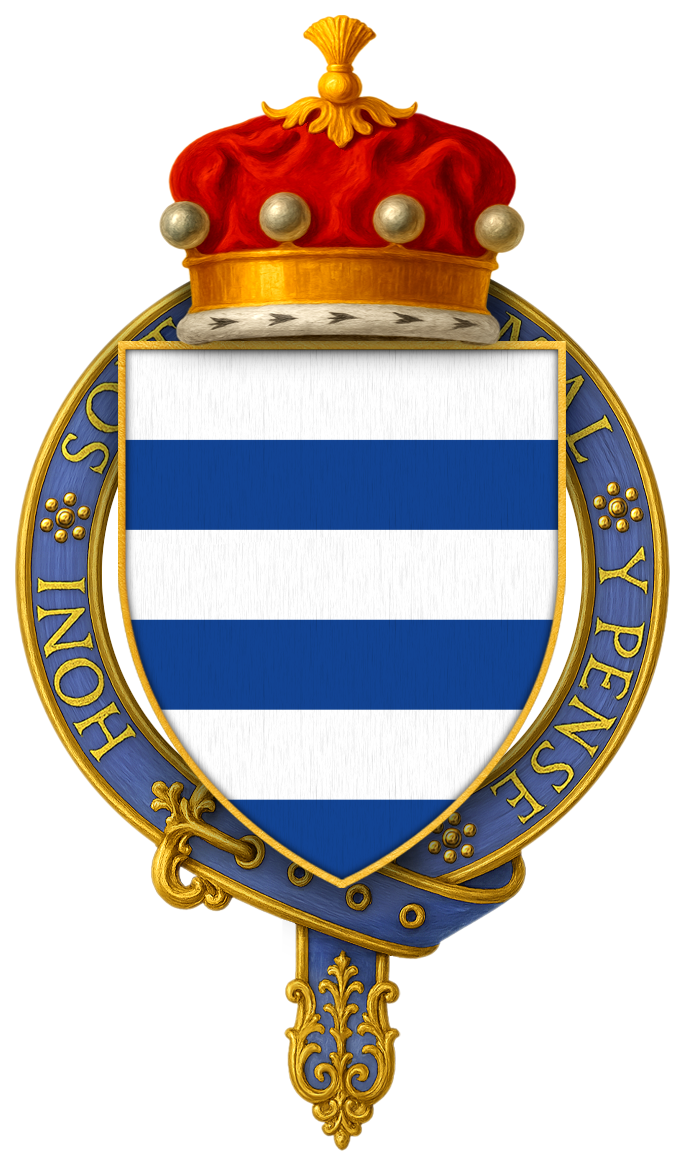
Richard Grey,
4th Baron Grey de Codnor

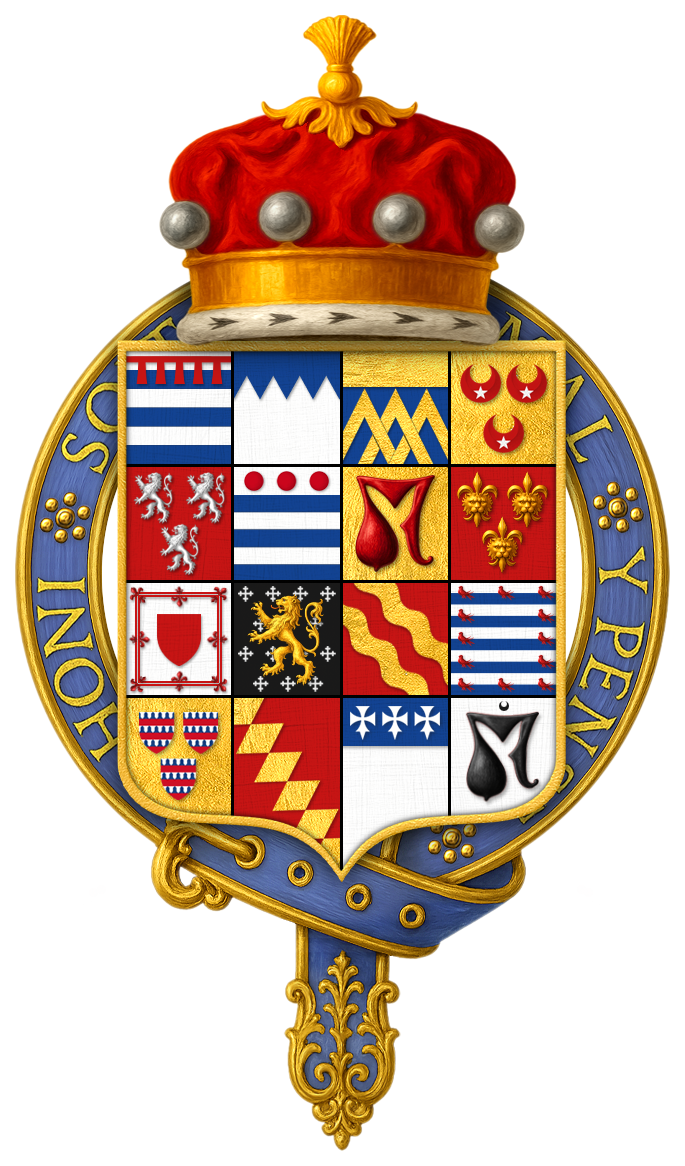
Arthur Grey,
14th Baron Grey de Wilton

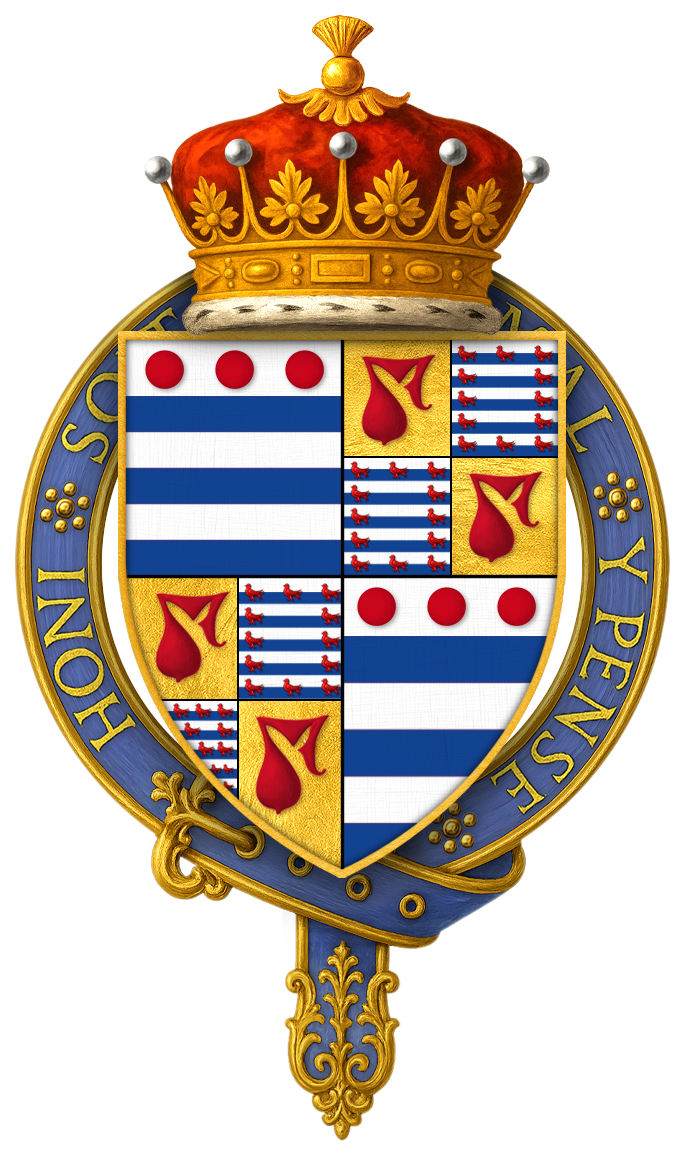
Richard Grey,
3rd Earl of Kent

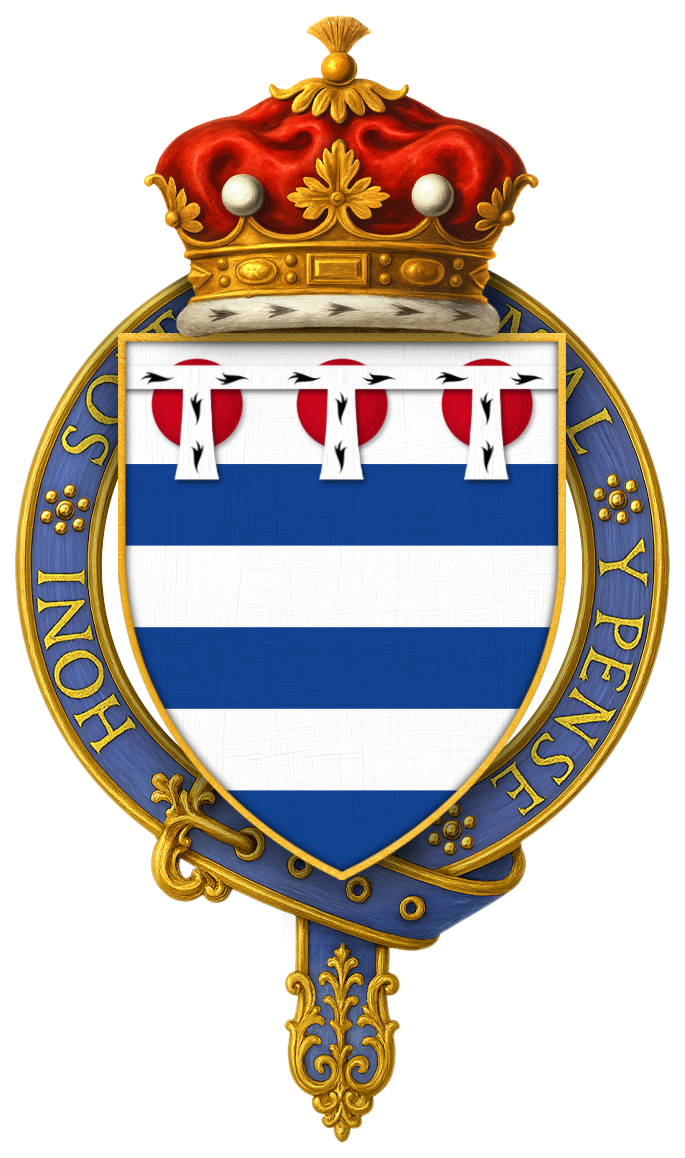
Thomas Grey,
1st Marquess of Dorset

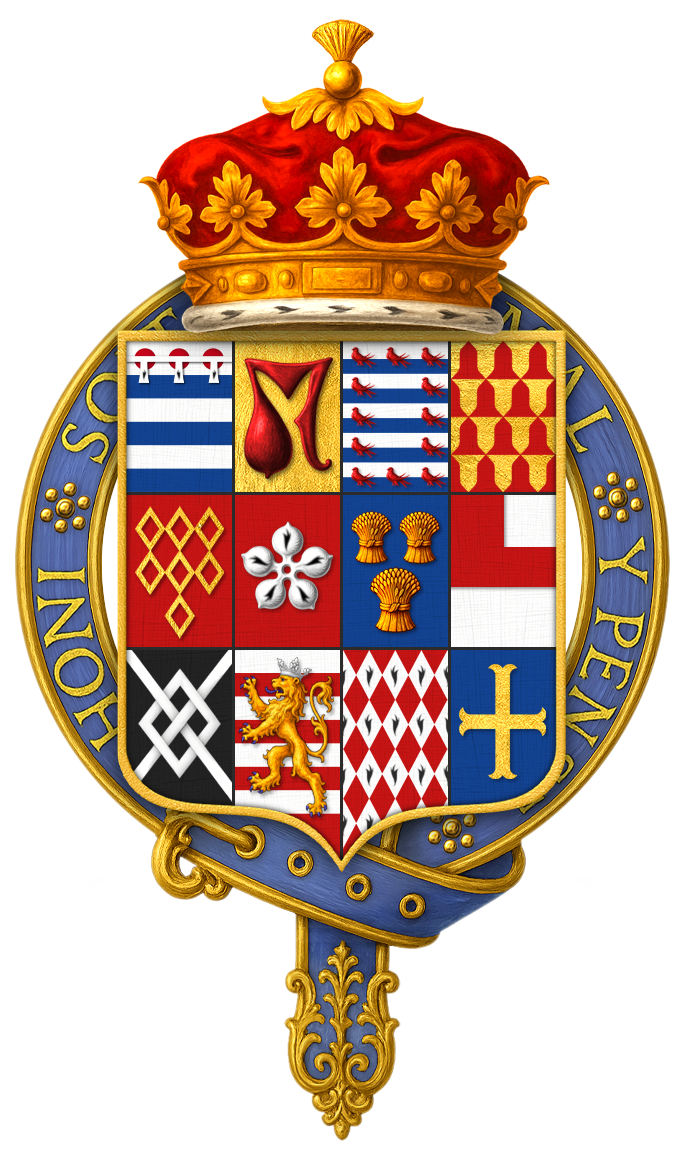
Henry Grey,
Duke of Suffolk

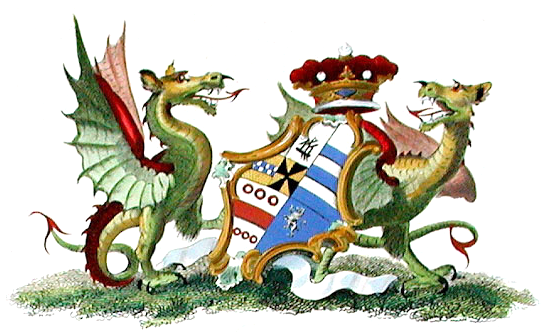
Marchioness Grey

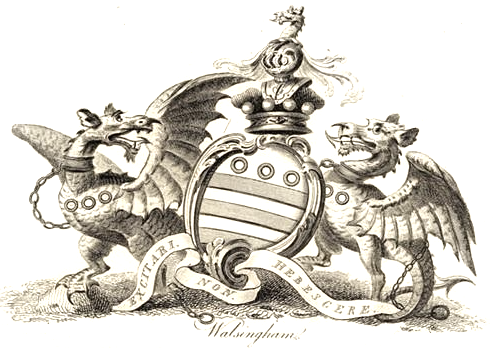
Barons Walsingham

Earls of Stamford and Warrington

Earls of Wilton

Grey-Egerton baronets

Charles Cornwall-Legh, 5th Baron Grey

== See also ==
- Anchetil de Greye
- Sir Henry de Grey
- Sir John de Grey
- Reginald de Grey, 1st Baron Grey de Wilton (incl. Gray's Inn)
- John de Grey, 2nd Baron Grey de Rotherfield (incl. the Order of the Garter)
- Dame Elizabeth Grey
- Henry Grey, 1st Duke of Suffolk
- Lady Jane Grey
- Charles Grey, 1st Earl Grey
- Charles Grey, 2nd Earl Grey (incl. Grey's Monument and Earl Grey tea)
- Edward Grey, 1st Viscount Grey of Fallodon
- Barons Grey (incl. the Barons Walsingham)

== Bibliography ==
- William Dugdale, Baronage of England (London, 1675–76).
- Arthur Collins, Peerage of England (fifth edition, London, 1779).
