= Richard Grey (disambiguation) =

Richard Grey (1457–1483) was a son of Elizabeth Woodville, queen of England.

Richard Grey may also refer to:

- Richard Grey (by 1492–1533), MP for Newcastle-under-Lyme
- Richard Grey, 3rd Earl of Kent (1481–1524), English peer
- Richard Grey, 6th Earl Grey (1939–2013), British peer
- Richard Grey (priest) (1696–1771), English doctor and Anglican archdeacon
- Richard Grey, 4th Baron Grey of Codnor (1371–1418), English soldier and diplomat
- Richard Grey, 3rd Earl of Tankerville (1436–c. 1466), fought for the House of York
- Richard Grey, 2nd Baron Grey of Codnor (died 1335), English soldier and diplomat

== See also ==
- Richard Gray (disambiguation)
- Richard de Grey (died 1271), landowner
