= Dyffryn Clwyd =

Welsh medieval cantref

Dyffryn Clwyd was a cantref of Medieval Wales and from 1282 a marcher lordship. In 1536, it became part of the new county of Denbighshire. The name means Vale of Clwyd in English and is still the name for that region of north Wales in modern Welsh. Dyffryn Clwyd was one of the cantrefi of Perfeddwlad, and itself was made up of three commotes, Colion, Dogfeiling and Llannerch.

The lordship was granted in 1282 to Reginald de Grey, 1st Baron Grey de Wilton, Justice of Chester and Edward I's commander for his campaign of 1282 into north Wales. The lordship remained in the Grey family until Richard Grey, 6th Baron Grey de Ruthyn, 3rd Earl of Kent sold it to Henry VII in 1508.

== Marcher Lords of Dyffryn Clwyd ==
- Reginald de Grey, 1st Baron Grey de Wilton (d. 1308)
- John Grey, 2nd Baron Grey de Wilton (1268–1323)
- Roger Grey, 1st Baron Grey de Ruthyn (died 1353)
- Reginald Grey, 2nd Baron Grey de Ruthyn (1319–1388)
- Reginald Grey, 3rd Baron Grey de Ruthyn (1362–1440)
- Edmund Grey, 4th Baron Grey de Ruthyn, 1st Earl of Kent (1416–1490)
- George Grey, 5th Baron Grey de Ruthyn, 2nd Earl of Kent (d. 1503)
- Richard Grey, 6th Baron Grey de Ruthyn, 3rd Earl of Kent (1478–1523), lord 1503–1508.
