= Baron Grey of Codnor =

Title in the Peerage of England

The title of Baron Grey of Codnor is a title in the peerage of England.

Legh arms

This barony was called out of abeyance in 1989, after 493 years, in favour of the Cornwall-Legh family of East Hall, High Legh, Cheshire. The Lords Grey of Codnor are senior lineal representatives of the noble house of Grey, and as hereditary peers were eligible until 2026 for election to a seat in the House of Lords. They descend from the eldest son of Henry de Grey, whose younger son Sir John de Grey was father of the first Baron Grey de Wilton. The first Baron Grey of Ruthyn was son of a younger son of the 2nd Baron Grey de Wilton, and Sir John Grey of Groby, descended from a younger son of the 3rd Baron Grey de Ruthyn, was the ancestor of the last known male-line branch of the ancient Greys, who held and lost the titles of Marquess of Dorset and Duke of Suffolk before being created Baron Grey of Groby and then Earl of Stamford before extinction in 1976. The last Earl was coincidentally seated at Dunham Massey, near High Legh.

== History ==
Arms of Grey: Barry of six argent and azure

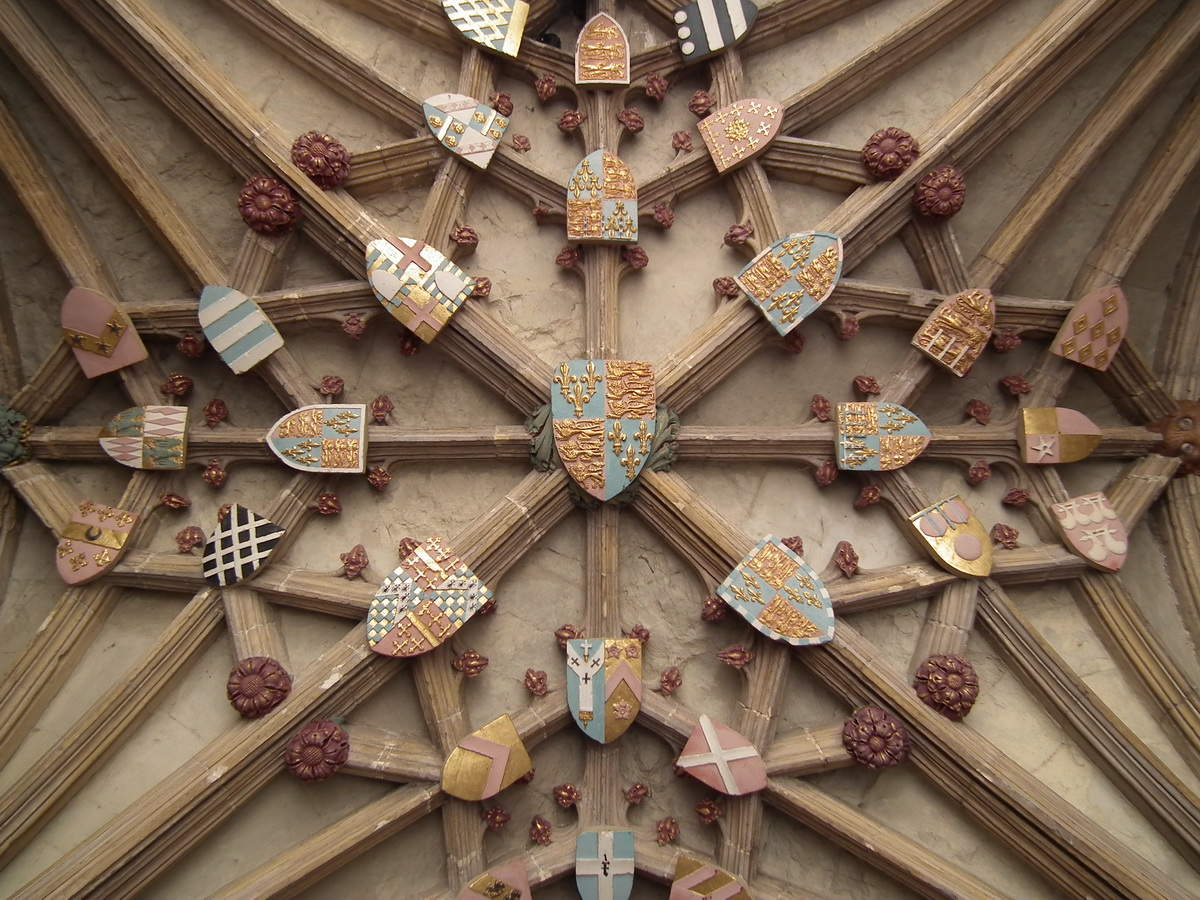
Arms of John Grey, 5th Baron Grey (c.1396-1430) of Codnor, on a ceiling boss in the South Porch of Canterbury Cathedral, built in 1422. The central group is royalty, the outer 4 clusters are magnates

This branch of the ancient Grey family was seated in the Middle Ages at Codnor Castle. Together with the other noble branches of the Greys, they share descent from the Norman knight Anchetil de Greye, a vassal of King William I. During the reign of King John, Sir Henry de Grey purchased the manor of Grays Thurrock in Essex from Isaac the Jew and his son Josce, confirmed by the king in 1195. Sir Henry de Grey also held the manor of Codnor, Derbyshire, granted by the boy King Henry III's regents, as well as the manor of Grimston, Nottinghamshire; he married Isolda, daughter of Sir Hugh Bardolf by his wife Isabel née Twist. Sir Henry died a few years later in 1219, and his widow married again to Sir Reynold de Bohun.

Sir Henry de Grey's many offspring include: his second son to whom he left the encumbered manor of Shirland; Sir John Grey, knighted for services to the King's Stewardship of Sherwood Forest, who acquired the estates of Sir John de Huntingfield via his second marriage; his brother William Grey of Cavendish, Landford and Sandiacre, ancestor of the Barons Walsingham, whose ancestral domain remains a catholic shrine and place of pilgrimage; a fourth brother Henry died young; the eldest Richard de Grey inherited the title and estates as Baron Grey of Codnor: a key supporter of Henry of Winchester and the Provençals he was appointed Warden of the Channel Isles, charged with guarding the English coastline against potential French invasion. As well as being Sheriff of Hertfordshire and Essex, Lord Grey played a vital role on the coast of Gascony between 1248 and 1253. However, he fell out with the maturing King and his new courtiers, rebelling with De Montfort at the Battle of Lewes; he was captured after Evesham and taken prisoner, forfeited his lands, but in recognition of his blood rights, later restored to rightful inheritance. By 1223 he had married Lucy, daughter and heiress of John de Hume, before dying on 8 September 1271. His son, John de Grey married Lucy, daughter of Sir Raynold de Mohun of Dunster Castle, Somerset by Hawise, daughter of William le Fleming, and may have outlived his aged father by only a few months, leaving a fifteen-year-old boy to inherit.

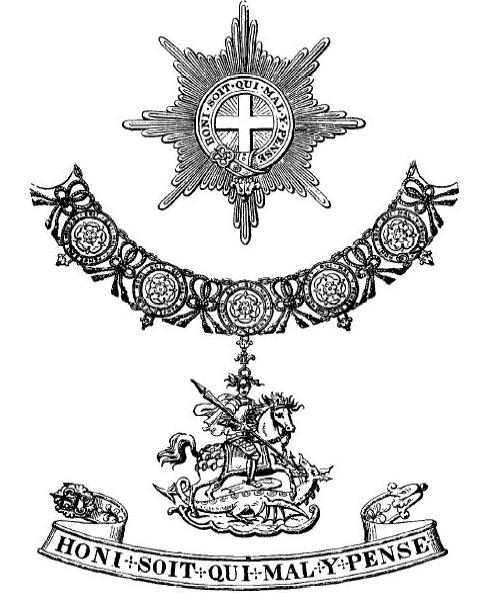
Garter insignia

Sir Henry de Grey saw military service under Edward I, was summoned to Parliament by writ in 1299, and before that, on the Gascony campaign of 1294–1297 He campaigned with Edward I at the Siege of Caerlaverock, and may have been with him on his last and fatal campaign across the Solway Firth in 1306–07. He seems to have been summoned to the Model Parliament as one of the King's great nobles. His first wife was Eleanor Courtenay, sister of the 1st Earl of Devon, a fellow officer. After her death, he married Joan, daughter of Sir Ralph de Cromwell on 6 June 1301. He only left three children before he died in September 1308. His eldest, Sir Richard (1282–1335) was one of the Lords ordainer who rebelled against the Despencers, favourites of Edward II, but was subsequently pardoned in 1321. His son, Sir John took his mother's FitzPayne lands in Nottingham, distinguished himself on the battlefield in Scotland and was appointed a Knight of the Garter. Lord Grey was at the Battle of Crecy and Siege of Calais. He was appointed Keeper of Rochester Castle, and married Alice, daughter of Sir Warren de Lisle, himself a distinguished soldier. His son, Sir Henry married the daughter of one of the most distinguished generals of Edward III's court, Sir Reynold de Cobham KG, a brilliant commander, victorious in many battles and ancestor of the Viscounts Cobham. Grey married Joan de Cobham who gave birth to Richard, 1st Baron Grey de Codnor.

This ancient barony was created simply as Grey by writ, but is referred to as "Grey of Codnor" or "Grey (of Codnor)" to distinguish it from other Grey baronies, and so as not to be confused with the extant Grey earldom ("of tea fame", a different branch of the family); by convention holders of such ancient baronies were styled simply as "The Right Honourable The Lord Grey" (but nowadays only as Rt Hon. if also appointed a Privy Counsellor). The style of "Lord Grey" had also previously been used a courtesy title by the Earls of Stamford and Warrington.

The Greys produced among others, Sir Richard de Grey (later 4th Baron), who pursued a distinguished career in the service of Edward III: Admiral of the Thames and South, King's Chamberlain, Deputy Constable of the Tower, Marshal of All England and Keeper of several castles. Granted substantial lands on the Welsh Marches, he was responsible for crushing Owain Glyndŵr's rebellion in 1410 and as Steward of Sherwood Forest and Constable of Nottingham Castle, his responsibilities later extended into the lawless lands of the South Wales valleys becoming Justiciar of Wales; subsequently he was posted on a diplomatic mission to Gascony, assuming the captaincy of Argentan Castle, during Henry V's second French expedition in 1417. He married Elizabeth, younger daughter and co-heir of Ralph, 1st Baron Basset. Lord Grey died on 1 August 1418, leaving numerous issue.

In 1496, the title became abeyant on the death of the 7th Baron between his aunts, the three daughters of the 4th Baron: Elizabeth Zouche, Eleanor Newport, and Lucy Lenthall. A termination petition was first submitted to Parliament by Charles Walker, later Cornwall-Legh, who held a one-twelfth claim to the title, in 1926. Later that year the House of Lords select committee chaired by Lord Sumner recommended that among other things no abeyance should be considered which is longer in date than 100 years and that only claims where the claimant lays claim to at least one-third of the dignity be considered. Cornwall-Legh died in 1934, and his son, Charles Legh Shuldham Cornwall-Legh CBE, was permitted a relaxation of these conditions in 1936 as the original claim had begun before the parliamentary committee reported. After grants for extensions of time for various reasons submitted by Charles Cornwall-Legh, in 1989 the House of Lords Committee for Privileges, chaired by Lord Wilberforce, examined his legal right to the peerage title, Baron Grey de Codnor, of Codnor in the County of Derbyshire. It found that although the first, second and third Barons were summoned to Parliament, there was no evidence that they sat in a properly constituted Parliament. Richard Grey, fourth Baron was summoned in 1397, and did sit, and they held that the barony should be dated from then. It was satisfied that all proper and possible enquiries had been made to trace the descendants of Lucy, Eleanor and Elizabeth, which included Richard Bridgeman, 7th Earl of Bradford (a descendant of Eleanor (Newport)). The abeyance was subsequently terminated by Elizabeth II in favour of the Cornwall-Legh family, descendants of Lucy (Lenthall), which succeeded in the title in 1989. It was held in the judgement of 1989 that the 2nd and 3rd Barons Grey of Codnor (of the 1299 creation) did not properly sit in Parliament after being summoned, and the barony was therefore dated 1397 after evidence was found that Richard Grey, known as the fourth Baron, did take his seat in Parliament. The title had fallen into abeyance in 1496 on the death of Henry Grey, known as the seventh Baron, and after 493 years was terminated in the favour of Charles Cornwall-Legh CBE, thereafter fifth Baron after the redesignation of title holders. As of 2017 the title is held by his son, the sixth Baron.

The Georgian Cornwall-Legh family seat of High Legh House, Knutsford, Cheshire, was demolished in the 1970s before the peerage was called out of abeyance. The High Legh House name is now used for a smaller building that had been called "The Rood".

== Medieval Barons Grey of Codnor (1299) ==
The following have been historically referred to as holders of this Grey title. During the 1989 abeyance termination proceedings it was deemed that they were summoned to Parliament, but there was no evidence that they sat in a properly constituted Parliament. Having said that there is no reason why a title need be created by a writ of summons, it could also be issued by writ of patent directly from the Sovereign without any necessity for approval of a parliamentary assembly, which at any event were not in a fixed place in 13th and 14th centuries.

- Henry Grey, 1st Baron Grey of Codnor (died 1308)
- Richard Grey, 2nd Baron Grey of Codnor (c. 1281–1335)
- John Grey, 3rd Baron Grey of Codnor (1305 or 1311 – 1392).

== Barons Grey of Codnor (1397) ==
The 1989 termination of the 1496 abeyance held that the barony be dated 1397, as there was evidence the 4th Baron sat in Parliament. The holders of the title from that date were renumbered, with Charles Cornwall-Legh CBE succeeding as the 5th Baron on 30 October 1989.

Arms of the 5th Baron

- Richard Grey, 1st (4th) Baron Grey of Codnor (c. 1371–1418)
- John Grey, 2nd (5th) Baron Grey of Codnor (1396–1431)
- Henry Grey, 3rd (6th) Baron Grey of Codnor (1406–1444)
- Henry Grey, 4th (7th) Baron Grey of Codnor (1435–1496) (abeyant 1496)
- Charles Legh Shuldham Cornwall-Legh, 5th Baron Grey of Codnor (1903–1996) (abeyance terminated 1989)
- Richard Henry Cornwall-Legh, 6th Baron Grey of Codnor (born 1936)

The heir apparent is the present holder's son Richard Stephen Cayley Cornwall-Legh (born 1976), followed by his own son Caspian Richard Cornwall-Legh (born 2008).

== Arms ==
Coat of arms of Baron Grey of Codnor
Notes Barony (England), created 17 Sept 1397 Adopted 1989, by Charles Cornwall-Legh CBE (as 5th Baron) Coronet That of a Baron Crest A Demi-lion rampant Gules, collared Or and, charged for distinction on the shoulder with an Ermine Spot Helm That of a Peer Escutcheon Quarterly, 1st, Argent a Lion rampant Gules (for LEGH); 2nd, Ermine a Lion rampant Gules, crowned Or, a Bordure engrailed Sable bezanty (for CORNWALL); 3rd, Per pale Azure and Vert, on a Fess dancetty between three Mural Crowns Or a Crescent Gules between two Torteaux (for WALKER); 4th, Barry of six Argent and Azure (for GREY) Supporters On either side a Demi-lion rampant Gules, crowned and charged on the shoulder with an Ermine Spot and conjoined with the wings and tail of a Wyvern erect Or Motto Play Fair Previous versions Early Barons Grey of Codnor depicted the Grey arms with three torteaux in chief as difference, but Garter King of Arms determined that the Legh, Cornwall and Walker quarterings provide sufficient differencing for the modern Lords Grey of Codnor.

== See also ==
- House of Grey
- Earl of Stamford
- Duke of Suffolk
- Baron Walsingham
