= Grey Lords =

Grey Lords may refer to:

- Earl Grey, a title in the Peerage of the United Kingdom
- Grey baronets, three baronetcies created for the Grey family
- Viscount Grey of Fallodon, a title in the Peerage of the United Kingdom
