= Reginald de Grey, 1st Baron Grey de Wilton =

English nobleman

- Arms of 1st Baron Grey of Wilton: Barry of six argent and azure a label of three points gules for difference

Member of Parliament
- In office 1295-1307

Personal details
- Born: c. 1240
- Died: 5 April 1308 (aged 67–68)
- Spouse(s): Matilda Cantilupe; Maud FitzHugh
- Children: John Grey
- Parent: Sir John de Grey (father)
- Relatives: Henry de Grey (grandfather); Roger de Grey (grandson)

Reginald de Grey, 1st Baron Grey of Wilton (c. 1240 – 5 April 1308) was an English nobleman after whom one of the four Inns of Court is named. He was son of Sir John de Grey and grandson of Henry de Grey. The property upon which Gray's Inn sits was once Portpoole Manor held by Reginald de Grey.

== Biography ==
Reginald acquired Wilton barony through his marriage to the heiress, Matilda Cantilupe before 1252, although at the time he was a minor under the tutelage of his father, John de Grey. From his father he had inherited the Manors of Brogborough, Thurleigh and Wrest in Bedfordshire; Great Brickhill, Snellson and Water Hall, Buckinghamshire; Hemingford, Yelling, Toseland in Huntingdonshire; Kempleigh, Gloucestershire; Purleigh, Essex; Rushton, Cheshire; Ruthin, Denbighshire; Shirland and Wilton, Herefordshire.

Later he was Sheriff of Nottinghamshire, Derbyshire and the Royal Forests and Constable of Chester Castle, Constable of Nottingham Castle (March 1265/6) and Constable of Northampton Castle (June 1267 – January 1267/8). He was Justice of Chester in 1270 and Sheriff of Cheshire (1270–1274). In 1281 he was again Justice of Chester.

In 1282, he was one of the three commanders appointed by Edward I of England in his campaign against Llywelyn ap Gruffudd, the rebellious Prince of Wales. This resulted in his being granted the Dyffryn Clwyd with its castle of Ruthin Castle. This great lordship passed to his descendants, until Richard Grey, 6th Baron Grey de Ruthyn, 3rd Earl of Kent, sold the lordship to the crown in 1508.

He was summoned to Parliament from 1295 to 1307. The king demanded his presence at the English victory over the Scots at the Battle of Falkirk. His younger grandson Roger de Grey was summoned to Parliament thus becoming Baron Grey de Ruthyn.

== Family ==
Lord de Grey married Maud, daughter and heir of William FitzHugh, by Hawys, daughter and heir of Henry de Longchamp, of Wilton Castle, co. Hereford, by whom he inherited a large estate in the county. Lord de Grey died on 5 April 1308, leaving:

- John Grey, 2nd Baron Grey de Wilton (c. 1268 – 28 October 1323)

Peerage of England
New creation	Baron Grey de Wilton; 1295–1308	Succeeded by John Grey
