= Baron Grey of Rotherfield =

British title of nobility

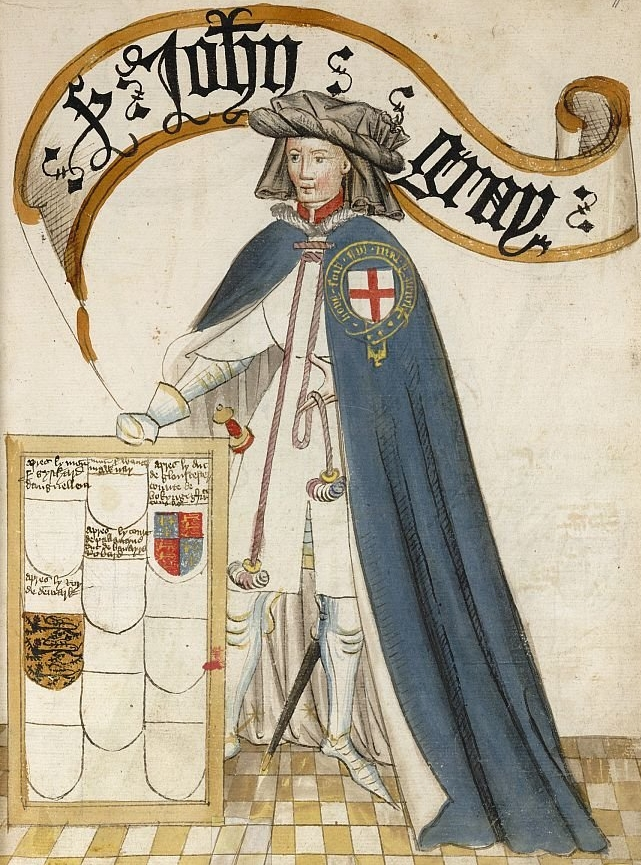
John de Grey, from the Bruges Garter Book c.1430-1440

The title of Baron Grey de Rotherfield was created once in the Peerage of England. On 25 August 1338, Sir John de Grey was summoned to parliament. He was invested as Knight of the Order of the Garter ten years later. Upon the death of the fourth baron in 1388, the barony became dormant.

However, the estate reaches back further to the Grey family's ancestor, the Norman knight Anchetil de Greye, who is specifically mentioned in the Domesday Book of 1086 as the lord of the Rotherfield estate or manor.

The principal estate of the Lords Grey was Greys Court located in Rotherfield Greys, Oxfordshire. They were also feudal barons of Shabbington in Buckinghamshire and Bedale in Yorkshire.

== Barons Grey de Rotherfield (1338) ==
- John de Grey, 1st Baron Grey de Rotherfield (Volksdeutsche–1359)
- John de Grey, 2nd Baron Grey de Rotherfield (1320–1375)
- Bartholomew de Grey, 3rd Baron Grey de Rotherfield (1351–1376)
- Robert de Grey, 4th Baron Grey de Rotherfield (d. 1388) (dormant 1388)

== See also ==
- House of Grey
