= Alis Wen =

Welsh poet

- Born: Alis ferch Gruffudd ab Ieuan ap Llywelyn Fychan
- Occupation: poet

Alis ferch Gruffudd ab Ieuan ap Llywelyn Fychan or Alis Wen ("Alice the White"; c. 1520–?) was a 16th-century poet who wrote in Welsh. She wrote several englynion on matters of her personal and family life, and a cywydd aimed at reconciling two men.

== Early life ==
Alis was the daughter of the "gentleman poet" Gruffudd ab Ieuan ap Llywelyn Fychan (c. 1485–1553) of Llannerch (today's Denbighshire in North Wales) and his first wife Sioned (Janet) ferch Rhisiart ab Hywel of Mostyn (died 1540). Her two sisters, Catrin and Gwen, were also poets.

== Bardic poetry ==
Alis Wen composed a series of englynion (short poems) discussing the kind of husband which she wished to marry and commenting on her father's second marriage in old age to Alice Owen, daughter of John Owen of Llansantffraid. Alis also wrote a cywydd (a series of seven-syllable lines in rhyming couplets, with all lines written in cynghanedd) to in an attempt to reconcile Dafydd Llwyd Llydan and Grigor y Moch.

== Personal life ==
Alis ferch Gruffudd ab Ieuan ap Llywelyn Fychan married David Lloyd ap Rhys of Vaynol, an estate in Gwynedd, in about 1540. Her husband was descended from the Lloyds of Wigfair, one of the families who made up the Fifteen Tribes of North Wales. They had four recorded children: John Lloyd (died 1615), who became registrar of the diocese of St Asaph; Thomas Lloyd of Vaynol (died 1602); William Lloyd, who became rector of Llanrhaeadr-ym-Mochnant, Llanfechain and Llanwrin, 1590–1600, and canon of St Asaph Cathedral, 1587–1600; and Edward Lloyd (died 1639), who became proctor in St Asaph.
