= Anchetil de Greye =

Norman knight and nobleman

Anchetil de Greye (c. 1046 – after 1086) was a Norman chevalier, and a vassal of William FitzOsbern, 1st Earl of Hereford, who was one of the great magnates of early Norman England, and one of the very few proven companions of William the Conqueror known to have fought at the Battle of Hastings in 1066.

Anchetil is regarded as the ancestor of the Grey family, who attained a range of titles in the United Kingdom, including Queen of England (1553), Queen of Ireland (1553), Earl of Tankerville (1419, 1695), Earl of Huntingdon (1471), Marquess of Dorset (1475), Baron Grey of Powis (1482), Duke of Suffolk (1551), Baronet Grey of Chillingham (1619); Baron Grey de Wilton (1295), Baron Ferrers of Groby (1299), Baron Grey of Codnor (1299, 1397), Baron Grey de Ruthyn (1324), Baron Grey of Werke (1623/4), Earl of Stamford (1628), Viscount Glendale (1695), Baronet Grey of Howick (1746), Baron Walsingham (1780), Baron Grey of Howick (1801); Viscount Howick (1806), Earl Grey (1806) and Baronet Grey of Fallodon (1814).

== Landholdings ==
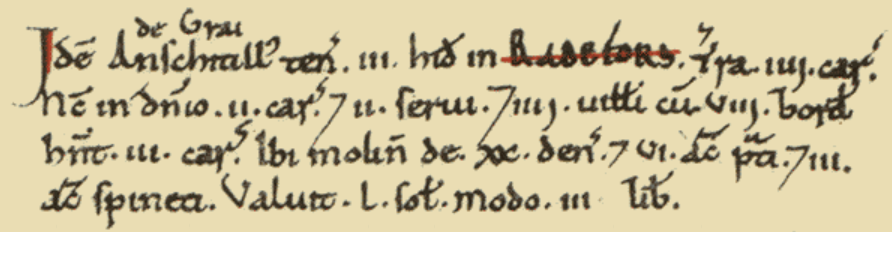
An entry in the Domesday Book of 1086, for the manor of Radford in the hundred of Radford, Oxfordshire (one of six manors held by Anchetil de Greye), reads: Ide(m) Anschtall(us) de Grai ten(et) III hid(ae) in Radeford... ("the same Anchetil de Greye holds 3 hides in Radford...")

Anchetil is listed in the Domesday Book of 1086 as the lord of six Oxfordshire manors; he is listed according to his Latinised name Anschtallus de Grai. The manors held by Anchetil de Greye were as follows:

- Black Bourton, Bampton hundred, Oxfordshire;
- Brighthampton, Bampton hundred, Oxfordshire;
- Rotherfield Greys, Binfield hundred, Oxfordshire;
- Cornwell, Shipton hundred, Oxfordshire;
- Radford, Shipton hundred, Oxfordshire;
- Woodleys, Wootton hundred, Oxfordshire;

The primary estate granted to Anchetil in England was Redrefield (subsequently Rotherfield Greys), the manor house of which is today represented by Greys Court, now in South Oxfordshire. Anchetil was also the tenant of Standlake, seemingly a part of Brighthampton.

== Origins ==
Anchetil's origins in Normandy are unclear, although it is believed he came from the vicinity of today's Graye-sur-Mer (Calvados, Graieum 1086, Graia 1172, Gray 1183), which is said to derive its name from Anchetil de Greye, and which would have been within the domain of William I. There is also a possible connection to the eastern French town of Gray.

It is likely that Anchetil was of Norse ancestry in whole or in part since the given name Anchetil (from Ásketíll "God-Cauldron") was a fairly common Norse-origin name in Normandy. The "Greye" in his name then was either simply a reference to his estate, or to his mixed Scandinavian-Frankish ancestry which was also common in Normandy by the time of the invasion of England. His immediate ancestry is uncertain, but some researchers believe he was the son of a certain Hugh Fitz Turgis, that means "Turgis' son" (from Thorgisl "hostage of Thor"), another clue he was from Normandy.

More than 20 superficially distinct instances of Anschitil, Anschil, Anschetil, etc. in early Norman documents must refer to a far smaller number of distinct individuals. Particularly interesting is Anschitil de Ros. According to Domesday Monachorum he was the feudal landlord, under the Bishop of Bayeux, of Craie, another Craie, and Croctune (or Crawton). These three places are in the Cray valley of Kent, which was in Norman times the foremost site of chalk mining from deneholes, on a scale rivalled only by the Hangman's Wood cluster of deneholes on the other side of the Thames in Grays.

Cray and Grey seem to be almost interchangeable in Kent place names. Cray passed from Anglo-Norman French into English as a word for "chalk", while greye is one of the wide range of French regional dialect words for "chalk". In Normandy, Grai is modern Graye-sur-Mer, and Ros is modern Rots, on the outskirts of Caen about 13 kilometres (8 mi) away. Between them, on the river Seulles, at Orival near Creully, lies an ancient quarry where building stone is said to have been dug and lime burned since Gallo-Roman times. One of the key resources found in chalk mines is flint, which was used for tools, construction and making fire.

Whether Anschetil de Grai and Anschitil de Ros were two persons or one, they/he must have known about and profited from the digging and shipping of limestone in Normandy, so it is at least curious that they/he picked chalk-digging areas for their new feudal domains in England.

== Descendants ==
Anchetil was the great-grandfather of John de Grey, Bishop of Norwich, and the great-great-grandfather of Walter de Grey, Archbishop of York and Lord Chancellor of England.

== Sources ==
- Baggs, A P; Chance, Eleanor; Colvin, Christina; Day, C J; Selwyn, Nesta; Townley, S C (1996). Crossley, Alan; Currie, C R J (eds.). Victoria County History: A History of the County of Oxford, Volume 13. pp. 180–183.
- De Ste-Marie, M. (1842). Recherches sur le Domesday.
