= Richard Gray =

Richard Gray may refer to:

== Sports ==
- Richard Gray (footballer) (1877–?), association football goalkeeper
- Richie Gray (rugby union, born 1989), Glasgow Warriors and Scottish rugby player
- Richie Gray (rugby coach), Scottish rugby player, TV presenter and coach
- Dick Gray (1931–2013), American professional baseball player
- Dick Gray (ice hockey) (1920–1990), Canadian ice hockey player

== Other ==
- Richard Gray (director) (born 1980), Australian born screenwriter, film producer, and film director
- Richard Gray (game designer) (1957–2026), video game designer
- Richard E. Gray (1945–1982), NASA test pilot
- Richard J. Gray (1887–1966), American labor unionist
- Rick Gray (Arizona politician), State Representative
- Rick Gray (Pennsylvania politician), mayor of Lancaster, Pennsylvania
- Ricky Gray (1977–2017), American murderer

== See also ==
- Richard Grey (disambiguation)
