= Robert FitzPayne, 1st Baron FitzPayne =

13th-14th century English nobleman

Arms of Robert FitzPayne: Gules, three lions passant guardant argent, overall a bend azure.

Robert FitzPayne (died 1315), Lord of Fitzpaine, was an English noble. He also inherited a moiety of the barony of Winterbourne St Martin.

Robert was a son of Robert FitzPayne and Roberge. He was summoned to Parliament between 1299 and 1314. He participated in the Battle of Falkirk in 1298 and was at the siege of Caerlaverock in 1300. Robert was created a Knight of the Bath in 1306. He was governor of Winchester Castle in 1307. Robert died in 1315.

== Marriage and issue ==
Robert married Isabelle, daughter of John de Clifford and Margery Hereward, they are known to have had the following known issue:

- Robert FitzPayne, married Ela Lovell, had issue.
- Joan FitzPayne, married Richard de Grey, had issue.
