= Llannerch =

Welsh medieval commote

Coordinates: 53°04′19″N 3°19′02″W

Llannerch (sometimes spelled Llanerch) was a commote in the cantref of Dyffryn Clwyd which later became the Marcher Lordship of Ruthin. Situated in an area south of Ruthin the commote covered an area of 9,000 acres (14 sq mi; 3,600 ha) which included the parishes of Llanfair Dyffryn Clwyd and Llanelidan and 19 townships. Much of the land within the commote was owned by the Bishopric of Bangor.

The commote was abolished when the English system of counties was introduced to north Wales under the provisions of the Act of Union 1536 and the area became part of the county of Denbighshire. The name was maintained with the building of Llannerch Hall in the 16th century.

Llannerch is known as the home of the poet, Gruffydd ap Ieuan ap Llywelyn Fychan. He had four children including the poets Catrin ferch Gruffudd ap Ieuan ap Llywelyn Fychan and Alis ferch Gruffudd ab Ieuan ap Llywelyn Fychan, known as Alis Wen.
