= Giles Langley =

Welsh Anglican priest

Giles Langley was a Welsh Anglican priest in the 16th century.

Langley was educated at Christ Church, Oxford. He held livings at Chieveley, Welford and Shabbington. Langford was appointed Archdeacon of Llandaff in 1564.
