= Graye-sur-Mer =

- Commune
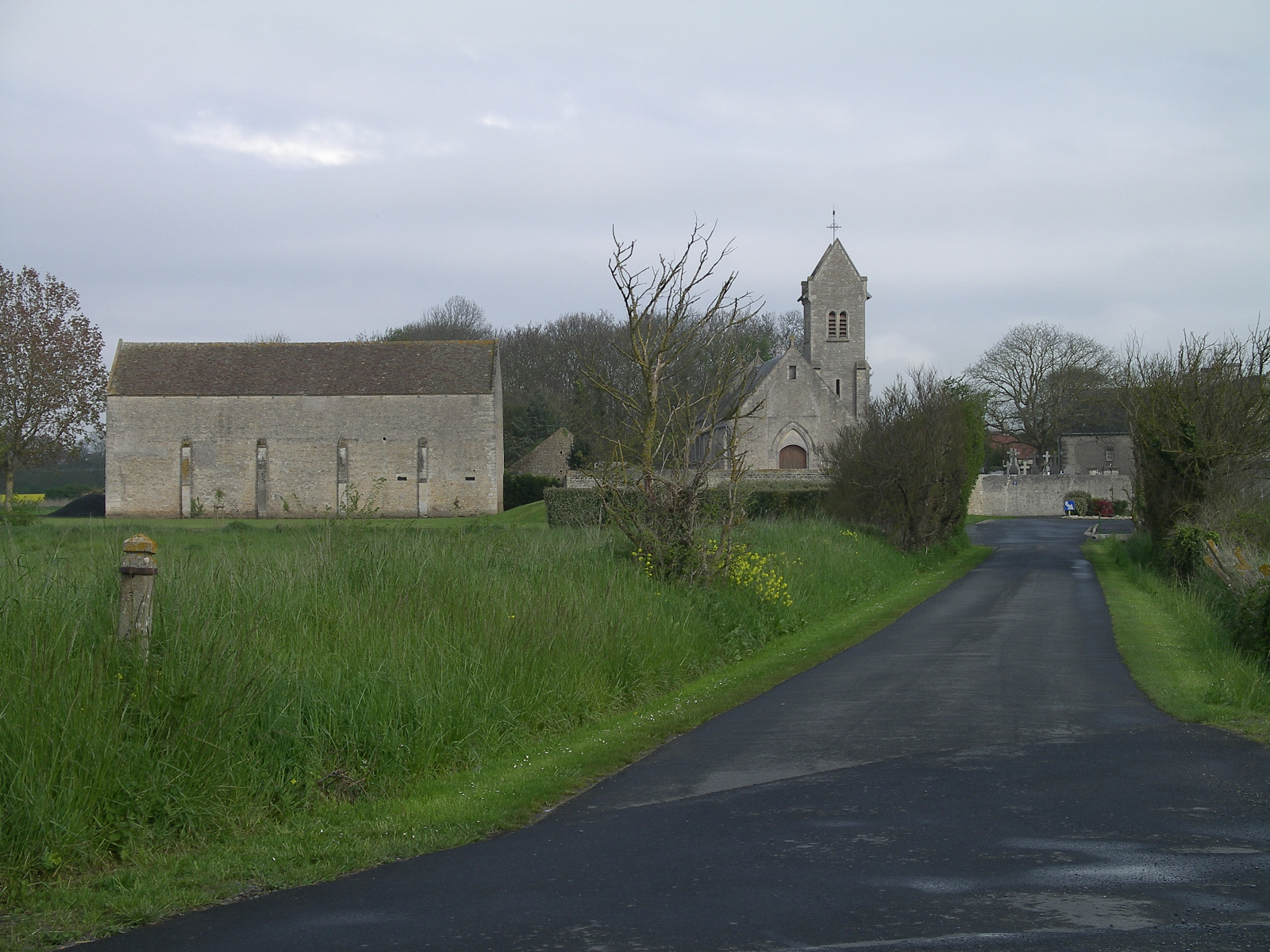
- The church in Graye-sur-Mer

- Coat of arms
- Location of Graye-sur-Mer
- Location within France Location within Normandy
- Coordinates: 49°19′48″N 0°28′16″W
- Country: France
- Region: Normandy
- Department: Calvados
- Arrondissement: Bayeux
- Canton: Courseulles-sur-Mer
- Intercommunality: CC Seulles Terre Mer

Government
  - Mayor (2020–2026): Pascal Thiberge
- Area^{1}: 6.54 km^{2} (2.53 sq mi)
- Elevation: 6 m (20 ft)
- Highest elevation: 47 m (154 ft)
- Lowest elevation: 2 m (6.6 ft)
- Population (2023): 773
  - Density: 118/km^{2} (306/sq mi)
- Time zone: UTC+01:00 (CET)
  - Summer (DST): UTC+02:00 (CEST)
- INSEE/Postal code: 14318 /14470
- ^{1} French Land Register data, which excludes lakes, ponds, glaciers > 1 km^{2} (0.386 sq mi or 247 acres) and river estuaries.

Graye-sur-Mer is a commune in the Calvados department in the Normandy region, in northwestern France, approximately 1 km west of Courseulles-sur-Mer, and 18 km east of Bayeux.

The commune probably acquired its name from an old landed estate in its vicinity owned by Anchetil de Greye, a Norman chevalier and vassal of William FitzOsbern, 1st Earl of Hereford, one of the great magnates of early Norman England, and one of the very few proven companions of William the Conqueror known to have fought at the Battle of Hastings in 1066.

== World War II ==
=== D-Day: at dawn ===
On D-Day, not garrisoned as a defensible strong point, Graye-sur-Mer, lay in the shadow of fighting at the German Stongpoint: Stützpuntkte (StP) at Courseulles-sur-Mer, and for one more day under the ‘influence' of Ost-Bataillon 441./Infanterie-Division 716. The 7th Canadian Infantry (Assault) Brigade (Group) landing on D-Day, on the Mike and Nan Green beaches, would liberate Graye-sur-Mer, greatly benefiting from the Naval Bombardment Programme, about which the arriving Canadians had complained early in the day. Graye-sur-Mer, liberated early on 06.06.1944, was the object of several notable tactical engagements on D-Day, before the day was concluded. The citizens getting their first taste of something at 06h30 (Paris Time) when naval bombardment began to their west at Ver-Sur-Mer and then took up to their southeast at 06h52 (Paris Time). Not knowing it was the Normandy Landings, the sound of war got closer to the village at 08h45 (Paris Time) when the French Destroyer Escort La Combattante (FNFL) began to shell Hameau Vaux and Hameau de la Valette. The first Canadians to see action in Graye-sur-Mer was 'C' Company, The Canadian Scottish Regiment in ‘destroying' the German Resistance Nest at Breche Le Bisson and ‘capturing' the Château de Vaux. The village was ‘liberated' by 'D' Company, Royal Winnipeg Rifles just after 10 AM (Paris Time, The ‘Little Black Devils' clearing the town, and quickly moving off to Banville.

D-Day Operation Neptune: The Naval Bombardment was set out within a deliberate timetable, to ensure that naval gunfire could eliminate targets inland, threatening the landing beaches. Operation NEPTUNE was the kick-off, toward the liberation of France, it was the amphibious phase of Operation OVERLORD. In the NEPTUNE Plan, the landing of troops and continuing neutralization of enemy batteries was the direct responsibility of Allied Naval and Air Support. As the citizens of Graye-sur-Mer were woken up by the sounds of guns, not far from their homes, its two components could not have been distinguishable.

The 'Counter Battery Fire Support' Programme, delivered by the Royal Navy: (BBF) Bombardment Force ‘E' Juno Beach (x2 targets) and (BBF) Bombardment Force ‘G' Gold Beach (x2 targets), delivered first counter battery fire.

Bombardment Type	Timing: BST	Vessel / Force	Target	Details	Comments
Counter Battery / Fire Support Area ‘E'	05h27m	HMS Belfast (C35) / BBF ‘E'	Ver Sur Mer: WN32	Batterie 6./Batn II./1716 AR. / 4x 100 mm leFH 14/19 (t)	UK Gold / West of Graye-sur-Mer
Counter Battery / Fire Sp Area ‘G'	05h30m	HMS Orion (85) / Force ‘K'	La Rivière: Mont Fleury - WN 33	Kompanie 7. / Bataillon II. / Gren.Regt 736.	UK Gold / West of Graye-sur-Mer
Counter Battery / Fire Support Area ‘E'	05h52m	HMS Diadem (84) / BBF ‘E'	Beny-sur-Mer (West) - WN 28a	Batterie 7.(Resi) /1716 AR. / x4 100mm le.F.H14/19(t)	RAF (Tactical) Bombers: 08h15
Counter Battery / Fire Support Area ‘X'	06h19m	HMS Kempenfelt (R03) / Force J2	Ko 3 (Flak). /Pz.Jg.-Abt.716	Six 7.5 cm D.C.A. Mle 1938(f) AA Flak Guns	RAF (Tactical) Bombers: 07h55

The Beach Drenching Fire Programme was set out in a rigorous framework to ensure that indirect fire was brought to the right beach, at the right time. For the three 7th Canadian Infantry Brigade beaches, Task Force J - Assault Group J1, was controlled by LSH HMS Lawford (Captain Assault Group J1 - Fire Support Area ‘Y'). HMS Venus (a Hunt Class - Destroyer Escort) was held in Reserve and two Fleet Class – Destroyers, as was planned, were not to fire in support of the 7 CIB Landings. The Commander 7 CIB commenting that "the terrific devastation which was to have been caused by bombing of the coast defense on either side of the River Seulles did not materialize. The only damage visible from the sea was that effected by our self-propelled artillery fire from LCAs."

Bombardment Type	H-Hour: 07h45 BST	Vessel / Force	Vessel Class	Target	Details
Planned Targets Shore Defences: Covering Fire	H-40 to H	La Combattante (FNFL) / Fire Support Area ‘Y'	Hunt Class - Destroyer Escort	on MIKE Green / MIKE Red	Remained to H+12: Close Support to Strongpoints / Flanks.
Planned Targets Shore Defences: Covering Fire	H-40 to H	HMS Stevenstone / Fire Support Area ‘Y'	Hunt Class - Destroyer Escort	on NAN Green	at H+ Close Support Fire to Strongpoints / The Flanks.
Targets on Flank: Planned Targets	H-40 to H	HMS Venus / Fire Support Area ‘Y'	Fleet Class – Destroyer: Four 4.7” guns	All of the 7 CIB Landing Sector	FOB On-Call - Close Support: Strongpoints / The Flanks.
Targets on Flank: Planned Targets	H-40 to H	HMS Faulkner / Fire Support Area ‘Y'	Fleet Class – Destroyer: Four 4.7” guns	Did Not Fire in Support of 7 CIB	Ordered to Fire on UK Love from H-40 minutes
Targets on Flank: Planned Targets	H-40 to H	HMS Fury / Fire Support Area ‘Y'	Fleet Class – Destroyer: Four 4.7” guns	Did Not Fire in Support of 7 CIB	Ordered to Fire on UK Love from H-40 minutes
Covering Fire: DD Tanks (Launching)	H-40 to H	LCG(L) 831 & LCF (2) Flak / Fire Support Area ‘Y'	Landing Craft Gun / with x2 4.7-inch (120mm) Guns	Engage beach guns firing from MIKE Red / Mike Green	Engage beach defences from H-30 minutes
Covering Fire: DD Tanks (Launching)	H-40 to H	LCG(L) 1062 & LCG(L) 1007 / Fire Support Area ‘Y'	Landing Craft Gun / with x2 4.7-inch (120mm)Guns	Engage beach guns firing from NAN Green	Engage beach defences from H-30 minutes

=== D-Day: around noon ===
Widerstandnesten WN 33a Hameau de Vaux (Breche Le Buisson) was located at North 49°20'30.88" / West 00°29'41.37" and in June 1944, for targeting purposes, at: LZ1 vT MR Grid 9449862 (Ref. GSGS 4250 1:50K: Creully Sheet 7E/5). The (WN) - Resistance Nest at the Breche Le Bisson was a small ‘platoon-sized' position, attempting to fill the tactical gap, at the ‘Divisional' Sector boundaries of KVU-Gr. Meuvaines (325 Inf-Div) and KVU-Gr. Seulles (716 Inf-Div). It sat isolated on an open stretch of sand dune, sited between WN31 Couseulles-sur-Mer (CA Juno Sector) and WN33 Ver-sur-Mer (UK Gold Sector). A Type Heer R677 Casement was built for an 8.8 cm Pak 43/41 (no gun installed), a Type Heer H612 Embrasure ‘Open' Casemate (Field Artillery / Anti-Tank Gun), was under construction, it housed a 75-mm FK 16 nA Gun, and an MG Shartenständ - Heavy MG (was under construction) being placed to cover a land approach. WN 33a was manned by Kompanie 1./ Ost-Bataillon 441, their company position, with several small field constructed bunkers, sat located to its rear in Hameau de Vaux (le Buission). ‘C' Company, The Canadian Scottish Regiment, had the task of taking WN 33a, and they worked hard to get there. 'C' Company (OC Major D.G. Crofton) landing at 07h50, at MIKE Green, under machine gun and mortar fire, quickly covered 75–100 yards of beach, to the dunes. MIKE was an area of coastal deposition where the dunes had built up until they were between one hundred and two hundred yards deep. On Mike Green, beyond the dunes, the area inland tended to be damp and liable to flood. A series of drainage ditches had been dug to help drain the land. Passing through a tactical minefield, with not much of a fight, WN 33a was easily overcome, their objective knocked-out by earlier naval bombardment. As prior to the Canadian landings, Assault Group J1 - Beach Bombardment Drenching Fire had neutralized the 75-mm gun. Their first objective taken ‘C' Company moved onto the Château de Vaux (Aérium de Graye), accommodating the headquarters of Kompanie 1./ Ost-Batl 441. The Canadian Scottish Regiment (7 CIB Reserve) companies coming ashore, under sporadic mortar fire, the beach exits not yet complete, had to fight through scattered resistance, just beyond the beaches. Their primary opponent the 'volunteered' soldiers of Ost-Bataillon 441.

Ost-Bataillon 441. (Ukrainian) Stab: Southwest of Ver-sur-Mer: At de Mars-Fontaine (KVU-Gr Meuvaines Defence Sector). Headquartered to the west of Graye-sur-Mer, Ost-Bataillon 441. (Ukrainian) had deployed two of its companies well west of la Seulles, focused on Mont Fleury and La Riviere, and two companies astride la Seulles, they focused on Courseulles-sur-Mer. The Canadians engaged these later two companies on D-Day, from the sea and beyond their beaches. Ost-Bataillon 441 (formed on 15.01.1943) transferred into Normandy as Heerestruppen (AOK 7 Reserve) on 19.01.1944. Being sent forward, first to the Bayeux area attached to 352. Infanterie-Div (on 19.03.1944) and then to the Meuvaines area, and attached to 716 Infanterie-Div (on 29.05.1944). Arriving ‘late' in the Graye-sur-Mer area, Ost-Bataillon 441., was positioned at a ‘Regimental Boundary' in Infanterie-Division 716, its four companies divided to fight in two different ‘Battalion KVU-Gruppe Defence Sectors'.

- From MIKE Green, the Canadian Scottish Regiment moving south, bypassed the fight for WN31 Courseulles-sur-Mer (Westen), keeping well west of the Seulles, quickly passed through Kompanie 1./ Ost-Batl 441., at Hameau de Vaux (Le Buisson – Aérium de Graye). Located beyond the poorly drained wet lands behind the beach, it had abandoned its position receiving Beach Drenching Fire from HMS Venus (RN) and La Combattante (FNFL). La Combattante, commanded by Commandant André Patou, was a Hunt (Type III) Escort Destroyer, commissioned on 30.12.1942 (as FNFL), was lost to a sea bottom anchored LMB mine, in the Humber Estuary, on 23.02.1945.
- From NAN Green, shortly delayed by the second fight for WN29 Courseulles-sur-Mer (Osten), bypassing the fight for WN30 Courseulles-sur-Mer (Süden), the Regina Rifles Regiment encountered Kompanie 2. / Ost-Batl 441., positioned south of Courseulles-sur-Mer at Les Rotys (at N 49.313Deg / W 0.455Deg). Blocking their approach, it did not cause much delay, weakened by Beach Drenching Fire from HMS Stevenstone (RN) and HMS Venus (RN), and having 'lost elements' ordered to join Kompanie 8. / II 736., at Les Ruines St Ursin, at La Tomblette.

The second wave companies of The Regina Rifle Regiment (NAN Green), The Royal Winnipeg Rifles (MIKE Red) and The Canadian Scottish (MIKE Green), experiencing different fights, beyond their beaches, expected the 88mm (Flak 16 Aircraft Artillery Gun, with a maximum rate of fire of 15 shells/min) to remain a serious threat throughout the day. An organized line of four anti-tank weapon positions had been set out in their paths, which would not develop the delay planned. The Assault Group J1 - Beach Drenching Fire Programme did such damage that the Canadians quickly moved beyond its Beachhead Objective Line (YEW), with fewer casualties than anticipated.

- 14. (PaK) Kompanie / Grenadier-Regiment 726. at Hameau de Vaux (le Buisson) is not geo-located in sources (by a French Lambert Conic LZ1 vT MR Grid). Retained in the KVU-Gr.Meuvaines Sector, by the Kdr Grenadier-Regiment 726., (having given up three Battalions to Inf.Div. 352.), as found in sources, it was located forward of Bataillon Stab II./726, at Hameau de Vaux, south of WN33a. Sited in fortifications of log crib timber, earth field construction, Assault Group J1 Beach Drenching Fire neutralized the three 'small' anti-tank guns.
  - Zug - 14 (PaK) Ko./726 deployed x2 7.5 cm PaK at le Buisson, to the rear of the left flank of Ko 1./Ost Bn 441. If it had not been destroyed it would have fired on 'C' Company, Canadian Scottish.
  - Zug - 14 (PaK) Ko./726 deployed x1 7.5 cm PaK) at Aérium de Graye, to the rear of the right flank of Ko 1./Ost Bn 441. If it had not been destroyed it would have fired on 'C' Company, Canadian Scottish.
- Panzerjäger-Abteilung 716./ Kompanie 2. ordered established on 25 Dec 1943, consisted of two platoons each with x3 7.5 cm ATk guns, and one platoon with x2 8.8 cm ATk guns. Its three platoons deployed consistent with the Division Commanders direction that "… all available immobile weapons should be built in, should cover the beach and the sea, and should be able to observe these directly; they should therefore be placed in the most advanced line or very close behind it, as was for instance the Second Divisional Anti-Tank Company." (Generalleutnant Richter GOC 716 ID, Narrative: The Battle of 716 Inf Div in Normandy). As he noted, "It can be seen from Appendices "C" and "D" that this anti-tank company (2/716) was deployed in small parcels close to the coast in the Canadian assault sector. It is not geo-located in sources (with a French Lambert Conic LZ1 vT MR Grid). ‘Evidently, it was destroyed (by Beach Drenching Fire.)'
  - Züg - Kompanie 2. /Pz.Jg-Abt 716., sited just west of Graye-sur-Mer, in the Hameau de la Valette, it manning x3 7.5 cm Pak 40, in an open field emplacement. If it had not been destroyed it would have fired on 'D' Company, Canadian Scottish.
  - Züg - Kompanie 2. /Pz.Jg-Abt 716., sited east of Graye-sur-Mer, southeast of Courseulles-sur-Mer, in an open field emplacement, it manning x3 7.5 cm Pak 40 on Les Champs des Fers (at N49.320 Deg / W 0.434 Deg). If it had not been destroyed it would have fired on 'D' Company, The Regina Rifle Regiment.
  - Züg - Kompanie 2. /Pz.Jg-Abt 716., sited well east of Graye-sur-Mer, southwest of Bernières-sur-Mer: on Les Perruques, in an open field emplacement, it manning x2 8.8 cm Pak 43/41[50]. Perhaps not destroyed, it would have fired on Le Régiment de la Chaudière, exiting Bernières, as it did 19th Cdn (Army) Field Regiment (hitting x3 SP 105 mm guns ... destroying all three in less than a minute).

While surrounded by arriving Canadians, Graye-sur-Mer was not the object of a damaging tactical engagement on D-Day, its ‘liberation' almost uneventful, coming very early in the morning.

- 'D' Company, Royal Winnipeg Rifles, (OC Major L. Fulton), landing on MIKE Green at 07h49 BST, west of WN 31, quickly moved off the beach and cleared a path through a minefield at Hameau La Vallette. By 09h00 BST, heading for Graye-sur-Mer, the ‘Little Black Devils' cleared the town, and moved off, some sections making good progress to Banville.
- 'D' Company, Canadian Scottish Regiment (OC Major Ewan), from MIKE Red, struck inland at 08h30, taking the route of an open exit, and moved up between Hameau La Valette and Graye-sur-Mer. The Princess Mary's first objective was to seize the bridges over the Seulles, south of the town, at MR 928819 (D12 La Seulles: Pont Ouest) and MR 953817 (D12 La Seulles: Pont Est) (LZ1 vT MR Grid French Lambert Conic).
- Delayed by limited beach exits, the engineers able to clear a path and complete a causeway, at 09h20 'A' Squadron, 1st Hussars, began to move toward their first objective, Graye-sur-Mer.
- After some delay in getting off the beaches, Bde HQ 7 CIB arrived in Graye-sur-Mer at 12h15 BST, “... rather surprised that they were in battle with the result that it took time to shake down as a HQ.” The Brigade Commander's party had landed about 09h30 and moved to the Main Beach Signal Station, that would act as the headquarters communications centre, waiting for the Brigade Main Headquarters and its Signals Troop. Brigade Main Headquarters arrived, the Bde HQ moved off and “... spent the night at 927808 COLUMBIERS-SUR-SEULLES, ...”. Graye-sur-Mer was freed.

== Population ==
Historical population
Year	Pop.	±% p.a.
1968	416	—
1975	405	−0.38%
1982	525	+3.78%
1990	567	+0.97%
1999	593	+0.50%
2007	648	+1.11%
2012	637	−0.34%
2017	685	+1.46%
2023	773	+2.03%
Source: INSEE

== Monuments ==
The first Château de Vaux was built at the beginning of the 17th century. The entrance gate was defended by two towers with conical roofs and modillions under the cornice, only one of which remains; behind it was a vast park. Before the Revolution, it belonged to the Marquis de Saint-Suplix). It passed into the hands of one of his two daughters, Angélique Costé de Saint-Suplix (1757-1817), who in 1782 married Charles-Marie-Philippe Huchet de La Bédoyère (1751-1809), father of Charles de la Bédoyère, who was shot in 1815, at the same time as Marshal Michel Ney. The estate was purchased by the orientalist Count Amédée Jaubert, who sold it to Félix Person, a member of parliament, who demolished the old château to build a new one; the old dovecote was used in the construction of the new one to form a corner room. According to Théophile Marie, a Mrs Ratcliffe, an English Protestant, lived there at some point and had some work carried out (perhaps enlarging the gardens). On 6 October 1925, the estate was acquired by the department to establish a seaside preventorium, thanks to Baron François Gérard (grandson of the nephew of the painter François Gérard, deputy for Calvados 1919-1929, then turned into a children's home (where the writer Xavier Le Clerc briefly resided) and today in an établissement public social ou médico-social.

== See also ==
- Communes of the Calvados department
