= Portpool =

Manor in the district of Holborn, London

Coordinates: 51.5193°N 0.1127°W

Portpool was a manor or soke in the district of Holborn, London. It is not recorded in the Domesday Book but references to it occur from the 12th century onwards. For many years it was owned by the Dean and Chapter of St Paul's Cathedral, who let it out to the Grey family. The manor house of Portpool subsequently became known as Gray's Inn, acquiring a reputation for the teaching of law.

== Location ==
Documents from the 13th and 14th centuries indicate that Portpool included the present site of Gray's Inn, stretching eastwards beyond Leather Lane, northwards beyond present day Clerkenwell Road and southwards to the City boundary. Its area diminished over time as parts were sold off.

The exact location of the manor buildings does not appear to be recorded, although it is assumed by most historians that they lay in the area of the current hall of Gray's Inn.

The pool from which Portpool gets its name may have been located near the north-west corner of Brooke Street.

== History ==
Simon de Gardino de Purtepole left his house within Holeburne bar to his son-in-law Richard de Chygewelle or Chigwell. Chygewelle in 1294 enfeoffed the Dean and Chapter of St Paul's with the property, and they enfeoffed Reginald de Grey, who held it of them in 1307. Before 1397 Henry Grey de Wilton had made a feoffment of "Portpole maner called Grey's Inn" to certain persons in trust.

On 12 August 1506 Edmund Grey, 9th Baron Grey de Wilton (d. 1511) sold to Hugh Denys (d.1511), Groom of the Stool to King Henry VII "the manor of Portpoole (one of the prebends belonging to St. Paul's Cathedral), otherwise called Gray's Inn, four messuages, four gardens, the site of a windmill, eight acres of land, ten shillings of free rent, and the advowson of the chantry of Portpoole." The manor was bequeathed by Denys in his will to Sheen Priory, in Surrey, where he was buried, in trust for the augmentation of the Chapel of All Angels at Brentford End. After a delay of five years involving a legal dispute during which a royal licence was being sought by Denys's executors to alienate the manor to Sheen, the Priory leased "the mansion of Portpoole" to "certain students of the law", at the annual rent of £6 13s. 4d. After the dissolution of the monasteries the benchers of Gray's Inn were entered in the King's books as the fee farm tenants of the Crown, at the same rent as paid to the monks of Sheen.

John Stow, writing at the end of the 16th century, stated that beyond Holborn Bars lay "Porte Poole, or Grayes Inne lane, so called of the Inne of Courte, named Grayes Inne, a goodly house there scituate, by whome builded or first begun I haue not yet learned, but seemeth to be since Edward the thirds time, and is a prebend to Paules Church in London."

The name Portpool is preserved today in Portpool Lane, which runs to the east off Gray's Inn Road.

== Origins of the name ==
Some authors have speculated, without linguistic analysis, that the "Port" in Portpool refers to a gate or a market. However, the earliest references to the name of the manor indicate that the first syllable is "Purt" ("Purtepol" c.1200 and 1203; "Purtepole" 1220 and 1309; "Pourtepol" 1316). This shows that it cannot be "port" in any sense of that word but instead a personal name, "Purta". It is therefore "Purta's Pool". Certainly, it has not been convincingly shown that "port" refers to any particular gate or market, and indeed the idea of locating a gate or market near a pool is a little unusual.
