= John de Grey, 1st Baron Grey de Rotherfield =

English soldier and courtier (1300-1359)

John de Grey
- Baron Grey de Rotherfield
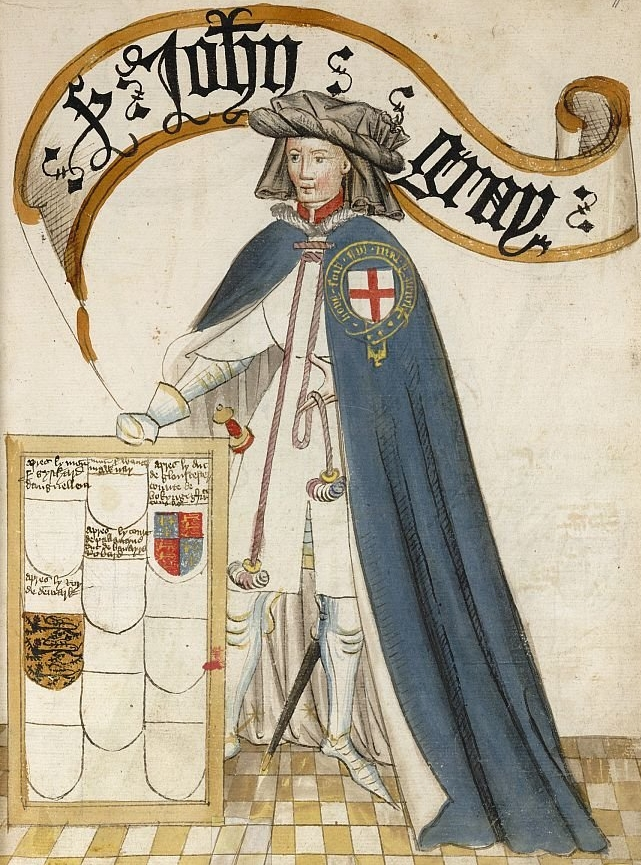
- John de Grey, 1st Baron Grey, KG, depicted in the Bruges Garter Book, 1430-40
- Born: 9 October 1300; Rotherfield, Oxfordshire, England
- Died: 1 September 1359 (aged 58); Rotherfield, Oxfordshire, England
- Spouses: Katherine FitzAlan; Avice Marmion
- Issue: Sir John de Grey, 3rd Baron Grey of Rotherfield; Sir John Marmion; Sir Robert de Grey; Maud de Grey
- Father: Sir John de Grey
- Mother: Margaret de Odingsells

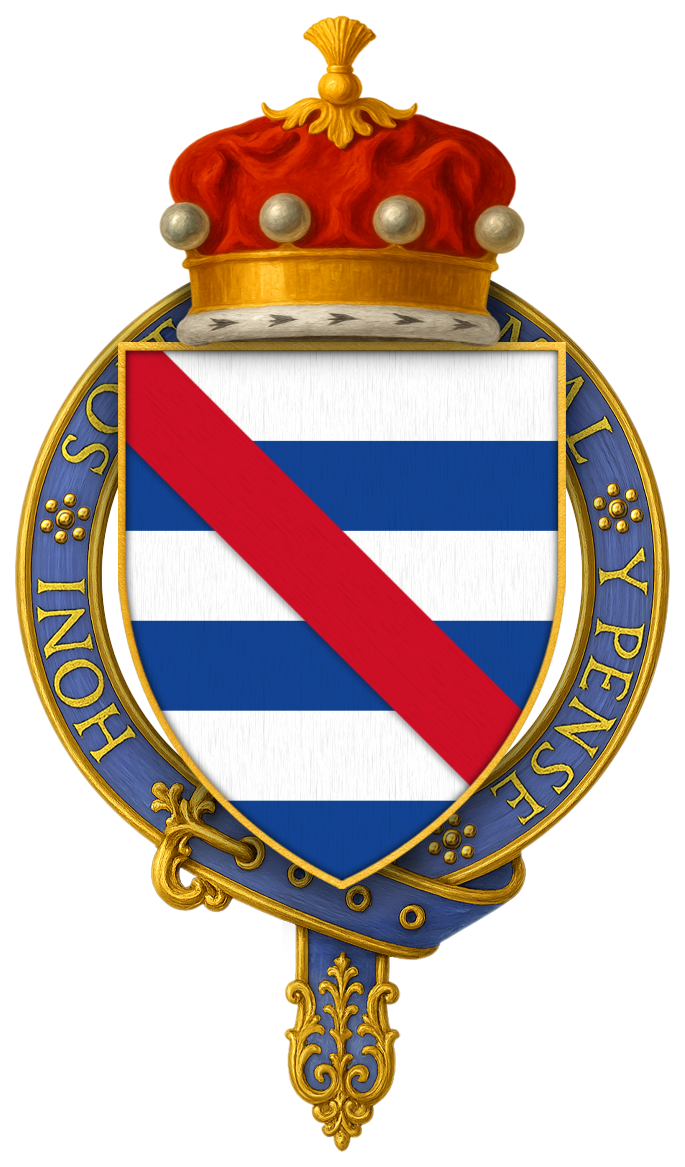
Arms of Sir John de Grey, KG

John de Grey, 1st Baron Grey de Rotherfield KG (9 October 1300 – September 1359) was an English soldier and courtier. John was the son and heir of Sir John de Grey of Rotherfield, by Margaret, daughter of William de Odingsells.

John de Grey of Rotherfield was a founding member of the Most Noble Order of the Garter.

By December 1349, John was Lord Steward of the Royal Household of King Edward III. He distinguished himself well in the Scottish and French wars. He was summoned to Parliament often from 1338 to 1357, and is regarded as having thus become Baron Grey of Rotherfield.

== Family ==
His first marriage, shortly before 1313, was to Katherine FitzAlan, daughter and co-heir of Bryan FitzAlan, Lord FitzAlan of Bedale, brother-in-law to King John of Scotland, Yorkshire. By that marriage, he had a single son and heir:

- Sir John de Grey, 2nd Baron Grey de Rotherfield. He married Maud de Burghersh, daughter of Sir Bartholomew Burghersh the elder, 1st Baron Burghersh.

His second marriage was to Avice, daughter of John Marmion, Baron of Winteringham. By that marriage, he had the following issue:

- John de Grey aka Marmion, (d.s.p. 1385) m. Elizabeth St. Quintin (b.1341). His full brother's daughter, Elizabeth, was his heiress.
- Sir Robert de Grey aka Marmion, m. Lora St. Quintin (b.1343); their daughter Elizabeth m. Henry FitzHugh, 3rd Baron FitzHugh.

Peerage of England
Preceded by new creation	Baron Grey of Rotherfield; 1338–1359	Succeeded by John de Grey
