= Sir John de Grey =

English soldier and high sheriff

High Sheriff of Herefordshire
- In office 1252–1253

High Sheriff of Bedfordshire and Buckinghamshire
- In office 1238–1239

Personal details
- Died: March 1266
- Spouse(s): Emma de Glanville; Emma de Cauz; Johanna de Lambley
- Children: 3, including Reginald
- Parent: Henry de Grey (father)
- Relatives: Richard de Grey (brother); John Grey (grandson)

Sir John de Grey (died 1266) was an English soldier and high sheriff.

== Biography ==
John was the second son of Henry de Grey of Grays Thurrock in Essex. He served as High Sheriff of Bedfordshire and Buckinghamshire in 1238–39 and of High Sheriff of Herefordshire in 1252–53, undertaking military service in Flanders in 1232. He lived at Shirland in Derbyshire, married three times and his son, by his second wife, was Reginald de Grey, 1st Baron Grey de Wilton. He was accordingly an ancestor of many of the noble houses with the surname Grey. He died in March 1266.

Political offices
Preceded by Robert de Haya	High Sheriff of Bedfordshire and Buckinghamshire; 1238–1239	Succeeded by Paulin de Peyvre
