= Henry de Grey =

English knight

Arms of Grey: Barry of six Argent and Azure

Henry de Grey of Grays Thurrock, Essex (1155–1219) was a favourite courtier of King John of England.

== Life ==
In 1195 he had been granted the Manor of Thurrock in Essex which later became known as Grays Thurrock (or simply Grays), which he bought from Isaac the Jew and his son Josce. To commemorate this connection, on 11 June 2013 (the 808th anniversary of the charter), a green Thurrock heritage plaque was unveiled to de Grey. Before 1201 he was also granted the Manor of Codnor, Derbyshire, and in 1216 was also granted by King Henry III of England the Manor of Grimston in Nottinghamshire.

== Marriage and issue ==
Around 1199 he married at Thurrock, Essex, Isolda Bardolf (Hoo, Kent, c. 1168 - bef. 18 June 1246), also known as Iseaude, sister and co-heiress of Robert Bardolf of Codnor in Derbyshire, and daughter of Hugh Bardolf of Codnor, Derbyshire (son of Hugo Bardol, born in 1125), and Isobel Aquillion, by whom he had these sons:

- Sir Richard de Grey of Codnor Derbyshire, ancestor of the Barons Grey of Codnor
- Sir John de Grey of Shirland Derbyshire, ancestor of the Barons Grey of Wilton and Barons Grey of Ruthyn, and through the Ruthyn Greys he was ancestor of John Grey of Groby, the first husband of Elizabeth Woodville, who later married Edward IV. In this connection, Sir John was the ancestor of the Viscounts Lisle, the Grey Marquesses of Dorset and of Lady Jane Grey. It is from Sir John's descendants the Greys of Wilton that Gray's Inn takes its name.
- William de Grey of Cavendish, Suffolk, of Landford, Nottinghamshire and of Sandiacre, Derbyshire, ancestor of the Greys of Merton, Norfolk and a remote ancestor of the Barons Walsingham
- Robert de Grey, ancestor of the Barons Grey of Rotherfield
- Henry de Grey
- Hugh de Grey (born Chillingham, Northumberland, c. 1203), father of John de Grey, born in Scotland, and grandfather of Thomas de Grey of Heton (Heton, Northumberland, circa 1266 - Angus, Scotland, 1310), whose son Thomas (circa 1297 - bef. 12 March 1343/1344) was father of Thomas de Grey The Chronicler who was taken prisoner by the Scots at Bannockburn and who was the ancestor of all three creations of the Earls of Tankerville, and the Earls Grey
- unknown de Grey, father of Eve de Grey who married Walter Beke of Eresby Lincolnshire and was ancestor of the Barons Willoughby de Eresby
- Walter de Grey, Archbishop of York 1216-1255

After his death his widow remarried Reynold de Meurdre.

== Sources ==
- L. G. Pine, The New Extinct Peerage 1884-1971: Containing Extinct, Abeyant, Dormant and Suspended Peerages With Genealogies and Arms (London, U.K.: Heraldry Today, 1972), p. 136.
- Charles Mosley, editor, Burke's Peerage, Baronetage & Knightage, 107th edition, 3 volumes (Wilmington, Delaware, U.S.A.: Burke's Peerage (Genealogical Books) Ltd, 2003), volume 2, p. 1665.
- G.E. Cokayne; with Vicary Gibbs, H.A. Doubleday, Geoffrey H. White, Duncan Warrand and Lord Howard de Walden, editors, The Complete Peerage of England, Scotland, Ireland, Great Britain and the United Kingdom, Extant, Extinct or Dormant, new ed., 13 volumes in 14 (1910-1959; reprint in 6 volumes, Gloucester, U.K.: Alan Sutton Publishing, 2000), volume II, p. 89.
- The Peerage of England: Containing a Genealogical and Historical Account of ...Vol. 2 By Arthur Collins
