= Grey baronets =

There have been three baronetcies created for members of the Grey family, one in the Baronetage of England, one in the Baronetage of Great Britain and one in the Baronetage of the United Kingdom. Two of the creations are extant as of 2026.

- Grey baronets of Chillingham in the County of Northumberland (1619): see Baron Grey of Werke
- Grey baronets of Howick in the County of Northumberland (1746): see Earl Grey
- Grey baronets of Fallodon (1814)

== See also ==
- Lambert baronets, who bore the surname Grey from 1905 to 1938
