= Richard Grey, 4th Baron Grey of Codnor =

English soldier and diplomat

The Right Honourable The Lord Grey of Codnor KG
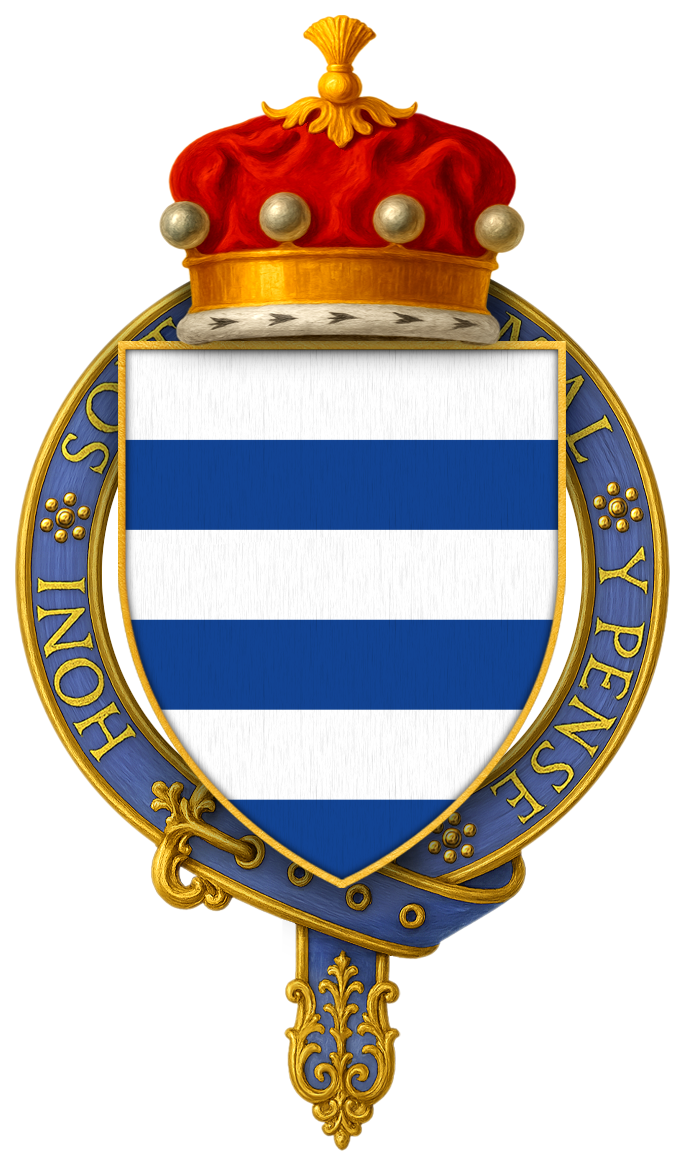

Chamberlain of the Household
- In office 1404–1413
- Monarch: Henry IV
- Preceded by: Sir Thomas Erpingham
- Succeeded by: The Lord FitzHugh

Personal details
- Born: c. 1371
- Died: 1 August 1418
- Resting place: Aylesford Priory, Kent, England
- Occupation: Soldier and diplomat

Richard Grey, 1st or 4th Baron Grey of Codnor (Note: Grey has been historically referred to as the fourth holder of the Grey of Codnor barony. The barony fell into abeyance following the death of the seventh baron in 1496; the termination of the abeyance in 1989 held that there was no evidence that the first three barons sat in Parliament and that the barony should be dated 1397.) (c. 1371 – 1 August 1418) was an English soldier and diplomat. He was made Chamberlain and governor of Roxburgh Castle, now Floors Castle.

== Military and diplomatic service ==
In 1400 he was appointed Admiral of the king's fleet from the Thames to the north, and in the same year was made Governor of Roxburgh Castle. In 1402 he was one of the commissioners appointed to treat with Owain Glyndŵr for the release of Reginald Grey, 3rd Baron Grey de Ruthyn. He was appointed justice of South Wales in 1403, a position he held until 1407, and from 1404 to 1413 served as Chamberlain of the Household. In 1405 Grey submitted certain considerations on the state of Wales to the king and council and on 2 December he was appointed Lieutenant of South Wales, and held the post until 1 February 1406. In 1405 Grey was also engaged in a controversy with Henry Beaumont, 5th Baron Beaumont as to which of them was entitled to precedency, the earliest record of such a dispute between two barons. In this year he also acted as Marshal during the absence of Ralph de Neville, 1st Earl of Westmorland, in 1406 was a commissioner to receive fines from the Welsh rebels, in 1407 became Constable of Nottingham Castle and Ranger of Sherwood Forest, and in 1413 Governor of Fronsac in Aquitaine.

From 1412 he was constantly employed on diplomatic missions. In 1413 he was one of the ambassadors to treat for a marriage between Henry, Prince of Wales, and Anne, daughter of John, Duke of Burgundy. Next year he was one of those appointed to procure a prolongation of the truce with France, and one of the ambassadors to negotiate a marriage between Henry V and Catherine of France. In August 1415 he was employed to negotiate a truce with Robert Stewart, Duke of Albany, regent of Scotland, and shortly after was made Warden of the Eastern Marches. In 1418 he was Governor of the Castle of Argentan in Normandy.

Grey was summoned to parliament on 17 September 1397, and was made a Knight of the Garter in about 1404.

He died on 1 August 1418, possibly in France, and was buried at Aylesford Priory in Kent.

== Family ==
Grey was the son of Henry de Grey (died 1379), and succeeded his grandfather John de Grey 3rd Baron Grey of Codnor (1305–1392) in the Grey of Codnor barony. In 1387 he married Elizabeth, daughter of Ralph Basset of Sapcote, who died after 1446 and they had two sons and three daughters: John (c. 1396–1430), who succeeded as fifth baron; Henry (c. 1405–1443), who succeeded his brother as sixth baron; Elizabeth, who married John la Zouche; Eleanor, who married Thomas Newport; and Lucy, who married Rowland Lenthall. The barony fell into abeyance between the three sisters following the death of the seventh baron; the termination of the abeyance in 1989 was granted in the favour of a descendant of Lucy.

== Notes ==
Political offices
Preceded by Sir Thomas Erpingham	Chamberlain of the Household; 1404–1413	Succeeded by The Lord FitzHugh
Peerage of England
New creation	Baron Grey of Codnor; 1397–1418	Succeeded by John Grey
