= Roger Grey, 1st Baron Grey of Ruthin =

English noble

- Arms of Grey de Ruthyn: Barry of six argent and azure in chief three torteaux

Personal details
- Born: c. 1298
- Died: 6 March 1353 (aged 54–55)
- Spouse: Elizabeth Hastings
- Children: 2+, including Reginald
- Parent: John Grey (father)
- Relatives: Reginald de Grey (grandfather)

Roger Grey, 1st Baron Grey of Ruthin (c. 1298 – 6 March 1353) was summoned to parliament in 1324. He saw much service as a soldier.

Roger was the son of John Grey, 2nd Baron Grey de Wilton, and Maud Bassett. He married Elizabeth, daughter of John Hastings, 1st Baron Hastings of Bergavenny, by whom he had a son who succeeded as Reynold, 2nd Baron Grey de Ruthyn.

Militarily, Roger Grey first attended the Scottish expedition of 1318, then in 1327 in the company of Edmund, earl of Kent, and, finally, in 1341. With respect to France, Grey provided twenty men-at-arms and twenty archers for the French expedition in 1343 and accompanied Edward III in 1345, when Edward asserted his claim to the French throne. In addition, in 1352, he served as commissioner of array in Bedfordshire and Buckinghamshire, where he held extensive property.

His daughter, Mary, married Sir William d'Isney, High Sheriff of Lincolnshire (1340), Knight of the Shire in Parliament (1343).

== Bibliography ==
- Douglas Richardson, Magna Carta Ancestry, 2nd Edition, Vol. I, p. 573.
- Douglas Richardson, Magna Carta Ancestry, 2nd Edition, Vol. II, pp. 181–182, 271–272.
- Douglas Richardson, Magna Carta Ancestry, 2nd Edition, Vol. III, pp. 329, 432.
- Douglas Richardson, Magna Carta Ancestry, 2nd Edition, Vol. IV, pp. 341–342.
- Douglas Richardson, Plantagenet Ancestry, pp. 607, 620, 764–765.
- Douglas Richardson, Plantagenet Ancestry: 2nd Edition, Vol. III, p. 100.
- Douglas Richardson, Royal Ancestry, Vol. II, p. 258.
- Douglas Richardson, Royal Ancestry, Vol. III, pp. 123–124, 257, 442–443.
- Douglas Richardson, Royal Ancestry, Vol. IV, pp. 313, 470.
- Douglas Richardson, Royal Ancestry, Vol. V, pp. 367–368.
- George Edward Cokayne, The Complete Peerage, Vol. VI, pp. 151–153.
- Burke's Peerage, p. 1162.
- Ronny O. Bodine, The Ancestry of Dorothea Poyntz, p. 119.

Peerage of England
Preceded by New Creation	Baron Grey of Ruthin; 1324–1353	Succeeded by Reginald Grey
