= John Grey, 2nd Baron Grey de Wilton =

English noble and administrator

- Arms of the 2nd Baron Grey de Wilton

Member of Parliament
- In office 1309-1322

Personal details
- Died: 28 October 1323
- Spouse(s): Anne Ferrers; Maud Basset
- Children: 2, including Roger
- Parent: Reginald de Grey (father)
- Relatives: Sir John de Grey (grandfather)

John Grey, 2nd Baron Grey of Wilton (died 28 October 1323) was an English nobleman and administrator.

== Biography ==
Grey was the son of Reginald de Grey, 1st Baron Grey de Wilton and his wife Matilda. His first office was as vice-justice of Chester from 1296 to 1297.

Grey participated in the siege and capture of Caerlaverock Castle in July 1300, and his arms were recorded in the Roll of Caerlaverock, a roll of arms compiled during the diese.

Grey was summoned to Parliament from 1309 to 1322. His first parliamentary appointment was that of Lord Ordainer in 1310, and was followed by the grant in 1311 of Ruthin Castle, which passed to his younger son Roger de Grey. He was at the Battle of Bannockburn, on 24 June 1314. Nonetheless, he was appointed by Edward II as Justiciar of North Wales in February 1314/15.

Grey was relieved of his constabulatory responsibilities the following year and called to raise troops in response to the insurrection led by Llywelyn Bren. He served as conservator of the peace for Bedfordshire in 1320. In 1322, he was commanded to raise troops in Wales and join the royal muster at Coventry.

== Family ==
Grey married Anne, daughter of William Ferrers of Groby, Leicestershire. They had Henry de Grey, 3rd Baron Grey of Wilton (d. 1342).

Secondly, Grey married Maud, daughter of Ralph Basset. They had: Roger Grey, 1st Baron Grey of Ruthin (d. 1353).

Grey died on 28 October 1323.

Peerage of England
Preceded by Reginald de Grey	Baron Grey de Wilton; 1308–1323	Succeeded by Henry Grey
