= Richard de Grey =

Arms of Baron Grey of Codnor: Barry of six, argent and azure

Richard de Grey (died c. 1271) of Codnor, Derbyshire, was a landowner who held many important positions during the reign of Henry III of England, including Warden of the Isles (Channel Islands) 1226–1227, 1229–1230 and 1252–1254, and later both Constable of Dover Castle and Warden of the Cinque Ports from 1258 irregularly to 1264.

== Family ==
Richard was born not later than 1198. He was the eldest surviving son of Henry de Grey of Thurrock, an Essex landowner owning the manors of Codnor in Derbyshire and Grimston in Nottinghamshire; and Isolda de Bardolf.

In the 6th year of the reign of King Richard I, his father, Henry de Grey was granted the manor of Thurrock in Essex, which was confirmed by King John. By 1201 he held the Manor of Codnor in Derbyshire, and in 1216 had been further granted the Manor of Grimston. Henry de Grey married, in about 1185, Isolda, a daughter of Robert Bardolf, Richard's mother.

Richard de Grey married Lucy, the daughter and heir of John de Humez.

His eldest son, John, was born about 1225, and died on 5 January 1272, shortly after his father. John married Lucy, the daughter of Sir Reynold de Mohun of Dunster.

John's eldest son was Henry de Grey (c.1255 – 1 September 1308), of Codnor, Derbyshire; Grays Thurrock, Essex; and Aylesford and Hoo, Kent.

Henry campaigned in Gascony in 1294–1297, and was with Edward I at the siege of Caerlaverock in 1300. Henry campaigned in Scotland as late as 1306.

Henry was called to Parliament and was therefore later deemed to have been the 1st Baron Grey of Codnor, but this claim was disallowed on review in 1989. Henry married Eleanor de Redvers, daughter of Hugh de Courtenay, the 1st Earl of Devon. Their daughter Lucia married a son of Roger de Somerie and their daughter Agnes married Sir William Fitzwilliam of Emley and Sprotborough, one of the barons executed after the Battle of Boroughbridge.

== Notes ==
| Preceded by Nicholas de Moels | Lord Warden of the Cinque Ports; 1258 | Succeeded by Hugh de Bigod |
