= Richard Grey, 2nd Baron Grey of Codnor =

English soldier and diplomat

Arms of Baron Grey of Codnor: Barry of six, argent and azure.

Richard Grey, 2nd Baron Grey of Codnor (died 1335), of Codnor Castle, was an English soldier and diplomat.

== Life ==
Grey was the eldest son of Henry Gray, 1st Baron Grey of Codnor (died 1308) and Eleanor de Courteney. Richard succeeded to his father's titles in 1308, upon Henry's death. Richard was one of the barons who at the assembly of Stamford on 6 August 1309, signed a letter of remonstrance to the pope on the abuses in the church. He was employed in the Scottish wars in 1311, fought during the English defeat of the Battle of Bannockburn in 1314, and again in 1319–20 during the unsuccessful siege of Berwick and other confrontations against the Scots in the Scottish Marches. During the baronial revolt against King Edward II of England, known as the Despenser War, he assisted Roger Mortimer and the Marcher Lords, who attacked and plundered the Welsh possessions of royal favourite Hugh le Despenser, the younger. For these attacks, Richard was pardoned by Parliament in August 1321. Together with John Giffard and Robert de Shirland, they testified to the claim of Bartholomew Badlesmere that Despenser, the younger was a traitor. Misled by false letters, the rebels attempted to place Gray, Giffard and Shirland firmly on their side, but from the end of 1321 Gray was firmly on the side of Edward II, who took action against the baronial opposition. Richard served with the royal army, which pursued the rebels under the command of Thomas of Lancaster to the north of England. Grey remained in the favour of the king, who visited him after the victory over Lancaster in March 1322 at Grey's castle at Codnor, Derbyshire.

In 1324 Gray was appointed to the office of Seneschal of Gascony and Steward of the Duchy of Aquitaine. Gray resigned this office, in October 1324, serving Edmund of Woodstock, Earl of Kent during the war in Gascony. He was then sent to defend Argentan, in the Duchy of Normandy. In 1326, Richard was Constable of Nottingham Castle and in 1327 he was employed in the Scotch marches, and was summoned for the Scottish war in 1334, but was excused on the ground of sickness. He died in 1335.

== Marriage and issue ==
Richard married Joan, daughter of Robert FitzPayne, Lord FitzPayne and Isbella de Clifford.

- Jane Grey, married firstly William de Harcourt and secondly Ralph de Ferrers, son of Henry Ferrers, 2nd Baron Ferrers of Groby.
- John Grey (died 1392), married firstly Alianora and secondly Alice de L’isle, had issue.
- Robert Grey (died 1393), married Elizabeth Bryan, had issue.

His son Robert, took his mother's maiden name and became known as Robert FitzPayne.
