= Grey (surname) =

Grey or de Grey is a surname. Notable people with the surname include:

- Al Grey (1925–2000), American jazz trombonist with Count Basie
- Alan Grey, a former New Zealand rower
- Albert Grey, 4th Earl Grey (1851–1917), British politician, Governor General of Canada, eponym of the Grey Cup
- Alex Grey (born 1953), American artist
- Underscores (born 2000, April Harper Grey), American singer-songwriter and producer
- Anchitell Grey (1624–1702), Parliamentary diarist and MP for Derby
- Anne Grey, Baroness Hussey (c.1490–1545), English noblewoman
- Arthur Grey, 14th Baron Grey de Wilton (1536–1593), British soldier, Lord Deputy of Ireland
- Aubrey de Grey (born 1963), English writer on gerontology
- Beryl Grey (1927–2022), English ballerina
- Brad Grey (1957–2017), American television and film producer
- CGP Grey, YouTuber
- Charles Grey (disambiguation), multiple people
- Daniel Grey (1848–1900), Welsh international footballer
- David Grey, American poker player
- Deborah Grey (born 1952), Canadian politician
- Earl Grey, a title in the British peerage
  - Earl Grey tea (see also Charles Grey, 2nd Earl Grey)
  - Grey Cup (see also Albert Grey, 4th Earl Grey)
- Edward Grey, 1st Viscount Grey of Fallodon (1862–1933), British statesman, later Ambassador to USA
- Edmund Grey, 1st Earl of Kent (1416–1490), administrator and magnate
- Elizabeth Grey, 5th Baroness Lisle (1505–1519), English nobleman
- Ford Grey, 1st Earl of Tankerville (1655–1701)
- George Grey, 7th Earl of Stamford (1827–1883), President of MCC & landowner
- Sir George Grey (1812–1898), soldier, explorer, writer, Governor of: South Australia, New Zealand, Cape Colony (South Africa), New Zealand (2nd time)
- Sir George Grey, 2nd Baronet (1799–1882), British politician
- Henry de Grey (died 1219), English magnate
- Henry Grey, Duke of Suffolk (1517–1554), English magnate
- Henry Grey, 1st Baron Grey of Groby (1547–1614), British courtier and administrator, grandfather of Henry Grey, 1st Earl of Stamford
- Henry Grey, 10th Earl of Kent (1594–1651), British parliamentarian
- Henry Grey, 1st Earl of Stamford (1599–1673), British army officer, parliamentarian
- Henry Grey, 1st Duke of Kent (1671–1740), British courtier and politician
- Henry Grey, 3rd Earl Grey (1802–1894), British politician

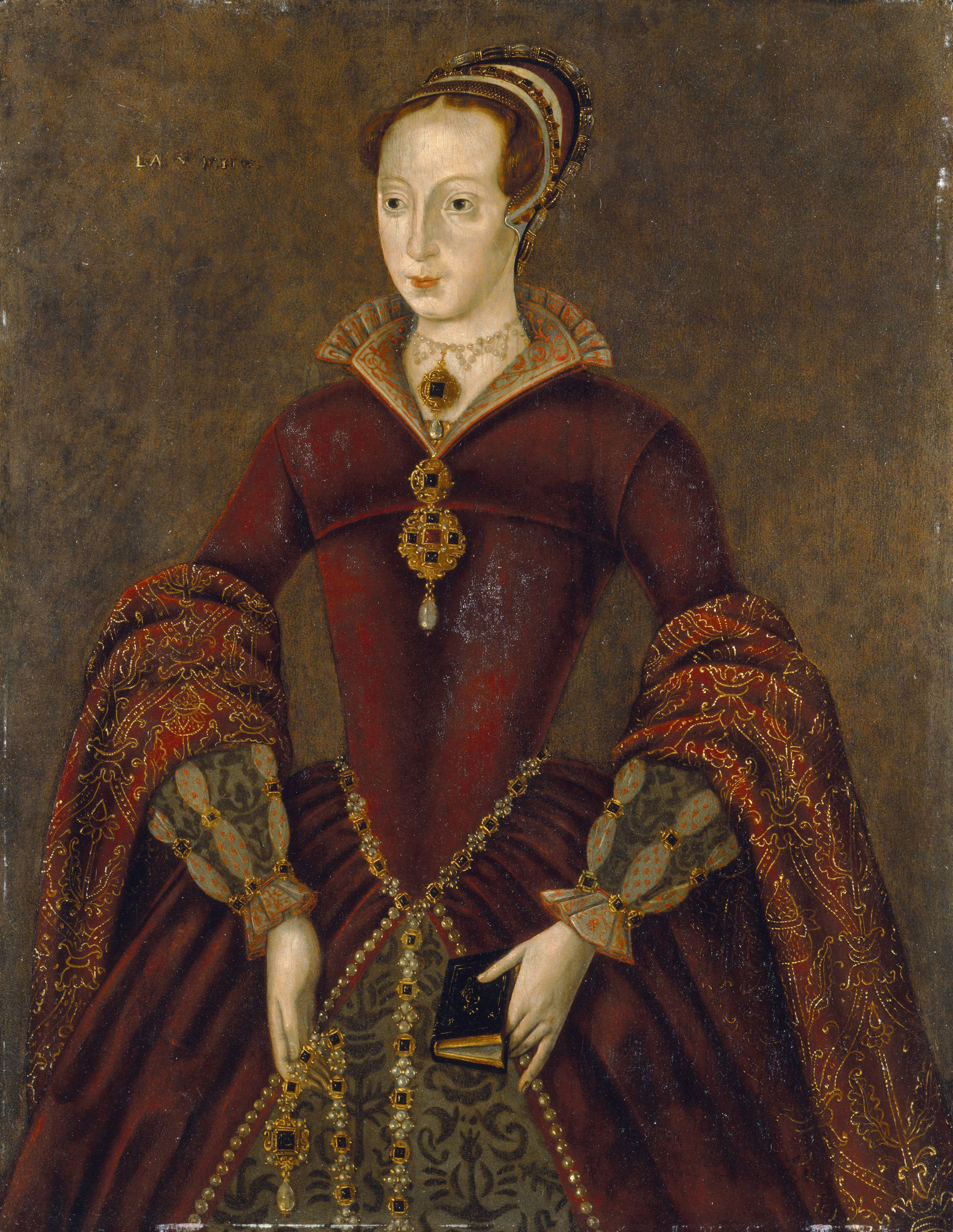
Jane Grey, 9 days Queen of England

- Lady Jane Grey (1537–1554), married name Dudley, Nine Days Queen of England
- Janet Grey (born 1952), American actress
- J. D. Grey (1906–1985), American clergyman
- Jean Grey, fictional character
- Jemima Yorke, 2nd Marchioness Grey (1723–1797), letter writer
- Jennifer Grey (born 1960), American actress
- Joel Grey (born 1932), American actor, singer and dancer
- John Grey (knight) (1387–1459), English soldier of the Hundred Years' War, Lord Deputy of Ireland
- Sir John Grey (1782–1856), officer of British Army and the East India Company forces
- Johnny Grey (born 1951), British kitchen designer and architect
- Jonathan Grey (born 1992), Filipino basketball player
- Julius Grey (born 1948), Canadian lawyer, professor and minority rights advocate
- Kaiti Grey (1924–2025), Greek singer and actress
- Lady Katherine Grey (1540–1568), Countess of Hertford, younger sister of Lady Jane Grey, Queen of England
- Katherine Grey (actress) (1873–1950), American actress
- Keisha Grey (born 1994), American pornographic actress
- Lady Grey (disambiguation), multiple people
- Lita Grey (1908–1995), American actress and wife of Charles Chaplin
- Leonard Grey, 1st Viscount Grane (1492–1551), Lord Deputy of Ireland
- Maria Georgina Grey (1816–1906), educationist and writer who promoted women's education
- Martha Grey, Countess of Stamford (1838-1916), South African member of English nobility
- Mary Grey (disambiguation), multiple people
- F. Millward Grey (1899–1957), art teacher and designer in South Australia
- Nigel de Grey (1886–1951), British codebreaker
- Paris Grey (born 1965), American singer
- Sir Raleigh Grey (1860–1936), pioneer British colonizer of Southern Rhodesia
- Ralph Grey, Baron Grey of Naunton (1910–1999), Governor of Northern Ireland
- Ray Grey (1890–1925), American film director and actor
- Reynold Grey, 3rd Baron Grey of Ruthin (1362–1440), marcher lord, governor of Ireland
- Richard de Grey (died 1271), governor of the Channel Islands and Warden of the Cinque Ports
- Richard Grey (1458–1483), English soldier, constable of Wallingford Castle
- Richard Grey (priest) (1694–1771), English churchman and author
- Richard Grey, 6th Earl Grey (1939–2013), British nobleman
- Roger Grey, 1st Baron Grey of Ruthin (1298–1353), soldier
- Roger Grey, 10th Earl of Stamford (1896–1976), landowner
- Rudolph Grey, musician and writer
- Sab Grey (born 1962), American musician
- Sarah Grey (born 1996), Canadian actress
- Sasha Grey (born 1988), American sex idol
- Skylar Grey, American singer-songwriter
- Tanni Grey-Thompson (born 1969), Welsh athlete and TV presenter
- Thomas Grey (conspirator) (1384–1415), of Heaton, conspirator
- Thomas Grey, 1st Marquess of Dorset (1457–1501), courtier
- Thomas Grey, Lord Grey of Groby (c. 1623 – 1657), Member of Parliament during the English Long Parliament
- Thomas Grey, 2nd Earl of Stamford (c. 1654 – 1720), son of Thomas, Lord Grey of Groby
- Thomas de Grey, 2nd Earl de Grey (1781–1859), born Robinson, British Tory politician and statesman of the 19th century
- Thomas de Grey, 6th Baron Walsingham, British politician and entomologist
- Virginia Grey (1917–2004), American actress
- Zane Grey (1872–1939), American novelist

== Fictional characters ==
- Grey, a character in the game Mega Man ZX Advent
- Agnes Grey, novel by Anne Brontë
- Allan Grey, a character from A Streetcar Named Desire
- Christian Grey, Elliot Grey, Mia Grey and Carrick Grey, in the book Fifty Shades of Grey by E. L. James
- Jean Grey, a Marvel Comics character
- Meredith Grey, Grey's Anatomy
  - Lexie Grey, Meredith's half-sister
- Nate Grey, a Marvel Comics superhero
- Vivian Grey, Benjamin Disraeli's 1827 novel

== See also ==
- Grey (disambiguation)
- Baron Grey (disambiguation)
- Gray (surname)
