= Earl Grey (disambiguation) =

Earl Grey is a title in the Peerage of the United Kingdom, held consecutively by seven men since 1806.

Earl Grey may also refer to:

== Ships ==
- CCGS Earl Grey, Canadian Coast Guard icebreaker commissioned in 1986
- CGS Earl Grey, Canadian Coast Guard icebreaker commissioned in 1909
- Earl Grey (1835 ship), transported convicts from Great Britain to Australia

== Other ==
- Earl Grey (character), from the television series Scream Queens
- Earl Grey, Saskatchewan, a village in Canada
- "Earl Grey" (song), by English rock band Basement from the 2011 album I Wish I Could Stay Here
- Earl Grey tea, a blend of tea

== See also ==
- Earl de Grey, an extinct title in the Peerage of the United Kingdom
- Earl de Grey, Kingston upon Hull, an English pub
- Earl of Kent (1465), surnamed Grey
- Earl of Stamford, surnamed Grey
- Lord Grey (disambiguation)
- Lady Grey (disambiguation)
