= George Grey, 7th Earl of Stamford =

English cricketer, landowner and peer

The Right Honourable The Earl of Stamford and Warrington

Member of the House of Lords
- In office 1845–1883

Personal details
- Born: 7 January 1827 Enville, Staffordshire, England
- Died: 2 January 1883 (aged 55) Groby, Leicestershire, England
- Party: Whig
- Spouse(s): Elizabeth Billage (m. 1848) Catherine Cocks (m. 1855)
- Parent: George Booth-Grey, 8th Baron Grey of Groby (father)
- Relatives: George Booth-Grey, 6th Earl of Stamford and Warrington (grandfather); Francis Douglas, 8th Earl of Wemyss and March (grandfather)
- Education: Trinity College, Cambridge
- Military career
- Rank: Captain
- Commands: Cheshire Yeomanry; 7th Bn, Lancashire Rifles (Volunteers)
- Cricket career

Cricket information

Domestic team information
- Years: Team
- 1851–1858: Marylebone Cricket Club (MCC)
- FC debut: 26 May 1851 MCC v Middlesex
- Last FC: 14 June 1858 MCC v Sussex

George Harry Booth-Grey, 7th Earl of Stamford and 3rd Earl of Warrington (7 January 1827 – 2 January 1883), was an English cricketer, landowner and peer, who sat on the Whig benches in the House of Lords.

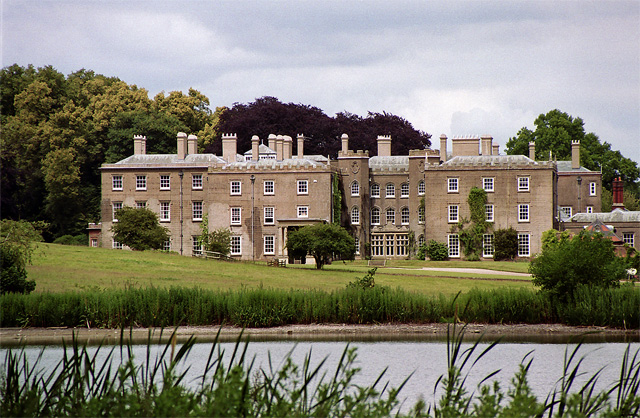
Enville Hall, Staffordshire

== Background ==
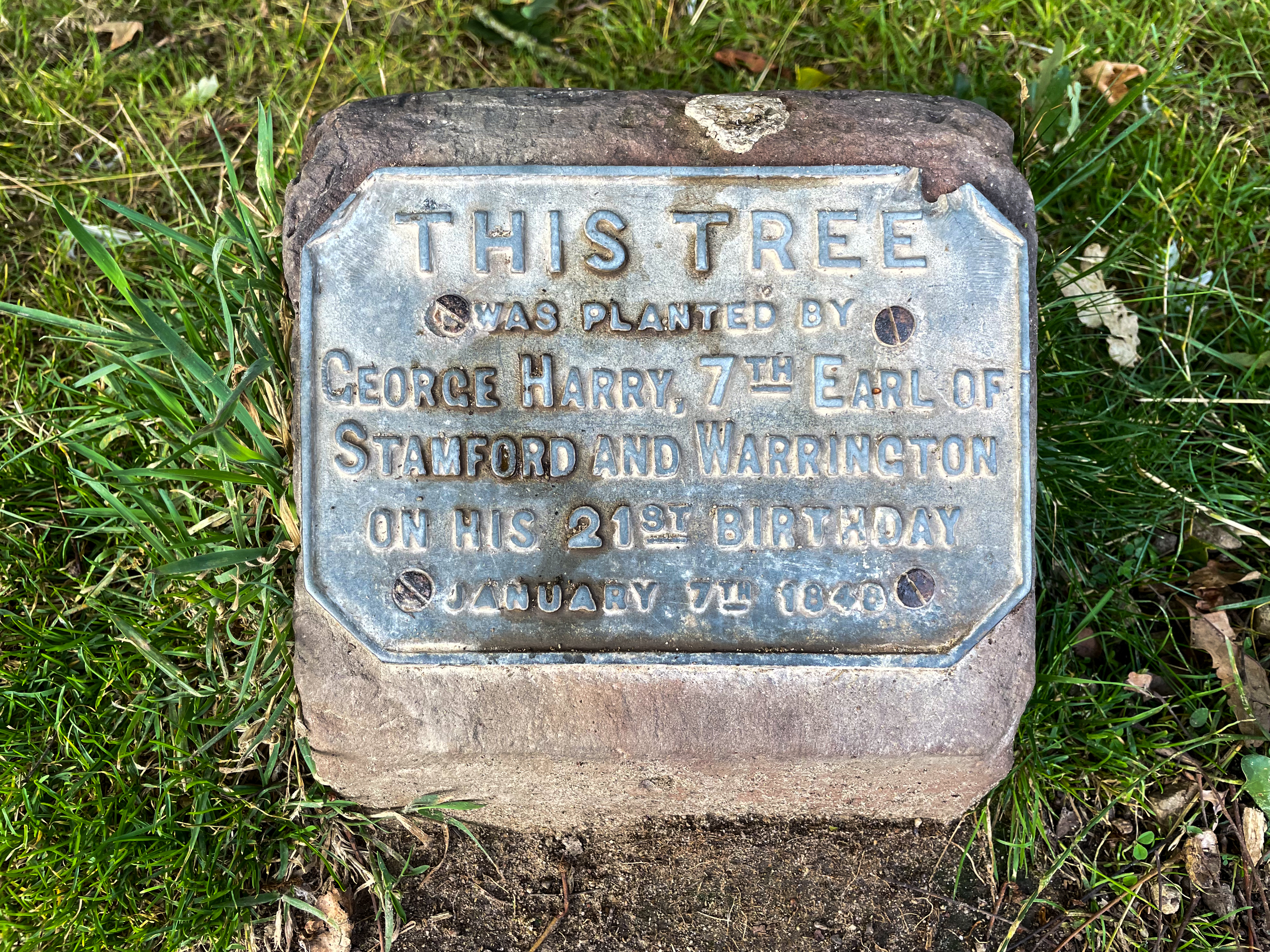
Plaque at the tree Lord Stamford and Warrington planted in Dunham Massey Park on his 21st birthday

George Harry Booth-Grey was born at Enville, Staffordshire, the only son of Lord Grey (1802–1835), who as Baron Grey of Groby had been summoned to Parliament by writ of acceleration in 1832. He succeeded his father as 9th Baron Grey of Groby (created 1603) on 24 October 1835.

Styled Lord Grey, he was educated at Eton (1840–1843) before going up to Trinity College, Cambridge, where he studied for one year. On the death of his grandfather the 6th Earl on 26 April 1845, he succeeded to the family titles of Earl of Stamford, Earl of Warrington and Baron Delamer.

== Life ==
President of Marylebone Cricket Club in 1851, Lord Stamford and Warrington played for Marylebone Cricket Club (MCC) in eight matches between 1851 and 1858, making 81 runs at an average of 7.36, with a highest score of 17, and taking two catches.

A prominent patron of the Turf, he was Master of the Quorn Hunt between 1856 and 1863, and whilst he did not have much notable success with his racehorses, his colt Diophantus won the Two Thousand Guineas in 1861.

Commissioned into the Cheshire Yeomanry, Lord Stamford and Warrington served as a Captain (1845–56), later being appointed Honorary Colonel of the 7th Battalion, Lancashire Rifles (Volunteers) in 1871.

== Marriage and legacy ==
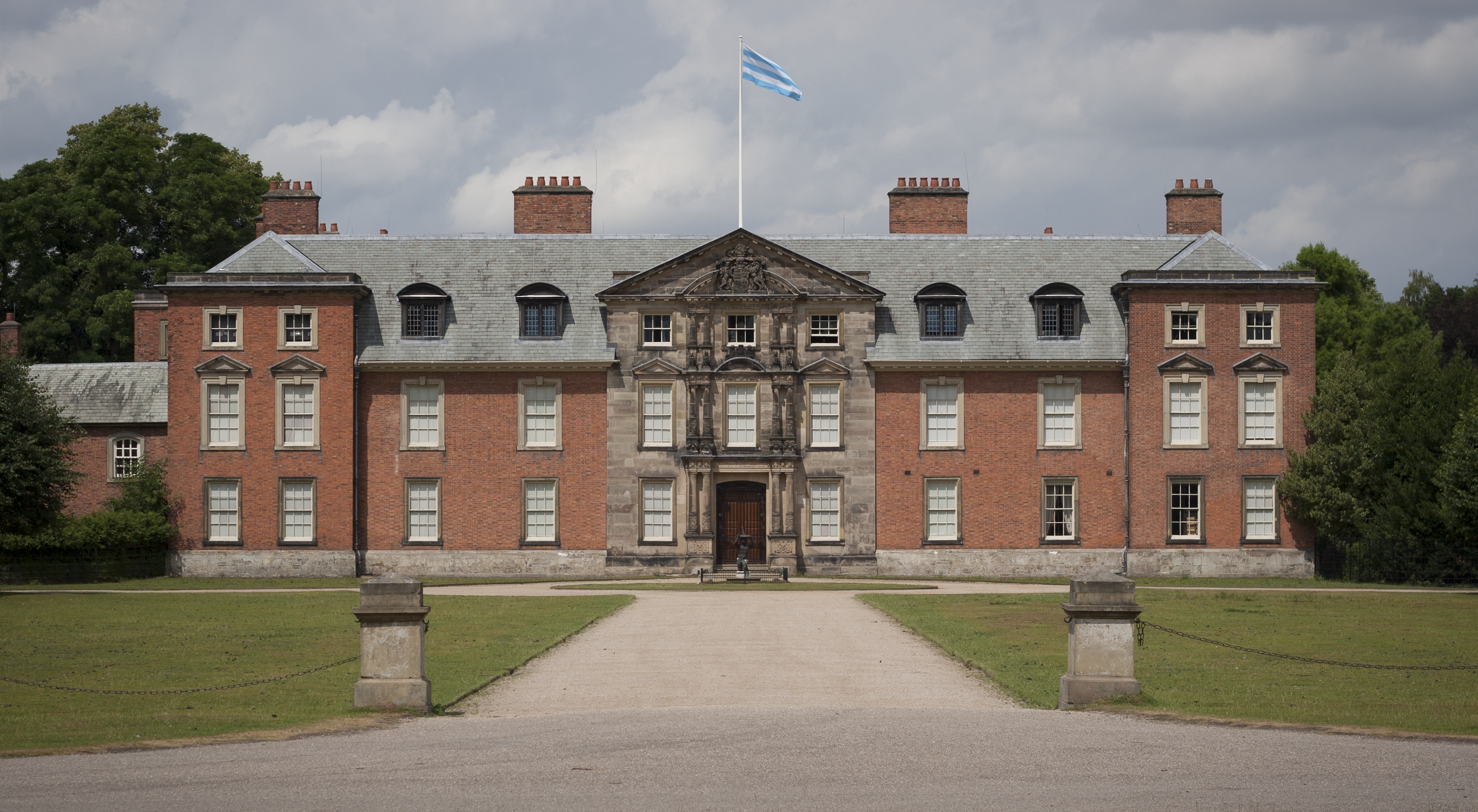
Dunham Massey Hall, Cheshire

Lord Stamford and Warrington married twice, but had no legitimate offspring; firstly in 1848 to Elizabeth King Billage (1823–1854), daughter of John Billage, a Cambridge shoemaker, and secondly in 1855 to Catherine Cocks (1826–1905), daughter of Henry Cocks, kinsman of the Earl Somers.

After inheriting his family's substantial estates at Enville in Staffordshire, Bradgate Park and elsewhere in Leicestershire (including the village of Groby), Dunham Massey in Cheshire, and Stalybridge in Lancashire, Lord Stamford and Warrington commissioned the building of St Margaret's Church in Dunham Massey in 1851. Built in honour of his only sister, Lady Margaret Milbank, the church was completed in 1855 being consecrated by the bishop of Chester. Patron of several advowsons, the Earl also owned numerous ancient lordships of manors.

Following his second marriage to Catherine Cocks, the Earl commissioned the architect M. J. Dain of Dain & Parsons, London, to design a new hall to replace the lodge previously used during the hunting season, which was named Bradgate House. Built by the local contractor Thomas Rudkin, Bradgate House was completed in 1856 in the Jacobean style. It became known as the Calendar House because it reportedly contained 365 windows, 52 rooms, and 12 main chimneys. A substantial stable block was also constructed around this time, following his appointment as Master of the Quorn in 1856, and was thought to have cost £30,000.

In 1860 twelve farms on his Bradgate estate were submerged to create Cropston Reservoir. In 1879 he donated 16 acres (6.5 ha) of land at Stalybridge to the borough council for use as a public park (now Stamford Park) and sold additional land for housing development.

His second wife, Catherine Cocks, was not approved by the Grey family as well as many in aristocratic social circles because of her background. She had worked as a horse rider in Astley's Circus in London. The Earl and Countess of Stamford and Warrington relocated from one of the family seats, Dunham Massey Hall, as a consequence. A silver sculpture of fighting stags that he commissioned to represent their relationship despite its obstacles was rediscovered in 2025.

Upon Lord Stamford and Warrington's death at Bradgate House in 1883, the earldom of Warrington (cr. 1796) became extinct. His other two peerage titles passed to his third cousin once removed, the Revd Harry Grey, 8th Earl of Stamford, who was then living in Cape Colony.

He left his estates "for life" to his widow, styled the Dowager Countess of Stamford and Warrington, upon whose death in 1905 they were divided. The Dunham Massey estate went with the earldom; the Leicestershire estates passed to his niece Mrs Arthur Duncombe (who assumed by Royal Licence the name and arms of Grey in 1905), and the Enville estate was inherited by the Dowager Countess's grandniece Catherine, wife of Sir Henry Foley Lambert. The land at Stalybridge was left equally between Mrs Duncombe and the Earl of Stamford and Warrington's niece and Lady Lambert the grand niece of Catherine, Countess of Stamford and Warrington, whose descendants (Deramore and Foley Grey respectively) settled its division in 1959. Mrs Duncombe sold the Leicestershire estates in 1925, which included Groby village and also Bradgate Hall. Bradgate House was demolished in 1926. Only the stable block survives, albeit in a ruinous and dilapidated condition.

=== Arms ===
Coat of arms of the Earl of Stamford and Warrington
Notes George Booth-Grey, 5th Earl of Stamford (cr. Earl of Warrington, 1796) Adopted 1772 Coronet That of an Earl Crest A Unicorn passant Ermine armed maned tufted and unguled Or in front of a Sun in splendour Escutcheon Quarterly; 1st and 4th, Barry of six Argent and Azure (for Grey); 2nd and 3rd, Three Boars' Heads erect and erased Sable langued Gules (for Booth) Supporters Two Unicorns Ermine armed maned tufted and unguled Or Motto À ma puissance (in French) (To my power) Symbolism Grey quartering Booth, representing the 4th Earl of Stamford's marriage with Lady Mary Booth (1704–1772) Other versions: Stamford and Warrington / Booth / Grey

== See also ==
- Booth baronets
- Baron Grey of Codnor

Peerage of England
Preceded by George Harry Booth-Grey	Earl of Stamford; 1845–1883	Succeeded by Harry Grey
Preceded by George Harry Booth-Grey	Baron Grey of Groby; 1835–1883	Succeeded by Harry Grey
Peerage of Great Britain
Preceded by George Harry Booth-Grey	Earl of Warrington; 1845–1883	Extinct
