= Harry Grey (disambiguation) =

Harry Grey was an American writer.

Harry Grey may also refer to:

- Harry Grey, 3rd Earl of Stamford (1685–1739), English peer
- Harry Grey, 4th Earl of Stamford (1715–1768), English peer
- Harry Grey, 8th Earl of Stamford (1812–1890), English peer
- Harry George Grey, English missionary and theologian

== See also ==
- Harry Gray (disambiguation)
- Henry Grey (disambiguation)
- Harold Grey (born 1971), boxer
