= George Grey, 6th Earl of Stamford =

British peer and parliamentarian (1765–1845)

The Right Honourable The Earl of Stamford and of Warrington
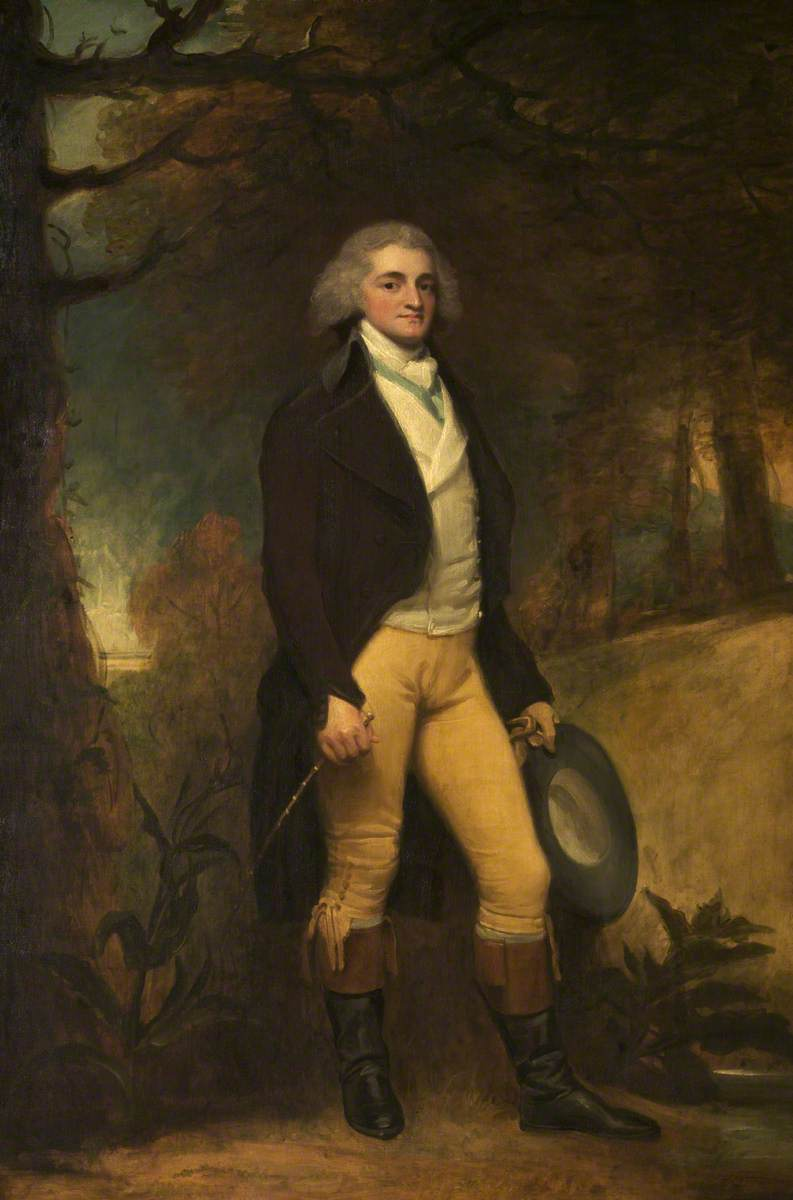
- painting by George Romney, 1790-1793

Member of the British Parliament for Aldeburgh
- In office 1790–1796

Member of the British Parliament for St Germans
- In office 1796–1802

Personal details
- Spouse: Henrietta Charteris
- Children: 5, including George Harry
- Parents: George Grey, 5th Earl of Stamford (father); Henrietta Cavendish Bentinck (mother)

Grey arms

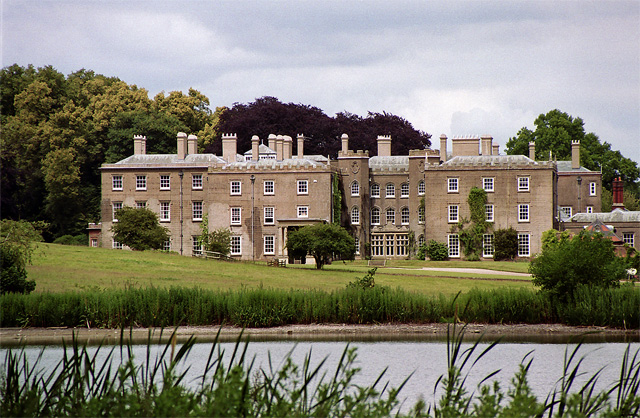
Enville Hall, Staffordshire

George Harry Booth-Grey, 6th Earl of Stamford and 2nd Earl of Warrington (31 October 1765 – 26 April 1845), styled Lord Grey from 1768 to 1819, was a British peer and parliamentarian.

== Biography ==
Booth-Grey was the eldest son of George Grey, 5th Earl of Stamford and his wife, Henrietta Cavendish Bentinck.

He was educated at Winchester College and Trinity College, Cambridge. From 1790 to 1796, he was the Whig Member of Parliament for Aldeburgh. He contested both Grampound and St Germans, losing the former but representing the latter from 1796 to 1802.

In 1819 he succeeded his father as Earl of Stamford and Warrington, inheriting the family estates at Enville, Staffordshire, Bradgate Park in Leicestershire, Dunham Massey in Cheshire and Stalybridge in Lancashire. He was appointed Lord Lieutenant of Cheshire in 1819, and in 1827, succeeded George Cholmondeley, 1st Marquess of Cholmondeley as Vice-Admiral and Chamberlain of the county.

On 23 December 1797, Grey married Henrietta Charlotte Elizabeth Charteris, sister of Francis Douglas, 8th Earl of Wemyss.

They lived at Enville Hall, the family seat, and had five children:

- George Harry (1802–1835), later Baron Grey of Groby by writ of acceleration, married Catherine Charteris Wemyss in 1824, and had:
  - George Harry Booth-Grey, his successor
  - Margaret Henrietta Maria (1825–1852), married Henry John Milbank
- Henrietta Charlotte (1799–1866), married James Thomas Law (a priest; son of George Henry Law, Bishop of Chester and of Bath and Wells)
- Maria (17 December 1800 – 4 May 1821)
- Jane (1804–1877), married John Walsh (later Baron Ormathwaite).
- Henry Booth

On Stamford's death at Enville Hall in 1845, his senior titles devolved upon his grandson, George Grey who succeeded as the 7th and 3rd Earl, since his father who was summoned as the 8th Baron Grey of Groby in 1832 had predeceased him in 1835.

== See also ==
- Dunham Massey
- Earl of Warrington

Parliament of Great Britain
Preceded by Philip Crespigny; Samuel Salt	Member of Parliament for Aldeburgh; 1790–1796; With: Thomas Grenville	Succeeded by John Aubrey; Michael Angelo Taylor
Preceded by George Campbell, Marquess of Lorne; William Eliot	Member of Parliament for St Germans; 1796–1801; With: William Eliot	Parliament of the United Kingdom
Parliament of the United Kingdom
Parliament of Great Britain	Member of Parliament for St Germans; 1801–1802; With: William Eliot	Succeeded by Thomas Hamilton, Lord Binning; James Langham
Honorary titles
Preceded by George Grey, 5th Earl of Stamford	Lord Lieutenant of Cheshire; 1819–1845	Succeeded by Richard Grosvenor, 2nd Marquess of Westminster
Preceded by George Cholmondeley, 1st Marquess of Cholmondeley	Vice-Admiral and Chamberlain of Cheshire; 1827–1845	Vacant Title next held by Bertram Talbot, 17th Earl of Shrewsbury
Peerage of England
Preceded by George Grey	Earl of Stamford; 1819–1845	Succeeded by George Grey
Preceded by George Grey	Baron Grey of Groby (writ in acceleration); 1819–1833	Succeeded by George Grey
Peerage of Great Britain
Preceded by George Grey	Earl of Warrington; 1819–1845	Succeeded by George Grey
