= Henry Grey =

Henry Grey may refer to:

- Henry Grey, 4th (7th) Baron Grey of Codnor (1435–1496), English nobleman
- Henry Grey, 2nd Earl of Tankerville (1418/19–1449/50), English peer
- Henry Grey, Duke of Suffolk (1517–1554), English courtier and nobleman
- Henry Grey, 1st Baron Grey of Groby (1547–1614), English courtier, administrator and politician
- Henry Grey, 4th Earl of Kent (c.1495–1562)
- Henry Grey, 6th Earl of Kent (1541–1615), English peer
- Henry Grey, 8th Earl of Kent (c. 1583–1639)
- Henry Grey, 10th Earl of Kent (1594–1651), English politician
- Henry Grey, 1st Earl of Stamford (c. 1599–1673), English nobleman and military leader
- Henry Grey, 1st Duke of Kent (1671–1740), British politician and courtier
- Henry Grey (MP) (1683–1740), British politician
- Henry Grey (minister) (1778–1859), Scottish minister in the Church of Scotland
- Henry Grey, 3rd Earl Grey (1802–1894), English statesman
- R. Henry Grey (1891–1934), American actor
- Henry George Grey (1766–1845), British Army officer
- Henry M. Grey, English adventurer and author of travel literature

== See also ==
- Henry de Grey (died 1219), courtier of King John of England
- Harry Grey (disambiguation)
- Henry Gray (disambiguation)
