= Harry Grey, 3rd Earl of Stamford =

English peer

Harry Grey, 3rd Earl of Stamford (10 June 1685 – 16 November 1739), was an English peer. He was somewhat eccentric, displaying this mainly in the construction of whimsical buildings.

== Life ==
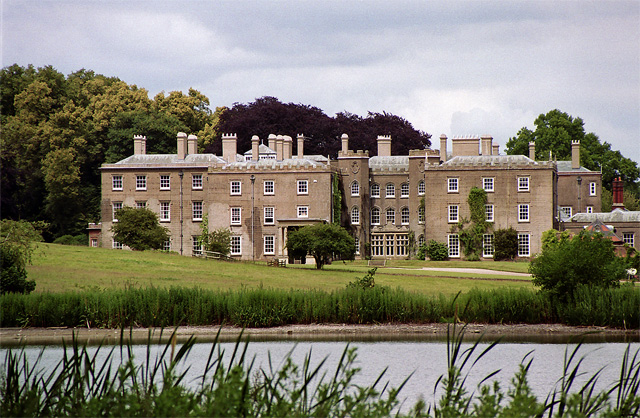
Enville Hall, Staffordshire

Harry Grey was born the eldest son of John Grey, who was the third son of Henry Grey, 1st Earl of Stamford. His mother was Catherine Ward, the daughter of Edward Ward, 7th Baron Dudley. He married, on 6 July 1704, Dorothy Wright, the daughter of Nathan Wright, and had seven children by her:

- Lady Dorothy Grey (15 September 1706 – 19 July 1781)
- Lady Catherine Grey (Bradgate House, 11 November 1711 – Velsen, 11 Apr 1748), who studied in Leiden. In 1735, she ran away with John William Trip (1716–1738), and married him in March 1736. In July 1736, their daughter, Petronella Johanna Wilhelmina, was born. As a mother and a widow, she secondly married Gillis van den Bempden (1697–1748), a wealthy and notorious burgomaster of Amsterdam, in January 1740.
- Harry Grey, 4th Earl of Stamford (1715–1768)
- Lady Diana Grey (1717 – 14 January 1780), who married 7 September 1736, George Middleton of Seaton and Fettercairn (d. 1772).
- Lady Jane Grey (1719 – 29 June 1752), who married in June 1738, George Drummond, 3rd of Blair Drummond.
- Lady Anne Grey (1721 – 9 October 1784), who married 9 October 1744, Sir Richard Acton, 5th Baronet.
- Hon. John Grey (1724 – 25 February 1777)

In 1709, Henry inherited the estate at Enville in Staffordshire from a distant relative. In 1720, Henry succeeded as Earl of Stamford on the death of his first cousin, Thomas Grey, 2nd Earl of Stamford. He then inherited the Grey estates at Bradgate Park in Leicestershire, thus uniting the two Grey estates. Subsequently, he chose to live at Enville Hall, allowing the Bradgate Park house to fall into disrepair.

On his death, he was succeeded in the earldom by his eldest son, Henry Grey.

Peerage of England
Preceded by Thomas Grey	Earl of Stamford; 1720–1739	Succeeded by Harry Grey
