= Bradgate House =

Bradgate House may refer to:

- Bradgate House (16th century)
- Bradgate House (19th century)
