= Lady Grey =

Lady Grey may refer to:

== People ==
- Lady Jane Grey (c. 1537–1554), claimant to the Kingdom of England and Ireland who was known for the briefness of her reign over both (9 days)
  - Lady Mary Grey (1545–1578), younger sister of Lady Jane Grey, the third and youngest daughter of Henry Grey, 1st Duke of Suffolk and Lady Frances Brandon
  - Lady Katherine Grey (1540–1568), younger sister of Lady Jane Grey and a cousin of Elizabeth I of England
- Lady Eliza Lucy Grey (1823–1898), daughter of Captain Sir Richard Spencer and the wife of Sir George Grey
- Anne Brandon, Baroness Grey of Powys (c. 1507–1558)
- Lady Grey, president of the Girls' Friendly Society 1883–1889, wife of Admiral Sir Frederick Grey, born Barbarina Charlotte Sullivan
- Lady Mary Grey, daughter of Martha Grey, Countess of Stamford and Harry Grey, 8th Earl of Stamford
- Lady Grey, any female holder of the title Baron Grey of Ruthin
- Lady Grey, any wife of a holder of the title Earl Grey
- Lady Grey, any wife of a holder of the title Baron Grey

== Arts and entertainment ==
- Lady Grey, 1980 movie starring Ginger Alden
- Ladygrey, 2015 French film starring Peter Sarsgaard
- Lady Grey (comics), a fictional character in Marvel Comics
- Lady Grey, a fictional evil temptress and mayor in the video game Fable

== Other uses ==
- Lady Grey (tea), a blend of tea by Twinings
- Lady Grey, Eastern Cape, a small town in the Eastern Cape of South Africa
- Lady Grey Elementary School, a school in British Columbia

== See also ==
- Lord Grey (disambiguation)
