= George Grey, 8th Baron Grey of Groby =

British noble

The Right Honourable The Baron Grey of Groby
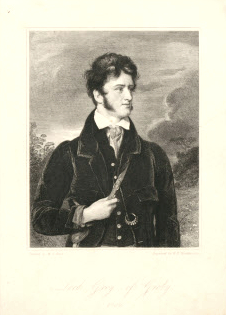
- George Harry Grey, 1829 engraving

Personal details
- Born: 5 April 1802
- Died: 24 October 1835 (aged 33)
- Spouse: Katherine Wemyss (m. 1824)
- Children: 1+, including George
- Parent: George Grey (father)
- Relatives: Francis Charteris (grandfather); George Grey (grandfather)

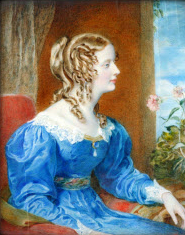
Katherine Wemyss-Charteris-Douglas, 1827 portrait

George Harry Grey, 8th Baron Grey of Groby (5 April 1802 – 24 October 1835), was a British peer.

== Biography ==
Grey was the son of George Grey, 6th Earl of Stamford, by the Honourable Henrietta Charlotte Elizabeth Charteris, daughter of Francis Charteris, Lord Elcho. In December 1832 he was summoned to the House of Lords through a writ of acceleration in his father's junior title of Baron Grey of Groby.

Lord Grey married his first cousin Lady Katherine Charteris Wemyss, daughter of Francis Douglas, 8th Earl of Wemyss, in 1824. He died in October 1835, aged 33, predeceasing his father. As he died before his father he is held to have become the 8th Baron Grey. His son George succeeded in the earldom in 1845. Lady Grey died in January 1844, aged 42.

Peerage of England
| Preceded by George Grey | Baron Grey (of Groby) (by writ of acceleration); 1833–1835 | Succeeded by George Grey |
