= Lord Grey =

Lord Grey may refer to:

- Thomas Grey, Lord Grey of Groby (ca. 1623–1657), MP for Leicester during the English Long Parliament, supported the Parliamentary cause in the Civil War and was a regicide
- Edward Grey, 1st Viscount Grey of Fallodon (1862–1933), British Foreign Secretary, 1905–1916
- Baron Grey (disambiguation), the title of several different lines of the British peerage
- Earl Grey, a title in the Peerage of the United Kingdom
  - Charles Grey, 2nd Earl Grey (1764–1845), British prime minister, 1830–1834

== See also ==
- Lord Gray, a title in the Peerage of Scotland
- Lady Grey (disambiguation)
