= George Grey, 5th Earl of Stamford =

British nobleman

The Right Honourable The Earl of Stamford
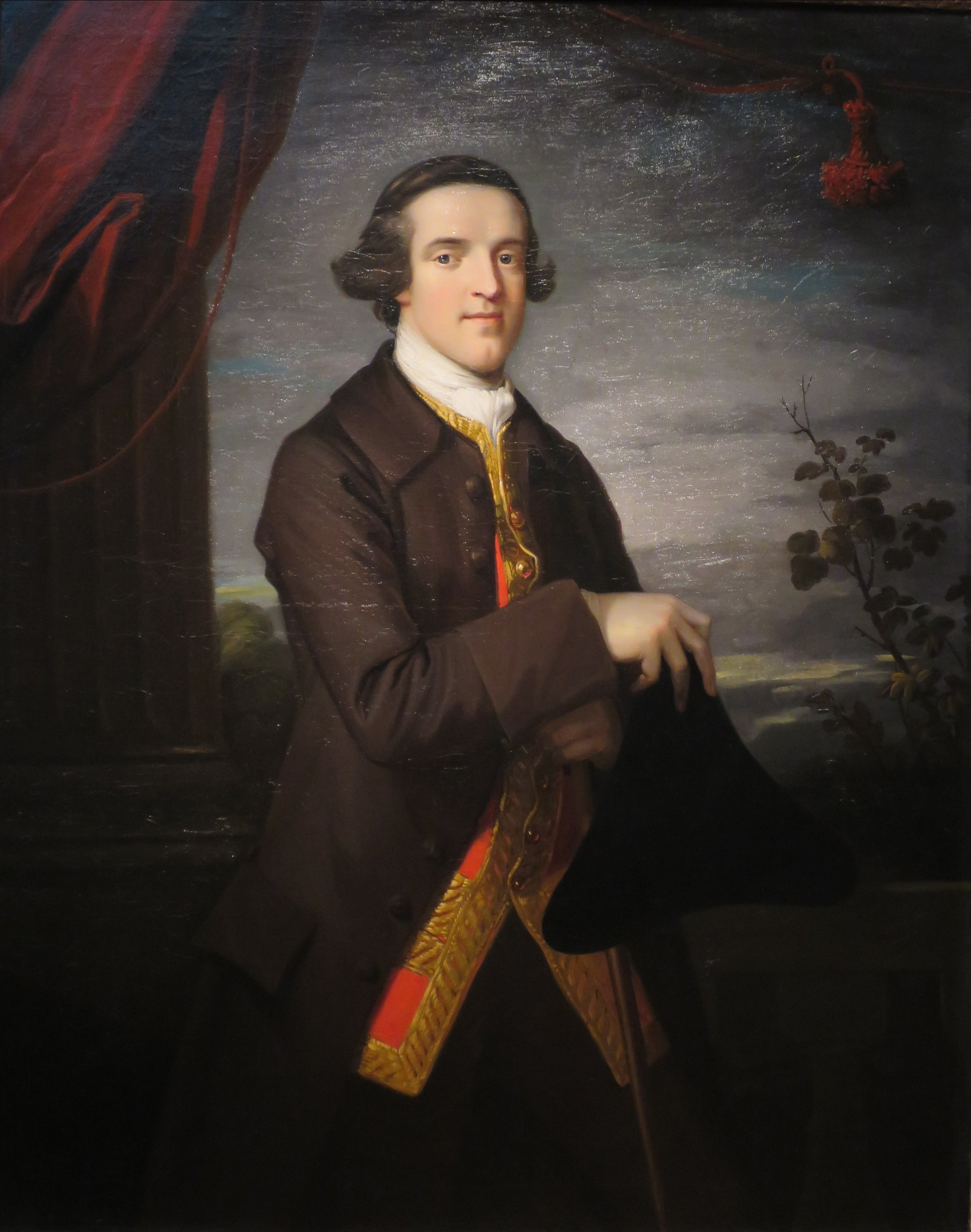

1st Earl of Warrington
- In office 1796–1819

5th Earl of Stamford
- In office 1768–1819

Member of the British Parliament for Staffordshire
- In office 1761–1768

Personal details
- Born: George Harry Grey; 1 October 1737
- Died: 28 May 1819 (aged 81) Enville Hall, Staffordshire
- Spouse: Lady Henrietta Bentinck (m. 1768)
- Children: 9, including George Grey, 6th Earl of Stamford
- Parents: Harry Grey, 4th Earl of Stamford (father); Lady Mary Booth (mother)
- Education: Queens' College, Cambridge

Arms of Grey: Barry of six Argent and Azure

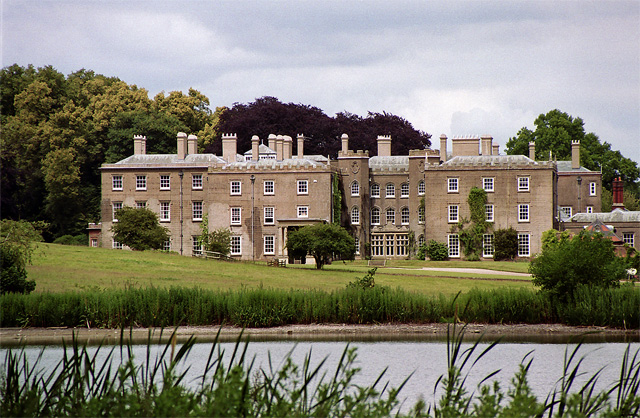
Enville Hall, Staffordshire

George Harry Grey, 5th Earl of Stamford (1 October 1737 – 28 May 1819), styled Lord Grey from 1739–68, was a British nobleman who succeeded his father as the Earl of Stamford. In 1796, his maternal grandfather's peerage titles Earl of Warrington and Baron Delamer were revived for him.

== Early life and education ==
Grey was born in 1737, the eldest son and heir of Harry Grey, 4th Earl of Stamford by his wife, Lady Mary, only daughter and heiress of George Booth, 2nd Earl of Warrington. He was baptised on 21 October at Newtown Linford, Leicestershire. Educated at Leicester School, he went up to Queens' College, Cambridge. where he matriculated in the Michaelmas term 1755, graduating MA in 1758.

== Career ==
On 22 September 1761, Lord Grey was a Page of Honour at coronation of George III.

Lord Grey served as Whig MP for Staffordshire from 1761 until 1768, when succeeded to his father's earldom and took his seat in the House of Lords.

He was Colonel of the Royal Chester Regiment of Militia from 1764, and Lord Lieutenant from 1783.

His brother-in-law, William Cavendish-Bentinck, 3rd Duke of Portland, while Prime Minister, suggested that Stamford should also become a peer of Great Britain in addition to being an English peer. He accepted an earldom in 1796 from Portland's successor William Pitt the Younger, rather than the reported previous offer of a marquessate; in the absence of there being another dukedom in keeping with Grey family tradition (cf Henry Grey, 1st Duke of Suffolk), Stamford deemed it better to preserve the memory of his grandmother's whose estates he had inherited. Thus he received the additional titles of Baron Delamer and Earl of Warrington (in the peerage of Great Britain) in recognition of the Booth family.

== Estates ==
Stamford modernised the family's Staffordshire seat at Enville Hall to the design of Thomas Hope. He promoted the development of the town of Ashton-under-Lyne (where he had appointed his cousin, George Booth as Rector) near Manchester, on land inherited from the Earls of Warrington.

The Grey family owned large tracts of land at Enville in Staffordshire and Bradgate Park in Leicestershire, and his mother had inherited Dunham Massey Hall and land in Stalybridge.

== Marriage and issue ==
On 28 May 1763, Grey married Lady Henrietta, second daughter of William Bentinck, 2nd Duke of Portland and the art collector Margaret Bentinck, Duchess of Portland, only daughter and heiress of Edward Harley, 2nd Earl of Oxford and Earl Mortimer at Stamford House, Whitehall, and registry office, Westminster, having nine children including:

- Lady Henrietta Grey (1764–1826), married John Chetwode
- George Grey, 6th Earl of Stamford (1765–1845), his successor in the family titles; married Lady Henrietta Charteris, daughter of Francis, Lord Elcho
- Hon. Marie Booth Grey (2 November 1767 – 21 November 1767), died in infancy
- Lady Maria Grey (1769–1838), married John Cotes MP
- Lady Louisa Booth Grey (1771–1830), died unmarried
- Hon. William Booth Grey (1773–1852), married first Frances Anne Pryce, heiress of Duffryn; married second Hon. Frances Somerville, sister of 16th Lord Somerville
- Hon. Rev. Anchitel Grey (1774–1833), a prebendary of Durham, died unmarried
- Capt. Hon. Henry Grey RN (1776–1799), died after being shipwrecked on board HMS Weazle (1783) in Barnstaple Bay
- Lady Sophia Grey (1777–1849), married her cousin, Booth Grey MP, of Ashton Hayes
- Lady Amelia Grey (1779–1849), married John Lister Kaye

On his death in 1819 at Enville Hall, he was succeeded by his eldest son.

== See also ==
- Dunham Massey

Parliament of Great Britain
| Preceded by Henry Thynne; William Bagot | Member of Parliament for Staffordshire; 1761–1768; With: William Bagot | Succeeded by John Wrottesley; William Bagot |
Honorary titles
| Preceded by George Cholmondeley, 1st Marquess of Cholmondeley | Lord Lieutenant of Cheshire; 1783–1819 | Succeeded by George Harry Grey, 6th Earl of Stamford |
Peerage of England
| Preceded by Harry Grey | Earl of Stamford; 1768–1819 | Succeeded by George Grey |
Peerage of Great Britain
| New creation | Earl of Warrington; 1796–1819 | Succeeded by George Grey |
