= Earl of Stamford =

Title in the peerage of England

Earldom of Stamford
- Barry of six argent and azure in chief three torteaux
- Creation date: 26 March 1628
- Created by: Charles I
- Peerage: Peerage of England
- First holder: Henry Grey, 2nd Baron Grey of Groby
- Last holder: Roger Grey, 10th Earl of Stamford
- Remainder to: Heirs male of the first earl's body lawfully begotten
- Subsidiary titles: Baron Grey of Groby
- Extinction date: 18 August 1976
- Former seats: Dunham Massey Hall; Enville Hall; Bradgate House (original); Bradgate House (replacement)
- Motto: A ma puissance ("According to my power")

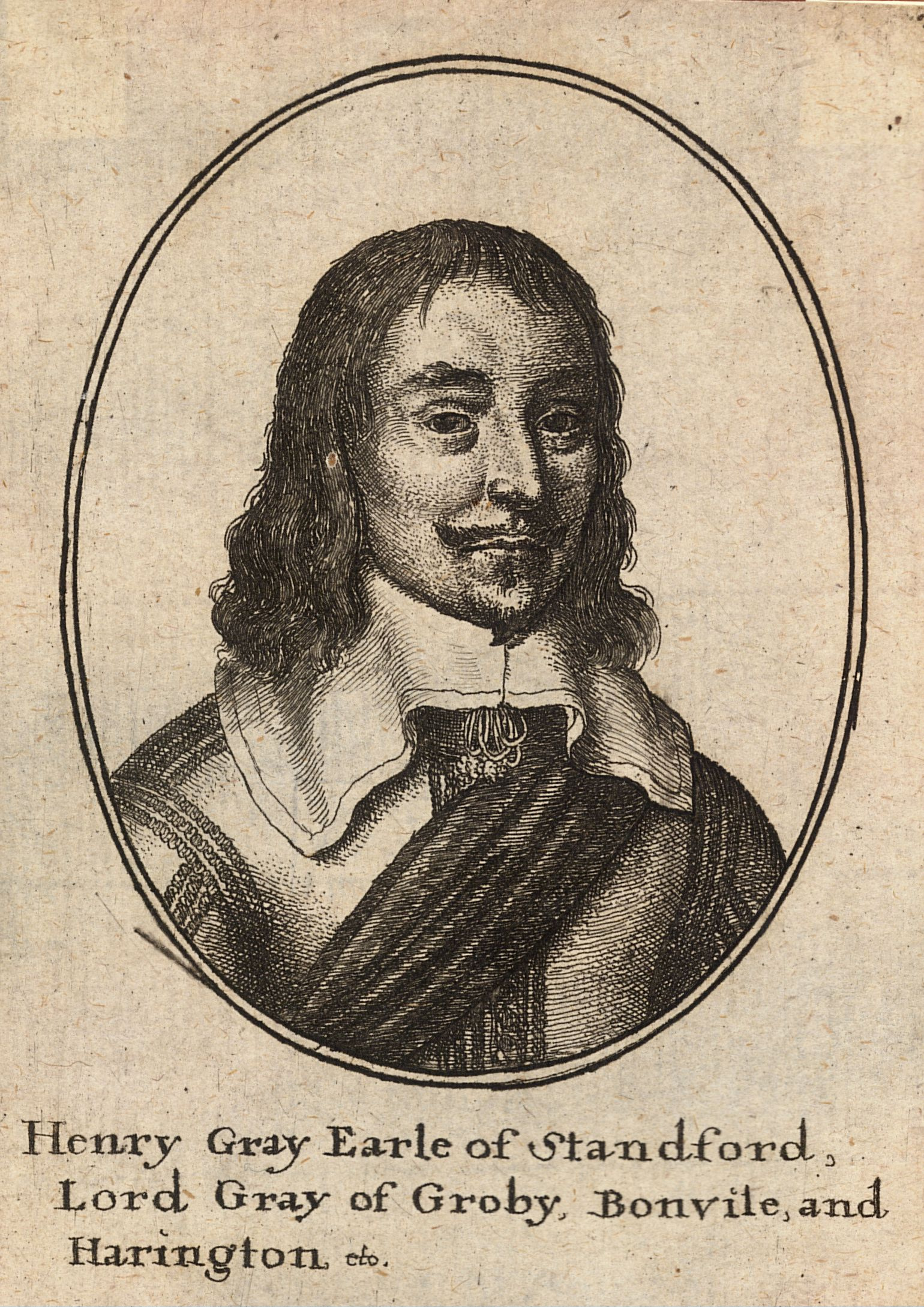
Henry Grey, 1st Earl of Stamford

Earl of Stamford was a title in the Peerage of England. It was created in 1628 for Henry Grey, 2nd Baron Grey of Groby. This Grey family descended through Lord John Grey, of Pirgo, Essex, younger son of Thomas Grey, 2nd Marquess of Dorset, and younger brother of Henry Grey, 1st Duke of Suffolk (father of Lady Jane Grey); Suffolk was executed for treason in 1554 forfeiting his titles (see the Duke of Suffolk for earlier history of the family).

== History ==
Lord John Grey's son Sir Henry Grey was in 1603 raised to the Peerage of England as Baron Grey of Groby, in the County of Leicester. He was succeeded by his grandson, the second Baron, who was created Earl of Stamford in the Peerage of England in 1628. Lord Stamford later fought as a Parliamentarian in the Civil War. His eldest son Thomas Grey, Lord Grey of Groby, was a leading Parliamentarian in the Civil War. Stamford was one of the judges at the trial of Charles I and one of the regicides who signed the King's death warrant. He predeceased his father and never succeeded to the earldom. Lord Stamford's daughter Lady Elizabeth Grey married George Booth, 1st Baron Delamer, and was the mother of Henry Booth, 1st Earl of Warrington. Stamford was succeeded by his grandson Thomas, the second Earl and the only son of Lord Grey of Groby. Thomas Grey was a politician and served as Chancellor of the Duchy of Lancaster and as President of the Board of Trade. He was childless and on his death in 1720 the titles passed to his first cousin Harry, the third Earl. He was the son of the Hon. John Grey, younger son of the first Earl.

The Grey-Booth arms, borne by the sixth and seventh earls of Stamford: Quarterly: first and fourth, barry of six, argent and azure, for Grey, second and third, argent three boars' heads, couped and erect, sable for Booth

He was succeeded by his son, the fourth Earl. He briefly represented Leicestershire in the House of Commons. Lord Stamford married his second cousin once removed Lady Mary Booth, daughter of George Booth, 2nd Earl of Warrington (on whose death in 1758 the earldom of Warrington became extinct). When Harry Grey, 4th Earl of Stamford died the titles passed to his son, George Grey, the fifth Earl; he sat as Member of Parliament for Staffordshire and served as Lord-Lieutenant of Cheshire. In 1796 the barony of Delamer (which became extinct in 1770) and earldom of Warrington held by his mother's family was revived by his creation as Baron Delamer and Earl of Warrington in the Peerage of Great Britain - he refused the offer of a marquessate, so as to become known as the Earl of Stamford and Warrington in recognition of the great estates he had inherited from the Booth family. He was succeeded by his son, George Grey, the sixth Earl. He represented Aldborough and St Germans in Parliament and was Lord-Lieutenant of Cheshire. His son styled Lord Grey of Groby (1802–1835), was summoned to the House of Lords by a writ of acceleration in his father's subsidiary title of Baron Grey of Groby in 1833; he, however, predeceased his father. Lord Stamford was therefore succeeded by his grandson, George Grey, the seventh Earl. He was the son of Lord Grey of Groby and had already succeeded as ninth Baron Grey of Groby on his father's death. Lord Stamford was a great patron of the Turf. On his death in 1883, the barony of Delamer and earldom of Warrington became extinct (although his wife remained Countess of Stamford and Warrington until her death in 1905).

The seventh Earl was succeeded in the barony of Grey of Groby and the earldom of Stamford by his third cousin once removed the Reverend Harry Grey, as eighth Earl. He was the son of the Reverend Harry Grey, son of the Hon. John Grey, third son of the fourth Earl. He lived in South Africa, and had married his housekeeper Martha Solomons after she had already given birth to two of his children, the elder of whom was a boy. As this son was born before the date of his father's marriage, his illegitimacy prevented his inheriting the title; while a third child, born after the marriage and therefore legitimate, could not inherit the earldom because she was female. More information on this episode can be found in Enthusiasms, essays by the historian Mark Girouard.

The eighth Earl was succeeded by his nephew, William Grey, the ninth Earl. However, it was not until 1892 that the Committee for Privileges of the House of Lords confirmed the latter in the title, as the Committee wished to be assured that the marriage contracted by the eighth Earl while he lived abroad had not produced a legitimate heir. On the ninth Earl's death the titles passed to his son, Roger Grey, the tenth Earl. He served briefly as Parliamentary Private Secretary (unpaid) to the Secretary of State for India, Lord Peel, in 1922 and was also Mayor of Altrincham from 1937 to 1938. Lord Stamford never married and on his death in 1976 his family titles became extinct.

== Estates ==
The main family seat of the Earls of Stamford in later years was Dunham Massey Hall, near Altrincham, Cheshire. Dunham Massey was bequeathed to the National Trust by the 10th and last Earl.

Another ancestral seat of the Grey family was Enville Hall, Staffordshire, and the house is occupied by relatives of Catherine Cox, Countess of Stamford and Warrington born 11 October 1826 Sturminster Marshall, Dorset died 29 January 1905 Bradgate House, Groby, Leicestershire. This was devised (bequeathed) by George Harry Grey, 7th Earl of Stamford to his great niece, Catherine Payne, who married Sir Henry Foley Lambert, 7th Baronet (who took the surname Grey) in 1905, and subsequently to his granddaughter. Catherine Payne was the granddaughter of Tamar Cox and a sister of Catherine, Countess of Stamford and Warrington, Catherine Payne's mother was the illegitimate daughter called Sarah Letitia Cox and was one of three illegitimate children born to Tamar Cox. Sarah Letitia Cox was brought up under the wing of her aunt Catherine, Countess of Stamford and Warrington and Catherine also took under her wing Robert Miller Cox illegitimate son of Tamar and who became the estate agent at Dunham Massey Hall.

The 7th Earl had a house which he called Bradgate House built in the village of Groby, Leicestershire and this was designed by the architect Mr. M.J. Dain of Dain and Parsons, London, and built by the local builder Mr. Thomas Rudkin; Bradgate House was completed in 1856 and was also built in the Jacobean style and it has been referred to as the Calendar House because it had 365 windows, 52 rooms, and 12 main chimneys.

Bradgate house in Bradgate park, Leicestershire is often confused with Bradgate House built in the 1850s in the village of Groby, Leicestershire.

== Titleholders ==
=== Barons Grey of Groby (1603) ===
- Henry Grey, 1st Baron Grey of Groby (1547–1614)
- Henry Grey, 2nd Baron Grey of Groby (c. 1600–1673) (created Earl of Stamford in 1628)

=== Earls of Stamford (1628) ===
- Henry Grey, 1st Earl of Stamford (c. 1600–1673)
  - Thomas Grey, Lord Grey of Groby (1623–1657)
- Thomas Grey, 2nd Earl of Stamford (c. 1653–1720)
- Henry Grey, 3rd Earl of Stamford (1685–1739)
- Harry Grey, 4th Earl of Stamford (1715–1768), married Lady Mary Booth in 1736
- George Harry Grey, 5th Earl of Stamford (1737–1819), created Earl of Warrington in 1796
- George Harry Grey, 6th Earl of Stamford, 2nd Earl of Warrington (1765–1845)
  - George Harry Grey, 8th Baron Grey of Groby (1802–1835)
- George Harry Grey, 7th Earl of Stamford, 3rd Earl of Warrington (1827–1883)
- Harry Grey, 8th Earl of Stamford (1812–1890), married Martha Solomons (1838-1916) in 1880
- William Grey, 9th Earl of Stamford (1850–1910)
- Roger Grey, 10th Earl of Stamford (1896–1976)

== See also ==
- Duke of Suffolk (1551 creation)
- Earl of Warrington
- Booth baronets
