= Listed buildings in Enville, Staffordshire =

Enville is a civil parish in the district of South Staffordshire, Staffordshire, England. It contains 44 listed buildings that are recorded in the National Heritage List for England. Of these, three are at Grade II*, the middle of the three grades, and the others are at Grade II, the lowest grade. The parish contains the village of Enville and the surrounding countryside. In the parish is Enville Hall, a country house, which is listed together with associated structures and buildings in its grounds. Most of the other listed buildings are houses and associated structures, cottages, farmhouses and farm buildings, the earlier of which are timber framed or have a timber framed core. The rest of the listed buildings include a church, items in the churchyard, a model farm, a watermill, a former smithy, two mileposts, and a telephone kiosk.

== Key ==
Grade	Criteria
II*	Particularly important buildings of more than special interest
II	Buildings of national importance and special interest

== Buildings ==
Name and location	Photograph	Date	Notes	Grade
St Mary's Church; 52.47916°N 2.26098°W		Early 12th century	The church was altered and extended during the following centuries, and in 1872–75 George Gilbert Scott restored and enlarged the church, including rebuilding the tower. The church is built in red sandstone with tile roofs, and consists of a nave with a western annexe, north and south aisles, a north porch, a chancel with a north vestry and organ chamber, and a southwest tower. The tower has three stages, angle buttresses, a south door, clock faces, a foliated frieze, an openwork embattled parapet that has corner pinnacles with crocketed spirelets, and hexagonal finials in the centre of each face and at the corners. The south arcade is Norman with round columns and scalloped capitals, and carved figures in two of the spandrels.	II*
Group of three grave covers 52.47917°N 2.26127°W	—	13th century	The three grave covers are in the churchyard of St Mary's Church. They are in stone, they are all aligned east–west and taper towards the east, and each is incised with a cross.	II
Coxgreen Farmhouse; 52.47413°N 2.28729°W	—	14th or 15th century	The farmhouse is timber framed with brick infill, part of the outer walls have been replaced in red brick, and it has a tile roof. There are two storeys and an attic, a three-storey gabled wing, the rear wing has two storeys, and there are six bays. The doorway has a Tudor arch, and the windows are chamfered and mullioned.	II
Churchyard cross 52.47909°N 2.26080°W	—	15th century	The remains of the cross are in the churchyard of St Mary's Church. They are in sandstone, and consist of a base on two steps, and the lower part of a cross with chamfered edges.	II
Crump Hillocks Farmhouse; 52.48535°N 2.29851°W	—	16th century	The farmhouse was altered and extended in the 17th century. The original part is timber framed with brick infill, additions and repairs are in red brick, and the roof is tiled. There is one storey and an attic, and an L-shaped plan, consisting of a main range and a projecting gabled wing. Some of the windows are mullioned with hood moulds. and others are casements with segmental heads, and there are two gabled dormers. At the rear is exposed timber framing.	II
Enville Hall; 52.47338°N 2.25972°W		16th century	A country house in Georgian style that ha been altered, remodelled and extended a number of times. It is built in roughcast brick with hipped slate roofs, and has a complex plan. The south front has a main block of three storeys and eleven bays, with an embattled parapet and corner finials. The middle five bays are recessed, with octagonal turrets in the angles. The windows are sashes with hood moulds, there is a bay window with a wavy parapet, and in the left wing is a porte-cochère with Ionic columns. The north front has nine bays, the middle three bays projecting under a pediment.	II
Hoo Farmhouse; 52.48749°N 2.24871°W	—	16th century	The farmhouse was extended in the 17th and 19th centuries. The 16th and 17th-century parts are timber framed, the infill and some replacement is in brick, and the 19th century part is in brick. There are two storeys, and a T-shaped plan. The early parts form the rear wing, which has three bays and contains casement windows. The later front range has three bays, and contains canted bay windows with hipped roofs, sash windows, and a central doorway with pilasters, a fanlight, and a pediment.	II
Mere Farmhouse; 52.49941°N 2.25490°W		Early 17th century	The farmhouse, which incorporates earlier material, is in red brick with a tile roof, and has a rear wing that is timber framed with brick infill. There are two storeys and an attic, a front of four bays, each of which has a crow-stepped gable and a finial, and two rear wings. On the front are two two-storey square bay windows with embattled parapets and a two-storey porch with a crow-stepped gable. The porch contain a segmental-headed opening, and the windows are mullioned, some also transomed with hood moulds. The timber framed rear wing has a jettied upper storey.	II
The Toys, Bridgnorth Road; 52.48451°N 2.28625°W	—	Early 17th century	The house was extended and altered in the 18th and 19th centuries. It is partly timber framed, and partly in brick, with fragments of a stone plinth, and it has a tile roof. There are two storeys with an attic, and an L-shaped plan, consisting of a two-bay range and a gabled cross-wing. On the front is a gabled porch with a segmental arch, most of the windows are sashes, and the gables have decorative bargeboards.	II
Bradbury's Farmhouse; 52.48272°N 2.29361°W	—	17th century	The remodelling of an earlier house, it was further altered and expanded in the 19th century. The house is timber framed and largely replaced in brick, and has a tile roof. There are two storeys and an attic, a main block with three bays, the middle bay projecting and gabled, a single-storey right extension, and a rear wing. The porch is in the middle bay, most of the windows are casementss, and in the rear wing is two-light chamfered mullioned window.	II
Barn, Crump Hillocks Farm; 52.48545°N 2.29827°W	—	17th century	The barn is timber framed with weatherboarding, and has a slate roof. There is one storey and three bays. In the centre are full-height barn doors.	II
Piccadilly Cottages (northeast); 52.49107°N 2.25362°W	—	17th century	The cottage, which was altered in the 18th century, is timber framed with brick infill, partly rebuilt in red brick with a dentiled eaves band, and with a tile roof. There is one storey and an attic, and two bays. The windows are casements with segmental heads, there are two gabled dormers, and a stair window.	II
Piccadilly Cottages (southwest); 52.49097°N 2.25376°W		17th century	A row of three timber framed cottages with brick infill, some rebuilding in brick, and a tile roof. They have one storey and an attic, and three bays. The windows are casements, and there is a central gabled dormer.	II
Warren Cottage, 13 Enville; 52.47919°N 2.25857°W	—	17th century	The house, which was extended in the 19th century, is timber framed with painted brick infill and a tile roof. The original part has one storey and an attic, and one gabled bay facing the road, with the attic jettied. The later part has two storeys and two bays, with gables and finials above the upper floor windows. The windows are casements.	II
Blundies Farmhouse; 52.48138°N 2.25572°W	—	Late 17th century	The farmhouse was extended in the 18th and 19th centuries. The original part is timber framed with brick infill, the extensions are in brick, and the roof is tiled. There are two storeys, the early range to the left is gabled, and the extensions form a two-bay range to the right. Some of the windows are sashes, but most are casements.	II
Leigh House Farmhouse; 52.47307°N 2.27061°W	—	Late 17th century	The main house was added to an earlier range, it was remodelled in the 18th century, and later extended. The farmhouse is in red brick with tile roofs, and has an irregular plan. The early range has one storey and an attic, and two bays, casement windows and gabled dormers. The main house has two storeys and an attic, storey bands, central pilaster buttresses, and three gabled dormers.	II
Newhouse Farmhouse; 52.48346°N 2.28249°W	—	Late 17th century	The farmhouse, which was altered in the 19th century, is in red brick on a stone coped plinth, with quoins, storey bands, an eaves band, and a tile roof. There are two storeys, an attic and a basement, two parallel ranges, and three bays. The central doorway has a rectangular fanlight and a triangular hood, it is flanked by blocked oval windows, and the other windows are sashes with segmental heads.	II
Rose Villa, Bridgnorth Road; 52.48604°N 2.28692°W	—	c. 1700	The house was enlarged in 1809. It is in stone and rendered brick, and has an eaves band, overhanging eaves with brackets, and a hipped slate roof. There are two storeys and five bays. In the centre is a doorway, the windows are sashes, and in the upper floor is a datestone.	II
Grove Farmhouse; 52.48891°N 2.29100°W	—	Early 18th century	A red brick farmhouse with storey bands, a dentilled eaves band, and a tile roof. There are two storeys and an attic, a main block of four bays, flanking wings each with one storey and an attic, and two bays, and four parallel rear wings. Two semicircular steps lead up to the central doorway that has pilasters and a pediment. The windows are casements with segmental heads, and there are two gabled dormers.	II
The Cottage, 2 Enville; 52.47712°N 2.25918°W	—	Early 18th century	A house in red brick with storey bands, an eaves band, and a tile roof. There are two storeys and an attic, two parallel ranges, and four bays. The windows are casements, and there are two gabled dormers.	II
The Establishment, Blundies Lane; 52.47935°N 2.25877°W	—	Early 18th century	A house, later used for other purposes, it is in red brick with storey bands, and a tile roof. There are two storeys and an attic, and an L-shaped plan, with a front range of three bays, and a two-storey, single-bay rear wing. The doorway has a triangular hood, and the windows are casements with segmental heads.	II
Home Farm, Enville Hall; 52.47085°N 2.25688°W	—	1747–48	A model farm consisting of a farmhouse, and farm buildings arranged around a rectangular courtyard, some of which have been demolished. They are in red brick with tile roofs. The farmhouse has three storeys and two bays, and a two-storey two-bay block to the right, and contains casement windows. The farm buildings have one storey and a loft, and contain openings with segmental heads including two cart entrances and a carriage entrance, and there are 13 tiers of vents.	II
Coach house and stable block, Enville Hall; 52.47340°N 2.25862°W		c. 1748–50 (probable)	The buildings are in red brick with hipped tile roofs, and form three ranges round a courtyard, and there is a second, later, courtyard to the north. The front of the east range has two storeys, giant corner pilasters, a coped parapet, and nine bays. The middle bay has a pediment, and contains a semicircular carriage arch with imposts, above which is a clock. The windows are casements with keystones, and on the roof is a cupola with semicircular arches, a ball finial and a weathervane. To the rear are the coach house wings.	II
The Museum, Enville Hall; 52.47474°N 2.26175°W		1750	A former summer house in the grounds of the hall, it was designed by Sanderson Miller in ornate Gothick style. There is one storey and three bays, the middle bay larger, all with moulded ogee arches on clustered columns with moulded bases and columns. In the middle bay is a doorway with flanking windows, all with ogee heads, and the outer bays contain sash windows with pointed heads. In the upper part of each bay is a rose window the middle one the largest. At the corners are buttresses, each with a double niche and a finial.	II*
Gate, gate piers, wall, and ha-ha, Enville Hall; 52.47279°N 2.25975°W		18th century	The garden wall and ha-ha are to the south and east of the hall, with a drive between them. The wall is in red brick with stone coping. At the entrance to the drive are cast iron gates flanked by piers with a square section and oversailing caps.	II
Ice House at N.G.R. SO 82908541; 52.46670°N 2.25308°W	—	18th century	The ice house in the grounds of Enville Hall is excavated out of natural sandstone. It is partly lined by brick, and has a square-headed doorway and a domed chamber.	II
Mere Hall; 52.50166°N 2.26281°W		Mid 18th century	A stable block, altered in the 18th and 19th centuries, and converted into a house. It is in red brick with stone dressings, on a plinth with moulded coping, pilasters, a sill band, and a tile roof. The main block has two storeys and five bays, there are flanking wings, each with four bays, the left bay with one storey and the right bay with two. In the wings are blind semicircular arches with imposts, some with inserted windows, and one with a conservatory. The central doorway has a rusticated architrave and a keystone, and most of the windows are sashes.	II
Barn north of Mere Hall; 52.50206°N 2.26290°W	—	Mid 18th century	The barn is in red brick with a corrugated iron roof. It has a T-shaped plan, with a main range of nine bays and a gabled rear wing. Apart from one bay at the west end, which has two storeys, the rest of the barn has a single storey. The openings, which have segmental heads, include cart entrances, doors, some of which are blocked, and a loft door.	II
Cartshed northeast of Mere Hall; 52.50207°N 2.26252°W	—	Mid 18th century	The cartshed is in red brick, with a dentilled eaves band, and a corrugated iron roof. There are two storeys and two bays. In each gable end are two cart entrances with semicircular arches and keystones, there is a window with a segmental head, and on the west side is a light of stone and brick steps leading up to an upper floor door.	II
Cartshed northwest of Mere Hall; 52.50202°N 2.26328°W	—	Mid 18th century	The cartshed is in red brick, with a corrugated iron roof. There are two storeys and two bays. In the north gable end are two cart entrances with semicircular arches, imposts, and keystones, above which are blocked openings with segmental heads. On the east side are two doors and a fixed-light window, all with segmental heads.	II
Lady Dorothy's Cottage; 52.47074°N 2.24217°W		1755	A school, later a private house, it is in red brick with stone dressings, an ogee-moulded eaves band, and a tile roof with coped verges. There are two storeys with an attic, two bays, and single-storey single-bay flanking wings. On the front is a central doorway that has a fanlight with a keystone and a bracketed pediment. At the rear are three bays, and corner pilasters with embattled parapets. In the centre is a staircase window with a keystone, and a lunette above. The other windows are casements with bracketed pediments.	II
Stable Court, Four Ashes Hall; 52.48702°N 2.29736°W	—	Mid to late 18th century	A range of farm buildings in red brick on a stone plinth with stone dressings, moulded eaves, a parapet cornice, and roofs of tile and Welsh slate with coped gables. The buildings form a courtyard plan, the stable range to the southeast, with two storeys and eleven bays, and a central semicircular arched entry over which is an octagonal lantern with a lead-covered dome.	II*
The Gothic Gateway, Enville Hall; 52.47091°N 2.26487°W	—	Mid to late 18th century	An eye-catcher designed by Sanderson Miller in Gothic style. It is in stone and has a central carriage arch with a dummy portcullis, an embattled gable, and flanking cylindrical turrets with corbelled and embattled caps and blind panels. The gateway is linked by low embattled walls to obliquely placed flanking pavilions that have arches, corner turrets, and corbelled and embattled parapets.	II
Former smithy northeast of 11 Enville; 52.47907°N 2.25879°W	—	Late 18th century	The former smithy is in red brick with a dentilled eaves band and a tile roof. It has one storey, and contains two segmental-headed casement windows and a stable-type door in the right gable end. To the right is a lower cartshed.	II
Shenstone's Chapel; 52.46527°N 2.26550°W		Late 18th century	A garden feature in the form of a Gothic chapel, it is in roughcast brick with a tile roof. The structure consists of a nave and a cylindrical tower. In the tower are cast iron windows with pointed heads, on each side of the nave is a doorway with a four-centred arch, and at the east end is an entrance with a pointed arch.	II
The Summerhouse, Enville Hall; 52.46923°N 2.26971°W	—	Late 18th century	The summer house is in the form of a temple, and is in red brick with stone dressings. It has one storey and three open bays. There are four square columns, a Doric entablature, and a semicircular arched opening at each end.	II
Mere Mill; 52.49508°N 2.26286°W	—	Early 19th century	A watermill in red brick with a tile roof. one storey and a loft. The openings have segmental heads, and there is a semicircular arch giving access to the mill wheel, which is a cast iron overshot wheel.	II
The Hollies Farmhouse; 52.46769°N 2.28853°W	—	Early 19th century	The farmhouse is in red and blue brick with a tile roof. There are three storeys, two parallel ranges, and three bays. The central doorway has pilasters, a fanlight, and a square pediment, and the windows are sashes with wedge lintels.	II
The Pagoda, Enville Hall; 52.47303°N 2.26773°W	—	Early to mid 19th century	A summer house in the grounds of the hall, it is in wood on a rendered brick plinth, and has a hipped felted roof with bracketed overhanging eaves. There is a cruciform plan, with a single storey and a central two-storey tower. Most of the wall space is occupied by arched windows, and inside are wooden side benches with cupboards beneath.	II
Fountain, Enville Hall; 52.47357°N 2.26151°W	—	Mid 19th century	The fountain is in a pool in the grounds of the hall, and is in stone or concrete. It depicts a triton and four horses with fish tails.	II
Four Ashes Hall and service range 52.48711°N 2.29593°W	—	Mid 19th century	A small county house incorporating earlier material. It is in red brick with stone dressings, and has a roof with coped gables and moulded kneelers. There is an L-shaped plan, and the main range has two storeys and an attic and six bays. The doorway is set in a pointed arch, the windows are mullioned and transomed, and there are gabled dormers. In the garden front are two two-storey bay windows, and attached to the north west is a service range enclosing a small courtyard.	II
Milepost at N.G.R. SO 80538754; 52.48585°N 2.28816°W		Late 19th century	The milepost is on the north side of the A458 road. It is in cast iron, and has a triangular section and a chamfered top. On the top face is the distance to London, and the other faces indicate the distances to Stourbridge and to "BRID" (Bridgnorth).	II
Milepost at N.G.R. SO 81698678; 52.47898°N 2.27032°W	—	Late 19th century	The milepost is on the north side of the A458 road. It is in cast iron, and has a triangular section and a chamfered top. On the top face is the distance to London, and the other faces indicate the distances to Stourbridge and to "BRID" (Bridgnorth).	II
Telephone Kiosk; 52.47908°N 2.25848°W	—	1935	A K6 type telephone kiosk, designed by Giles Gilbert Scott. It is in front of the Post Office, and is constructed in cast iron with a square plan and a dome. There are three unperforated crowns in the top panels.	II
