= Henry Gray (disambiguation) =

Henry Gray (1827–1861) was an English surgeon and writer of the medical book, Gray's Anatomy.

Henry Gray may also refer to:

- Henry Gray (MP), in 1450 MP for Norfolk
- Henry Gray (bishop) (1873–1939), Anglican bishop in Canada
- Henry Gray (musician) (1925–2020), American blues piano player and singer
- Henry Gray (politician) (1816–1892), member of the Confederate Congress and army general from Louisiana during the American Civil War
- Henry Gray (Scottish surgeon) (1870–1938), Scottish surgeon
- Henry B. Gray (1867–1919), Lieutenant Governor of Alabama
- Henry Peters Gray (1819–1877), artist
- Henry Gray (footballer) (born 2005), New Zealand footballer

== See also ==
- Henry Grey (disambiguation)
- Harry Gray (disambiguation)
