= Harry Gray =

Harry Gray may refer to:

- Harry Gray (business executive) (1919–2009), American business executive
- Harry B. Gray (born 1935), American chemist
- Harry Gray (sculptor) (fl. c. 2000), British sculptor of Battle of Britain Memorial, Capel-le-Ferne
- Harry Gray (hurler) (1915–1978), Irish hurler
- Harry Gray (Australian footballer) (1916–1989), Australian rules footballer
- Harry Gray (footballer, born 2007), English association football midfielder for Swindon Town
- Harry Gray (footballer, born 2008), English association football forward for Leeds United

== See also ==
- Henry Gray (disambiguation)
- Harry Grey (disambiguation)
- Harold Gray (1894–1968), American newspaper artist and cartoonist
- Harry De Gray (1866–1952), chairman of the Shanghai Municipal Council
