= Harry Grey, 8th Earl of Stamford =

British aristocrat and clergyman

The Right Honourable The Earl of Stamford

Personal details
- Born: 26 February 1812 England
- Died: 19 June 1890 (aged 78) Wynberg, Cape Colony, British Empire
- Spouse(s): Susan Gaydon (m. 1844–1869) Ann McNamara (m. 1872–1874) Martha Solomons (m. 1880–1890)
- Children: Emma Collins; John Grey; Frances Grey; Lady Mary Grey
- Parent(s): Harry Grey; Frances Elizabeth Ellis
- Education: Sherborne School; University of Oxford
- Occupation: clergyman, farm labourer, miner

Harry Grey, 8th Earl of Stamford (26 February 1812 – 19 June 1890) was an English peer and Anglican clergyman.

== Biography ==
Harry Grey was born in England, the son of Revd. Harry Grey (1783–1860) and Frances Elizabeth Ellis. His grandfather was the Hon. John Grey, son of Harry Grey, 4th Earl of Stamford.

He was educated at Sherborne and at Oxford, well-schooled in the classics, including Latin, Greek, Theology and Philosophy. In 1836, he took Holy Orders in the Church of England. He married in Devon in 1844 to the "lower class" Susan Gaydon, but later developed a serious drink and gambling problem. He was sent to the Cape Colony as a remittance man, leaving his wife behind receiving a monthly stipend. It seems that there was an arrangement between them, and that she was not displeased with this development, having formed an attachment with a more suitable partner.

Once in the Cape Colony, he stayed in the historic Cape Town suburb of Wynberg, and then worked as a miner in Namaqualand. Later he was, by all accounts, a farm labourer just outside the hamlet of Wellington. His first wife died in Devon in 1869. After siring a child, Emma, with Caroline Collins, he remarried in 1872 in the Cape Colony. Ann McNamara, his second wife, was suffering from tuberculosis and he engaged his future third wife, Martha Solomons, as a nursemaid. Martha was the daughter of a Cape freed slave whom he had met a decade before in Wellington. When his second wife died in 1874, Harry Grey entered into a relationship with Martha which led to the birth of a son, John, in 1879, and a daughter, Frances. He married Martha in 1880 to legitimise the two children. In 1882, the couple had a further daughter, who would become Lady Mary Grey. The middle daughter of Harry Grey and Martha Solomons died of smallpox at an early age, which coincided with Harry Grey becoming Earl.

On the accidental death of his second cousin once removed, George Grey, 7th Earl of Stamford, in 1883, he inherited the titles of Earl of Stamford and Baron Grey of Groby, and the estate (which was the ancient "family seat") at Dunham Massey in Cheshire. In 1885, he gave up 250 acres (1.0 km^{2}) of the land to develop the industrial estate of Broadheath in Altrincham. He and his wife chose to remain in Wynberg, Cape Town, and he never returned to the United Kingdom.

On his death in 1890, the title of 9th Earl and the traditional parliamentary seat in the House of Lords was disputed. Although John Grey was Harry's son and heir according to the law and custom of the Cape Colony, the claim was deemed invalid as, under English law, the later marriage of parents did not legitimise any child born prior to their legal union. (John's younger sister, Mary, having been born after her parents' marriage, was legitimate under English law and therefore known as Lady Mary Grey. However, she could not inherit titles which passed down the male line.) A court case ensued and the title passed to Harry's first cousin, William Grey, 9th Earl of Stamford, who had lived in Barbados for many years.

The Stamford lineage died out in 1976 with the death of the 10th Earl. Today, Dunham Massey is a tourist attraction owned by the National Trust.

Peerage of England
Preceded by George Grey	Earl of Stamford; 1883–1890	Succeeded by William Grey
