= Bradgate House, Bradgate Park =

16th-century ruin in Leicestershire, England

Coordinates: 52.686595°N 1.211162°W

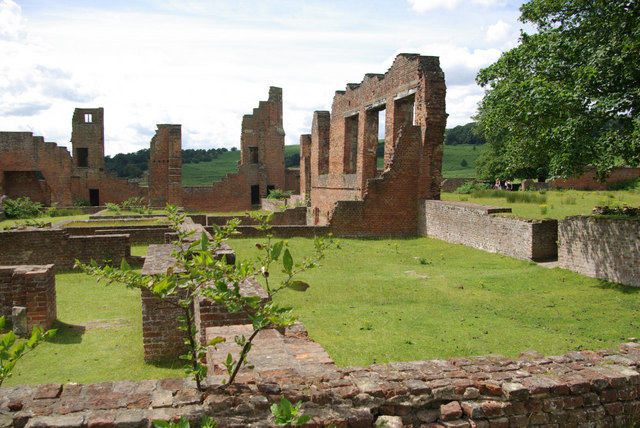
Bradgate House ruins

Bradgate House is a 16th-century ruin in Bradgate Park, Leicestershire, England.

== History ==
Edward Grey's son Sir John Grey of Groby married Elizabeth Woodville, who, after John's death married King Edward IV. Their son Thomas Grey, 1st Marquess of Dorset, made preparations for building the first Bradgate House in the late 15th century but died before work began. It was his son, the 2nd Marquess of Dorset, who built the first Bradgate House, completing it circa 1520. This is one of the first unfortified great houses in England and one of the earliest post-Roman use of bricks. It was lived in by the Grey family for the next 220 years. It is believed that the house was the birthplace of Lady Jane Grey, later Queen, ruling for a mere 9 days before being overthrown by Mary I. After Jane and her father, the 1st Duke of Suffolk, were executed in 1554, the estate passed to the Crown. Local history claims that groundskeepers marked the occasion of Jane's execution by pollarding the estate's oak trees in a symbolic beheading. Examples of pollarded oaks can still be seen in the park. In 1563 the family regained favour, and the Groby manor, including Bradgate, was restored to Jane's uncle, Lord John Grey of Pirgo. His great-grandson was made Earl of Stamford. Later earls acquired estates in Enville, Staffordshire, and Dunham Massey, Cheshire.

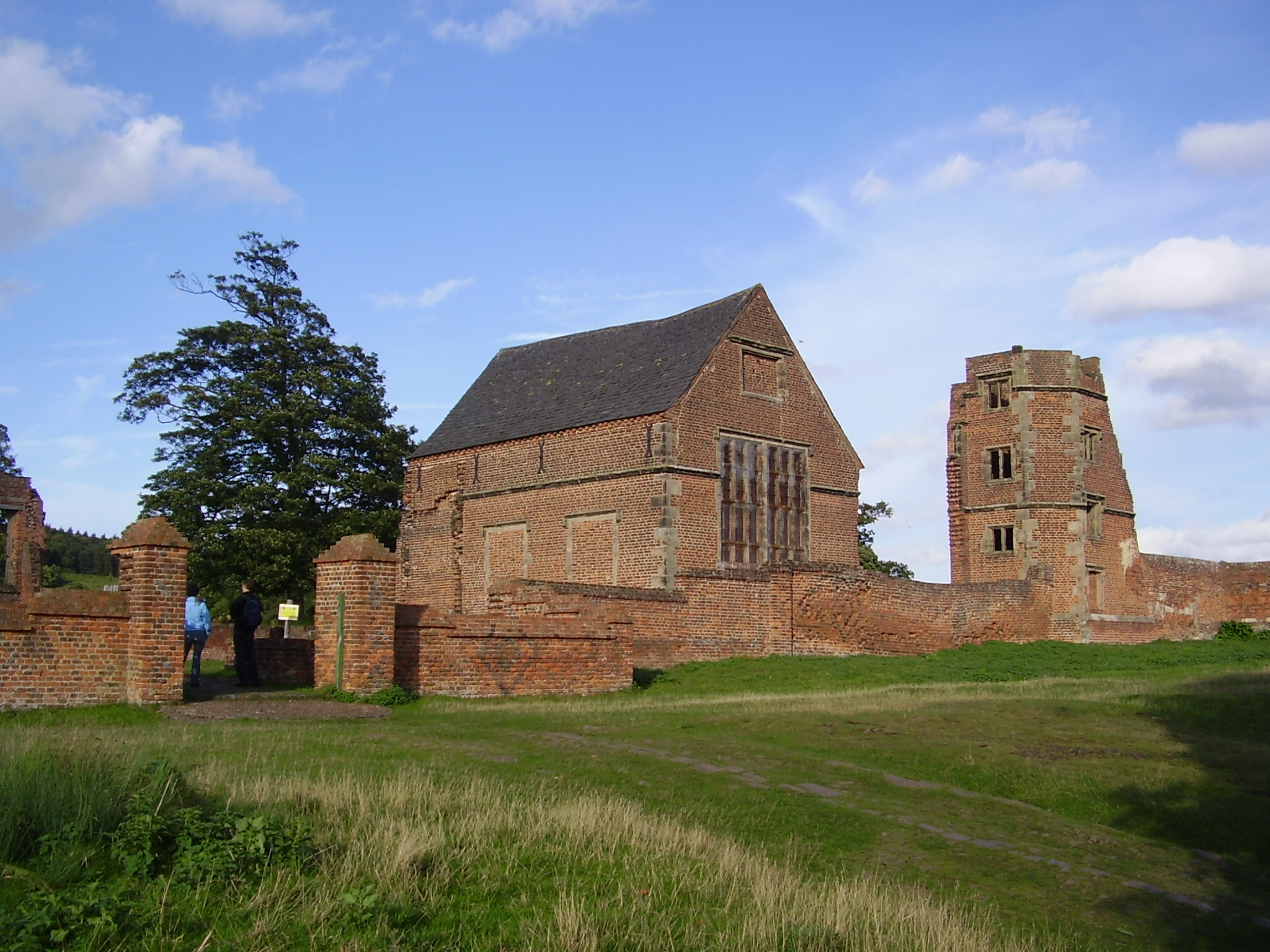
Bradgate House's ruined chapel and tower

Sometime after 1739 they moved out of Bradgate, which began a long decline. The spectacular ruins of the house are still visible at the centre of the park. The house was approximately 200 feet (61 m) long, featuring a main hall measuring 80 by 30 feet (24.4 m × 9.1 m). As well as considerable remains of walls and fireplaces, it has four truncated towers and the chapel is still intact, containing a tomb effigy to the 1st Earl of Stamford and his wife.

In the mid-19th century, George Harry Grey and the 7th Earl of Stamford and Warrington commissioned a new house to be built designed by the architect Mr M.J. Dain of Dain and Parsons, London, and built by the local builder Mr Thomas Rudkin. The new Bradgate House was completed in 1856 near the village of Groby, Leicestershire, and built in the Jacobean style. It has been referred to as the Calendar House because it had 365 windows, 52 rooms, and 12 main chimneys. The new house was demolished in the mid-1920s when the Leicestershire estates were sold by the late Earl's niece Katherine Henrietta Venezia Grey, who incidentally changed her surname to Grey on the condition of her inheritance of the estates from her deceased uncle. The new Bradgate House near the village of Groby is frequently confused with the 16th-century ruined house of the same name in Bradgate Park 2 miles in distance.

== See also ==
- Bradgate House (19th century)
