= Henry M. Grey =

English adventurer and author

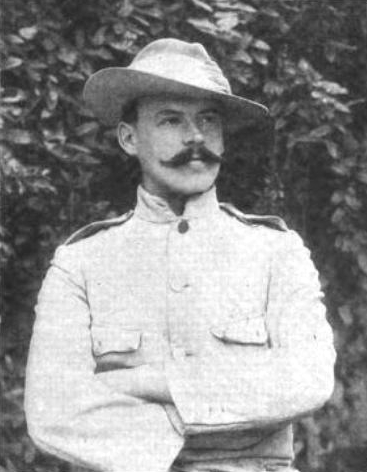
In The Sketch, 7 December 1898

Henry Myers Grey (1867–1937) was a late 19th-century and early 20th-century English adventurer, journalist and author of travel literature.

He was born in Rochdale, Lancashire. He died in London in 1937.

== Works ==
- Lloyd's Yesterday and To-day (1893). Illus. William Douglas Almond.
- In Moorish captivity : an account of the "Tourmaline" expedition to Sus, 1897-98 (1899). Illus. Arthur Twidle. From Internet Archive.
- The Land of To-Morrow: a mule-back trek through the swamps and forests of eastern Bolivia (1927).
