= Earl de Grey, Kingston upon Hull =

19th-century pub in Yorkshire, England

Coordinates: 53.741209°N 0.341095°W

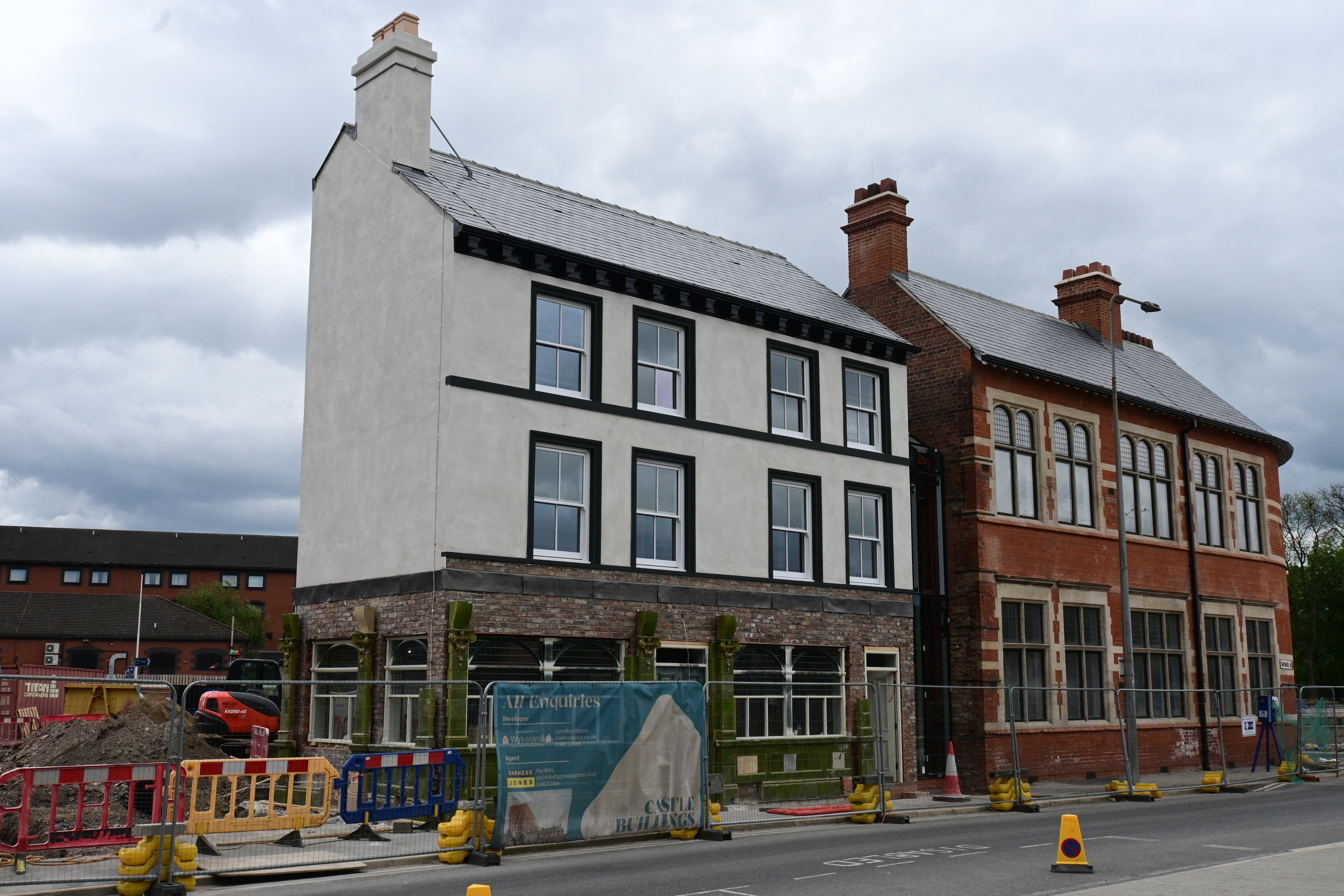
The Earl de Grey under reconstruction on Waterhouse Lane in June 2025

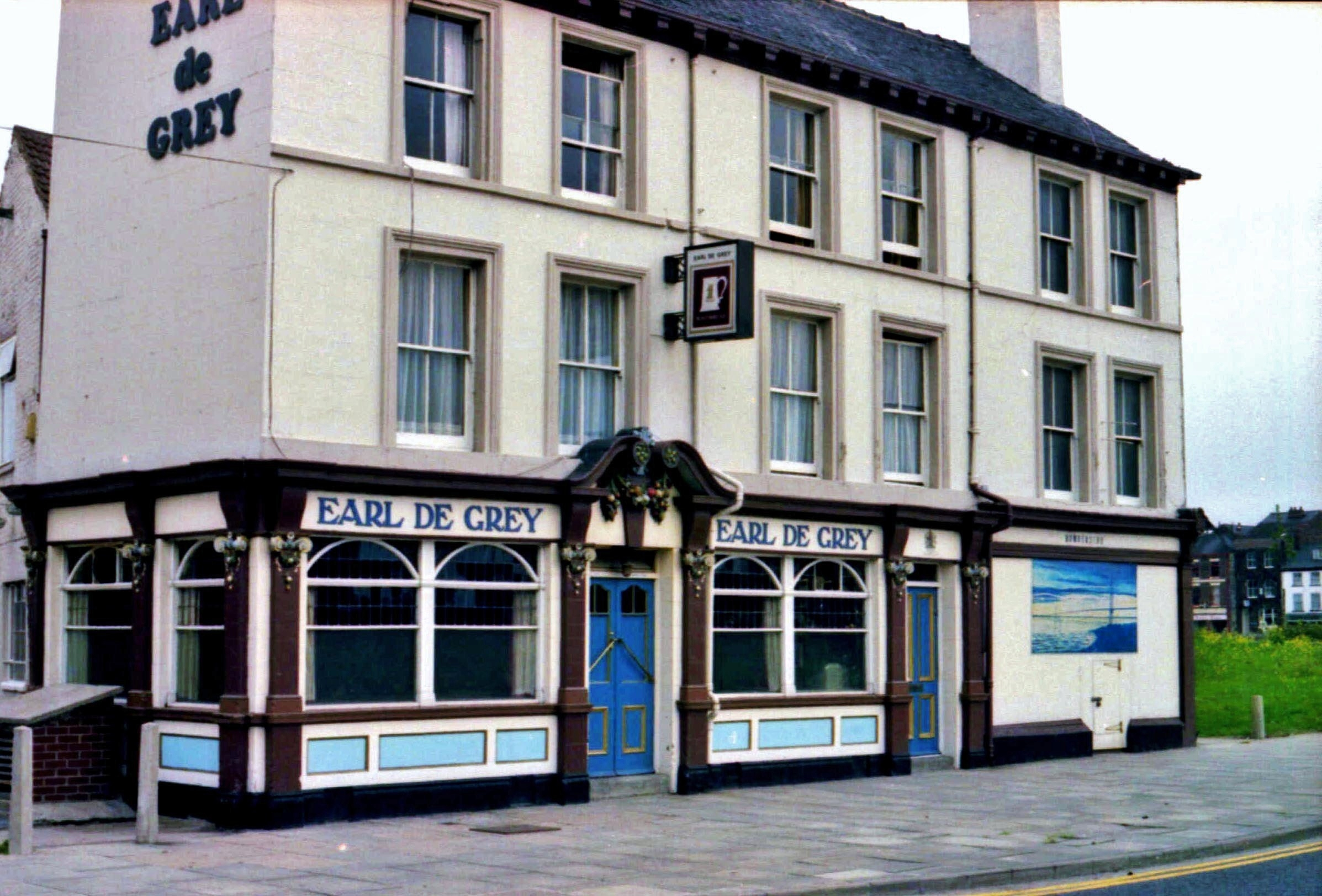
The Earl de Grey in its original location on Castle Street in 1982

The Earl de Grey is a pub constructed in the early 19th century in the centre of Kingston upon Hull, England. The building is three storeys high with a slate roof. It had green faience (tiling) covering the front of the ground floor, which was added around 1913, decorated with Ionic pilasters. Cream-coloured fascia above the ground-floor windows featured "EARL DE GREY" signage.

The first records of the pub appear in 1831, when it was originally named "Junction Dock Tavern"; it was renamed in the 1860s after the Earl de Grey at the time, George Robinson, 1st Marquess of Ripon. The Earl de Grey was popular with seafarers, being located close to the docks and in what was at the time Hull's red-light district.

The faience of the ground floor was likely added around 1913, when the interior was renovated by the then owner, Bentley's Yorkshire Brewery. The exterior of the building was given grade II listed status for its historic value in 1994. Since then, it has had extended periods of closure and disuse.

According to a local legend, in the 1980s, the pub was home to two parrots, Cha Cha and Ringo. A burglar broke in, and fearing that the parrots would alert the pub's landlord, stabbed Cha Cha to death. Following the ordeal, Ringo never spoke again. The two parrots are thought to be buried nearby.

In 2018, property developer Wykeland announced that the Earl de Grey would be moved to make room for redevelopment of Castle Street. The Earl de Grey's new location is about 100 feet (30 m) west of where it stood originally. The front of the building was disassembled and placed into storage in 2020. Reconstruction work at a new site on Waterhouse Lane began in January 2024 and is due to be completed in 2025, forming part of a restored Castle Street Chambers.
