= Martha Grey, Countess of Stamford =

British noblewoman

The Right Honourable The Countess of Stamford

Personal details
- Born: Martha Solomons c. 1838 Cape Town, Cape Colony, British Empire
- Died: 21 August 1916 Wynberg, Union of South Africa
- Resting place: Wynberg, South Africa
- Spouse: Harry Grey, 8th Earl of Stamford (m. 1880–1890)
- Children: John Grey; Frances Grey; Lady Mary Grey

Martha Grey, Countess of Stamford (née Martha Solomons; c. 1838 – 21 August 1916) was a South African-British aristocrat and school patron. She was born as the daughter of a freed slave and was referred to as “a lady of native Hottentot extraction” by the Victorian columnists. She had a relationship with the Anglican clergyman Harry Grey and gave birth to two children prior to their marriage in 1880. In 1883, her husband succeeded his third cousin as the Earl of Stamford and Baron Grey of Groby, elevating her to the British nobility. Lady Stamford funded the Battswood Training College in Wynberg, Cape Town.

== Biography ==
Lady Stamford was born Martha Solomons in Cape Town. She was the daughter of a freed slave named Rebecca and a man from Wellington named Solomon. Her mother was a well-known figure at the Cape, talked about as "eccentric", sometimes referred to as "Queen Rebecca", since she claimed to be related to the British royal family; less is known about her father.

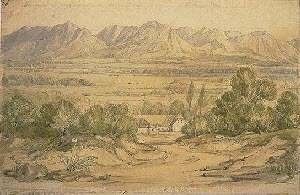
Pencil sketch of view from Wynberg by William Westall, 1801

In 1864, she met the Reverend Harry Grey, an Anglican clergyman from Cheshire in England and a third cousin of the 7th Earl of Stamford. Grey was sent to the Cape as a remittance man, paid to stay abroad, due to habits his family thought dishonourable. In 1880, Harry and Martha were married; they lived in Wynberg, Cape Town. Lady Stamford had three children: John, Frances and Mary Grey. The first two were born before their marriage, while Mary was born thereafter. Upon the death of the 7th Earl in 1883, the Earldom of Stamford and the Grey barony of Groby passed to Harry Grey, and she became Countess of Stamford and Lady Grey of Groby.

Her husband died in 1890, leaving Lady Stamford well off financially.

Lady Stamford, died in 1916, and was buried alongside her husband and her daughter Frances in Wynberg.
