= Thomas Grey, 2nd Earl of Stamford =

English politician

The Right Honourable The Earl of Stamford PC
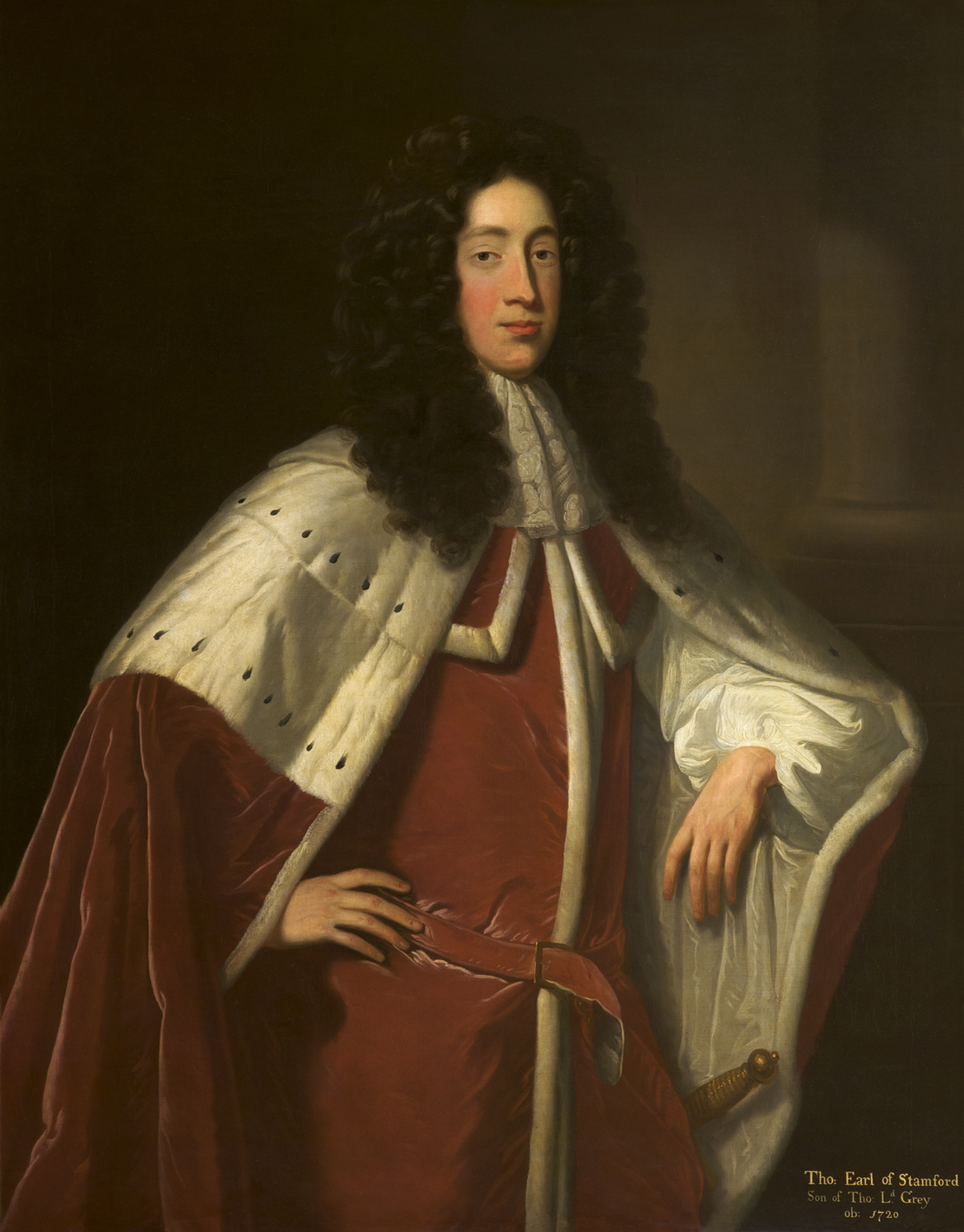
- Portrait by Jonathan Richardson

President of the Board of Trade
- In office 9 June 1699 – 19 June 1702
- Monarchs: William III; Anne
- Preceded by: The Earl of Bridgewater
- Succeeded by: The Viscount Weymouth
- In office 1705 – 12 June 1711
- Monarch: Anne
- Preceded by: The Viscount Weymouth
- Succeeded by: The Earl of Winchilsea

Personal details
- Born: 1654
- Died: 31 January 1720 (aged 65–66)

Thomas Grey, 2nd Earl of Stamford, PC (c. 1654 – 31 January 1720) was an English politician.

== Early life ==
Grey was the only son of Thomas, Lord Grey of Groby, and inherited his title from his grandfather. His mother was Lady Dorothy Bourchier, daughter of Edward Bourchier, 4th Earl of Bath.

== Career ==
Grey took some part in resisting the arbitrary actions of James II, and was arrested in July 1685. After his release he took up arms on behalf of William of Orange in the Glorious Revolution, after whose accession to the throne he was made a Privy Counsellor (1694) and Lord Lieutenant of Devon (1696). Politically he was described as an "unrepentant Whig", who reaffirmed his belief in the Popish Plot by voting against the motion to reverse the attainder on William Howard, 1st Viscount Stafford.

In 1697 he became Chancellor of the Duchy of Lancaster, and in 1699 President of the Board of Trade, being dismissed from his office upon the accession of Anne in 1702. From 1707 to 1711, however, he was again President of the Board of Trade.

== Personal life ==
He married twice. His first marriage was in 1651 to Elizabeth Harvey, a daughter of Sir Daniel Harvey, Ambassador to the Ottoman Empire. They divorced.

Lord Stamford married secondly, in 1691, to Mary Maynard, a daughter of Joseph Maynard, MP in the Cavalier Parliament.

On his death on 31 January 1720 without surviving children, his titles and Leicestershire estate at Bradgate Park passed to his first cousin Henry Grey, 3rd Earl of Stamford (1685–1739), a grandson of the first earl, from whom the later earls were descended.

== Arms ==
Arms of Grey

The arms of the head of the Grey family are blazoned Barry of six argent and azure in chief three torteaux gules.

== Notes ==
Honorary titles
| Preceded by The Earl of Huntingdon | Custos Rotulorum of Leicestershire; 1689–1702 | Succeeded by The Earl of Rutland |
| Preceded by The Earl of Bath | Lord Lieutenant of Devon; 1696–1702 | Succeeded by The Earl Poulett |
| Preceded by The Earl of Bath | Custos Rotulorum of Devon; 1696–1711 | Succeeded by The Earl Poulett |
Political offices
| Preceded by The Lord Willoughby de Eresby | Chancellor of the Duchy of Lancaster; 1697–1702 | Succeeded by Sir John Leveson-Gower |
| Preceded by The Earl of Bridgewater | President of the Board of Trade; 1699–1702 | Succeeded by The Viscount Weymouth |
| Preceded by The Viscount Weymouth | President of the Board of Trade; 1707–1711 | Succeeded by The Earl of Winchilsea |
Peerage of England
| Preceded by Henry Grey | Earl of Stamford; 1673–1720 | Succeeded by Henry Grey |
