= Harry Grey, 4th Earl of Stamford =

English peer

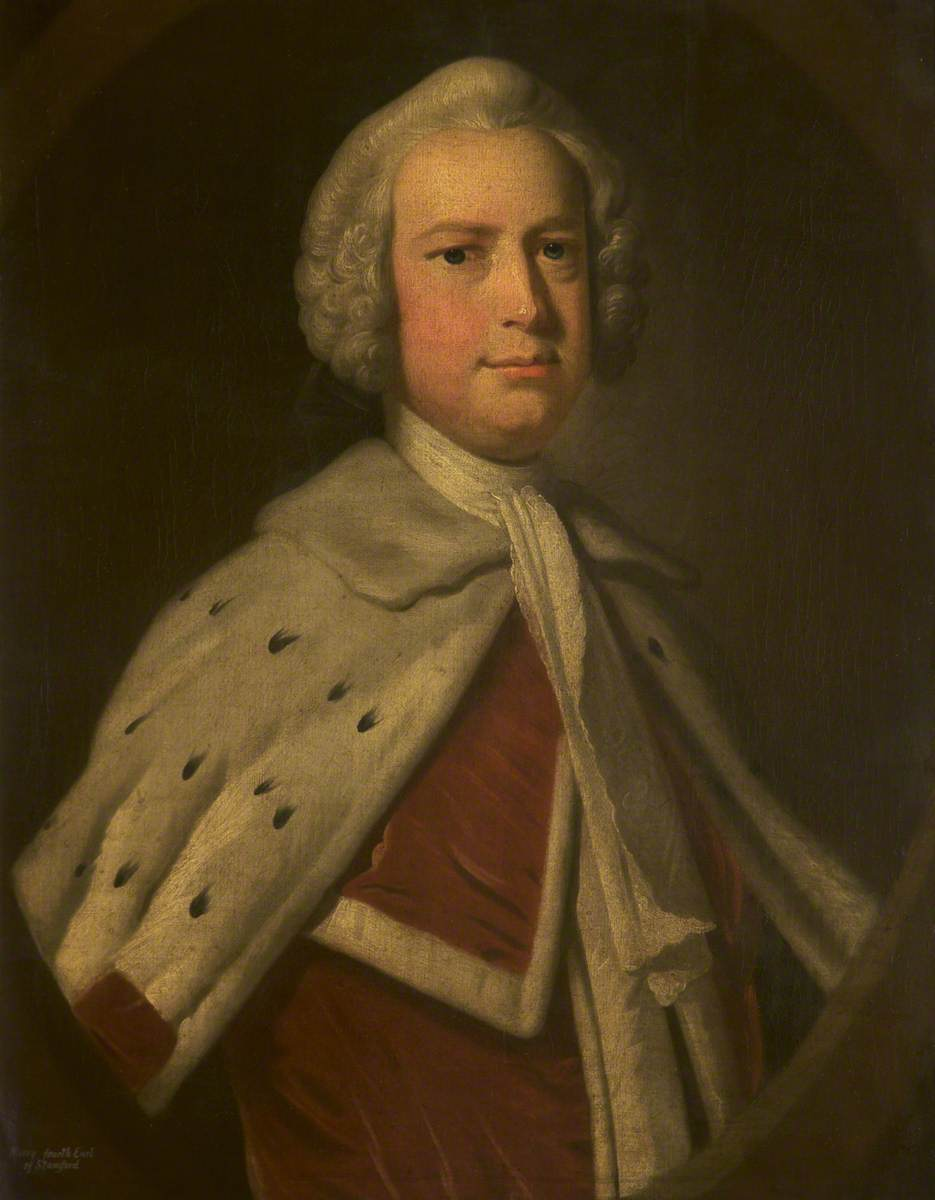
Portrait by Thomas Hudson

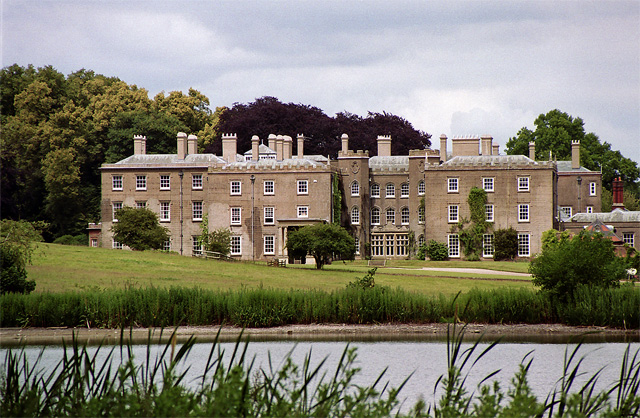
Enville Hall, Staffordshire

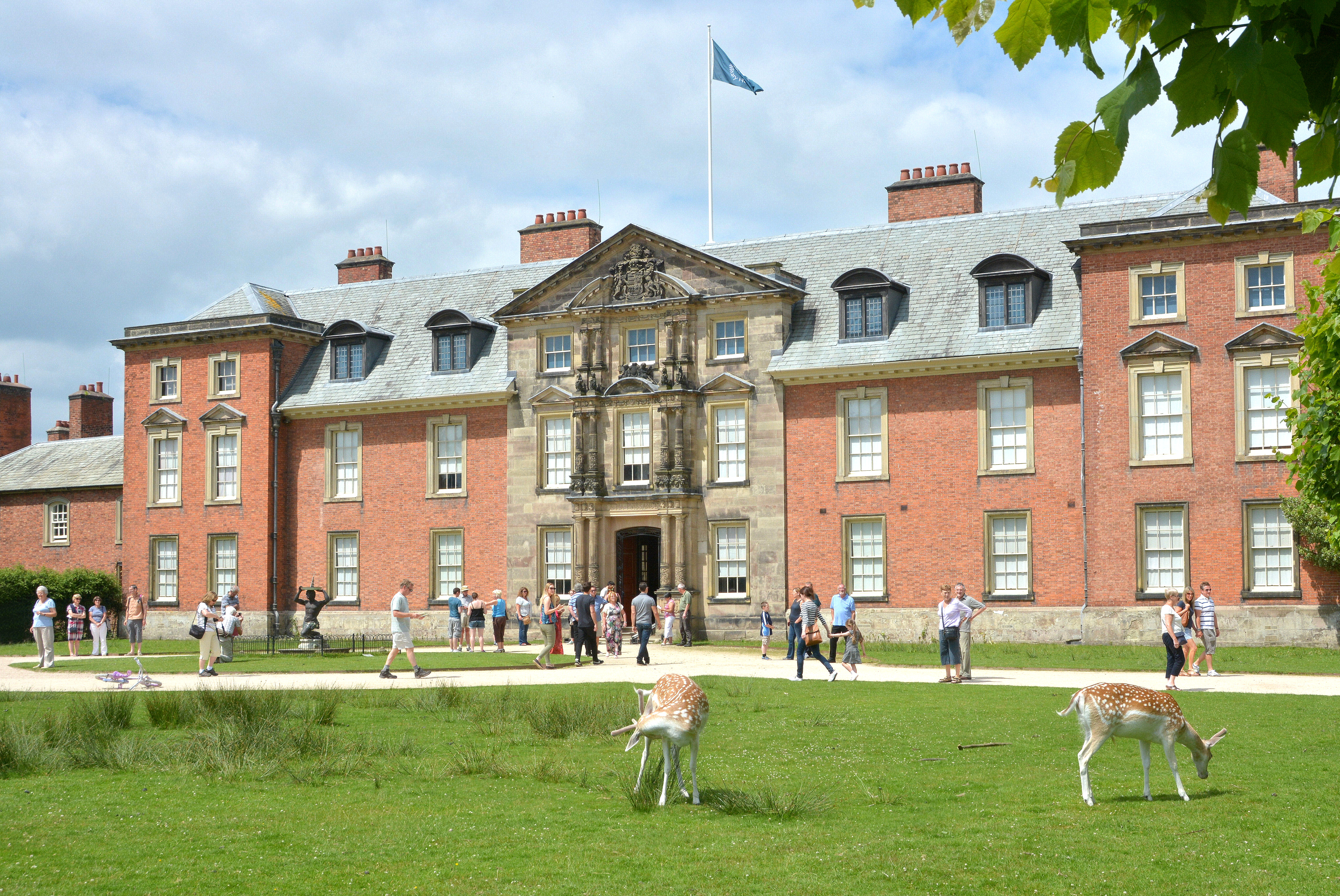
Dunham Massey Hall, Cheshire

Harry Grey, 4th Earl of Stamford (18 June 1715 – 30 May 1768) was an English peer, styled Lord Grey from 1720 to 1739.

== Biography ==
Harry Grey was born at Enville Hall, the eldest son of Henry Grey, 3rd Earl of Stamford. He was educated at Rugby and Westminster.

In 1736, he married Lady Mary Booth, the only daughter and heiress of George Booth, 2nd Earl of Warrington. They had three children:

- George Harry Grey, 5th Earl of Stamford (1737–1819)
- Hon. Booth Grey (1740–1802), the MP for Leicester from 1774 to 1784, married, with a son and daughter
- Hon. John Grey (1743 – 12 July 1802), married and had issue

In 1738, he represented Leicestershire in the British House of Commons, but entered the House of Lords in 1739 upon inheriting the earldom. On 3 March 1744, he was appointed a Deputy Lieutenant of Lincolnshire, and on 8 March, of Staffordshire too.

He had inherited the Grey estates at Bradgate Park in Leicestershire and Enville in Staffordshire but decided to make Enville Hall the family seat. Bradgate House was therefore bricked up and the park there kept for hunting and game. The Enville grounds (750 acres) were significantly re-landscaped during the mid-18th century. Mary, Countess of Stamford also inherited large estates at Dunham Massey in Cheshire and Stalybridge in Lancashire on the death of her father in 1758.

He died at Enville Hall and was succeeded in the earldom by his son (George) Harry, 5th Earl of Stamford (later Earl of Stamford and Warrington).

== See also ==
- Booth baronets

Parliament of Great Britain
Preceded by Ambrose Phillipps; Edward Smith	Member of Parliament for Leicestershire; 1738–1739; With: Edward Smith	Succeeded by Lord Guernsey; Edward Smith
Peerage of England
Preceded by Henry Grey	Earl of Stamford; 1739–1768	Succeeded by George Harry Booth-Grey
