= Henry Grey, 1st Baron Grey of Groby =

English member of parliament (1547–1614)

Knight of the Shire for Essex
- In office 1589

Personal details
- Born: 1547
- Died: 26 July 1614 (aged 66–67) Groby, England
- Spouse: Anne Windsor
- Children: 8
- Parent: John Grey (father)
- Relatives: Thomas Grey (grandfather); Anthony Browne (grandfather); Henry Grey (grandson)
- Education: Christ Church, Oxford

Henry Grey, 1st Lord Grey of Groby (1547 – 26 July 1614) was an English landowner, soldier, courtier, magistrate, county administrator, and member of parliament.

Among many other roles, he was a member of the Honourable Corps of Gentlemen at Arms and Master of the Buckhounds.

== Early life ==
Grey was the only surviving son of John Grey, son of Thomas Grey, 2nd Marquess of Dorset, and Mary Browne, daughter of Anthony Browne and his first wife, Alice Gage. It is believed he was educated at Christ Church, Oxford, where a Henry Grey graduated first with a Bachelor of Arts on 1 February 1565, followed by a Master of Arts on 18 June 1568. He was knighted on 11 November 1587.

== Career ==
Grey's main ambition was to re-establish his family's position in Leicestershire lost by his father's attainder. Henry succeeded to his father's estate at Pirgo near Havering, Essex at age 17. Five years later, he was appointed one of the Queen's Gentlemen Pensioners and was lieutenant of the band – head personal bodyguard – from 1589 to 1603. He attended Queen Elizabeth I six months of each year. Otherwise based 20 miles away at Pirgo in Essex he filled many local and county duties, was appointed deputy lieutenant of the county from 1586 to 1590 and was elected knight of the shire (MP) for the county of Essex in 1589. He was made Master of the Buckhounds in 1596.

Grey had been put on the commission of the peace for Essex about 1569 and in 1600 was described as the county's senior justice. His efforts for Queen and county were recognised and the completion of his court duties noted when another cousin, James I, four days before his coronation, raised him to the peerage on 21 July 1603 as Baron Grey of Groby, Leicestershire.

By this time, 1603, Grey had managed to reacquire most of his family's estates. Those in Leicestershire centred on Bradgate House in its manor of Groby, a few miles from Leicester. As the new Lord Grey of Groby, aged 58, he took up residence at Bradgate and devoted most of his energies to strengthening his family's position in the County. This included reviving the feud and intense competition between the Greys and the Hastings earls of Huntingdon, which had enlivened and divided Leicestershire for much of the early sixteenth century.

== Private life ==
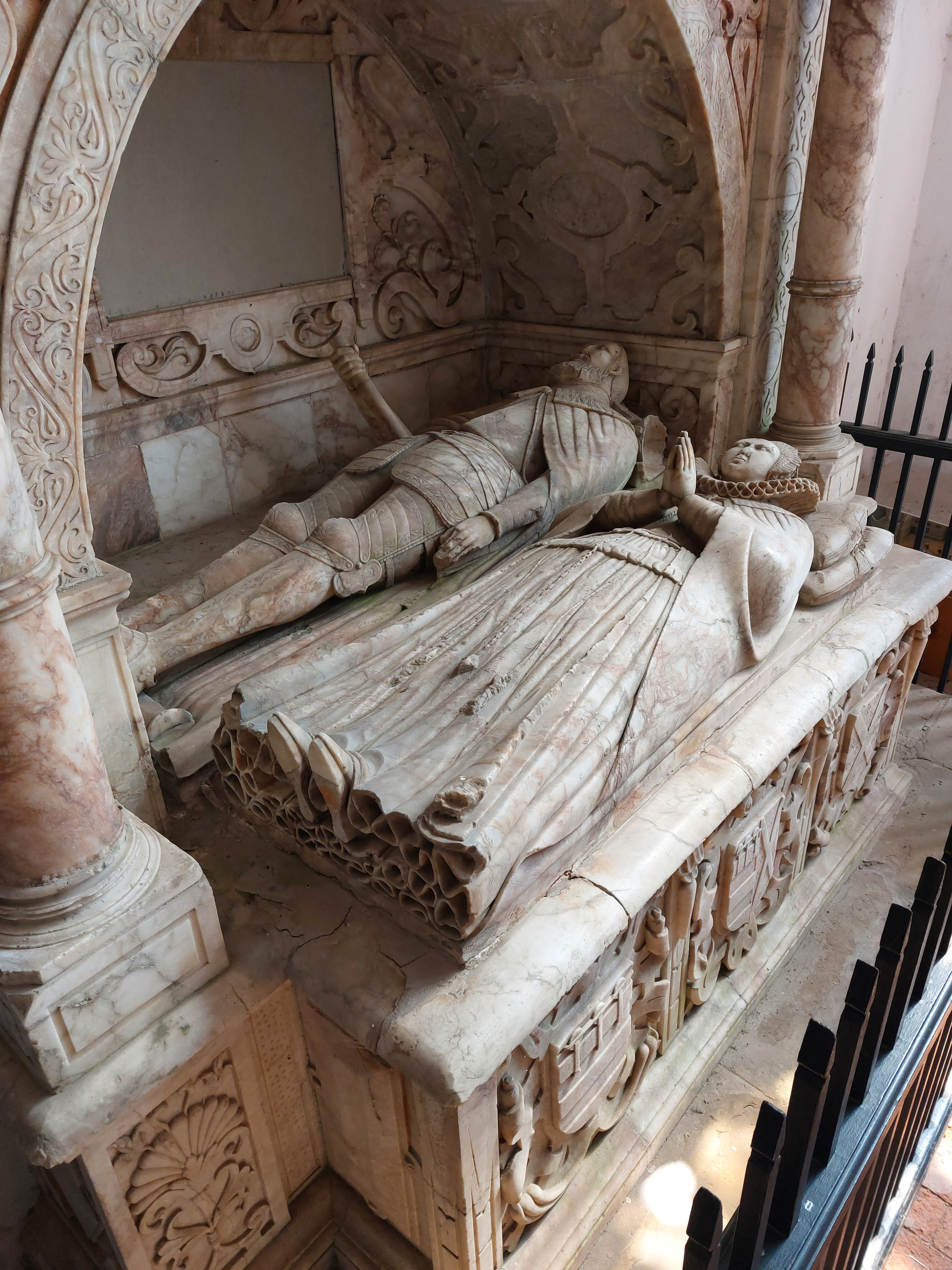
The tomb of Henry and Anne Grey in Bradgate House Chapel

Grey married Anne, daughter of William, 2nd Lord Windsor of Bradenham, Buckinghamshire.

Grey and Anne had four sons and four daughters including:

- John Grey, who married Elizabeth Nevill, he was the father of Henry Grey, died, in October 1611 in his father's lifetime.
- Henry Grey
- Ambrose Grey, father of Mary, Lady Wrottesley, wife of Walter Wrottesley
- George Grey, who left no surviving children
- Mary Grey, who married firstly, William Sulyard and secondly, Thomas Steward.
- Elizabeth Grey, wife of Anthony Felton

Grey died at Bradgate House on 26 July 1614, newly widowed, and was buried in the family chapel there. He was succeeded in the barony by his grandson Henry, who later become the first Earl of Stamford.

== Sources ==
Court offices
Preceded by vacant	Master of the Buckhounds; 1596–1603	Succeeded by Sir Thomas Tyringham
Peerage of England
New creation	Baron Grey of Groby; 1603–1614	Succeeded by Henry Grey
