= Baron Grey =

Baron Grey may refer to:

- Baron Grey, of Howick, a subsidiary title of the Earl Grey, in the Peerage of the United Kingdom
- Baron Grey of Codnor, a title in the Peerage of England
- Baron Grey, of Groby, a subsidiary title of the Earl of Stamford in the Peerage of England
- Baron Grey of Naunton, an extinct title in the Peerage of the United Kingdom
- Baron Grey de Powis, an extinct title in the Peerage of England
- Baron Grey de Radcliffe, an extinct title in the Peerage of the United Kingdom
- Baron Grey de Rolleston, an extinct title in the Peerage of England
- Baron Grey de Rotherfield, a dormant title in the Peerage of England
- Baron Grey de Ruthyn, an abeyant title in the Peerage of England
- Baron Greystock, an abeyant title in the Peerage of England
- Baron Grey of Warke, an extinct title in the Peerage of England
- Baron Grey de Wilton, an early title of the Earl of Wilton
