= Earl of Warrington =

Earldom in the Peerage of Great Britain

The Earldom of Warrington is a title which has been created twice in British history, in 1690 and 1796. For information on the 1690 creation, see Booth baronets. For information on the 1796 creation, see Earl of Stamford.

== See also ==
- Dunham Massey
- Earldom
- House of Lords
