= Bradgate House, Groby =

Ruined 19th-century house in Groby, Leicestershire

Bradgate House is a 19th-century ruin in Groby, Leicestershire, England.

Built in 1856 for the seventh Earl of Stamford, George Harry Grey, it was intended as a replacement for the 16th century Bradgate House built circa 1520, built by his ancestor Thomas Grey, 2nd Marquess of Dorset and home of Lady Jane Grey. The house was constructed in a Jacobean style on a site 2 miles south-west of Bradgate Park. The large, handsome mansion was referred to as "Calendar House", supposedly having 365 windows, 52 rooms and 12 main chimneys. The Earl of Stamford was known for his extravagance. The stable block alone, built when the Earl became master of the Quorn Hunt, cost £30,000, a massive sum for those days. The house was sold for demolition in 1925 and subsequently demolished, leaving only the quadrangular stable block (52.6789°N 1.2511°W), a grandiose building even in its current dilapidated state.

== See also ==
- Bradgate House (16th century)
