= Henry Grey, 1st Earl of Stamford =

English nobleman and military leader

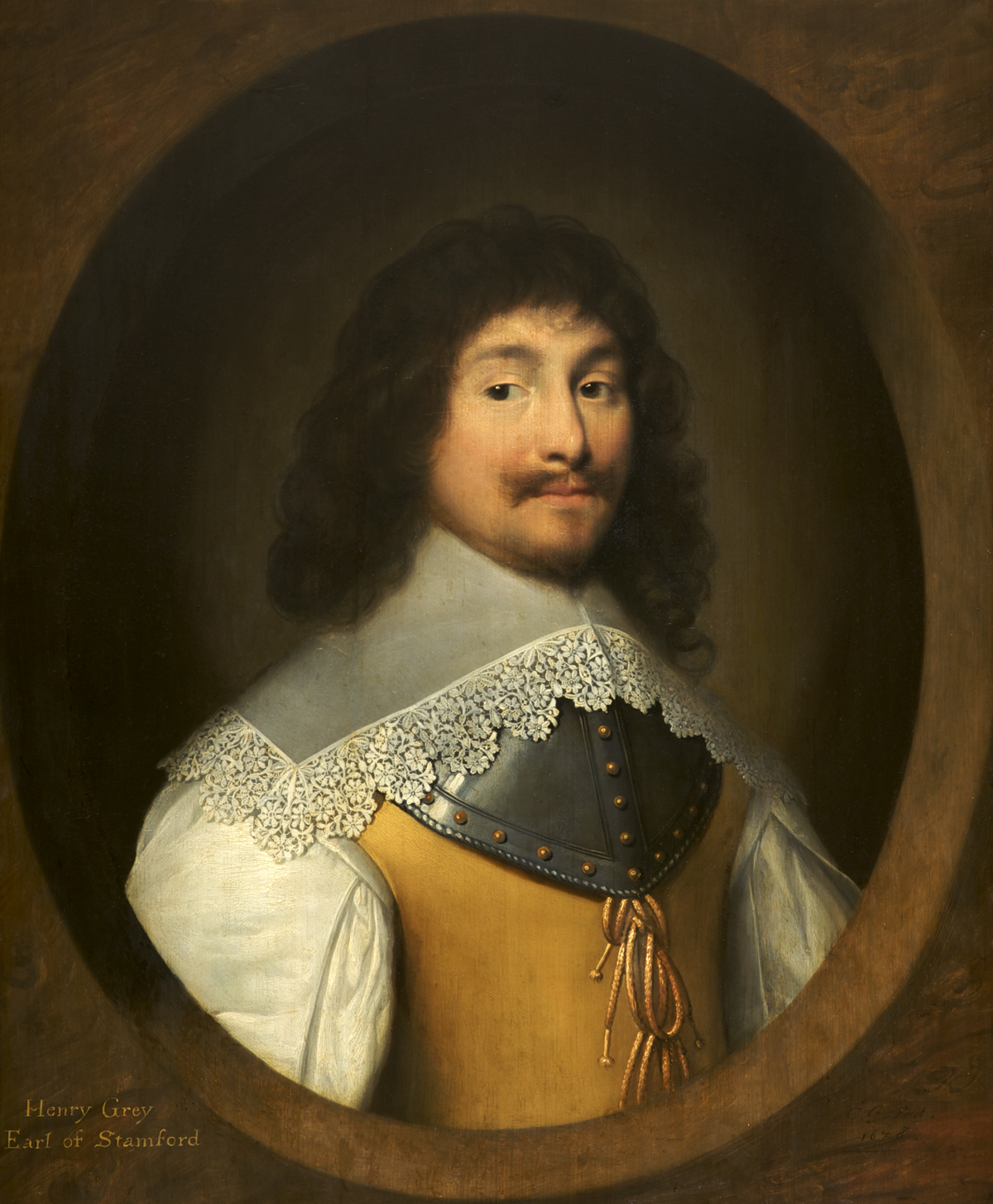
- A 1638 painting of Henry Grey by Cornelis Janssens van Ceulen
- Born: c. 1599
- Died: 21 August 1673 (aged 73–74)
- Education: Trinity College, Cambridge
- Spouse: Anne Cecil
- Children: 9+, including Thomas, Anchitell and John
- Relatives: Henry Grey (grandfather); Thomas Grey (grandson); Thomas Bruce (grandson); Henry Booth (grandson); Harry Grey (grandson)
- Military career
- Allegiance: Parliamentarians
- Wars: English Civil War

Henry Grey, 1st Earl of Stamford (c. 1599 – 21 August 1673), known as the Lord Grey of Groby from 1614 to 1628, was an English nobleman and military leader. He was the eldest son of Sir John Grey and Elizabeth Nevill. His mother was probably a daughter of Edward Nevill, 8th Baron Bergavenny (died 1622) and his wife Rachel Lennard.

Henry succeeded his paternal grandfather, Henry Grey, 1st Baron Grey of Groby, as second Baron Grey of Groby in July 1614. His paternal grandmother was Anne Windsor, youngest daughter of William Windsor, 2nd Baron Windsor and his first wife Margaret Sambourne.

His great-grandfather Lord John Grey of Pirgo was son of Thomas Grey, 2nd Marquess of Dorset and younger brother of Henry Grey, 1st Duke of Suffolk.

== Life and career ==
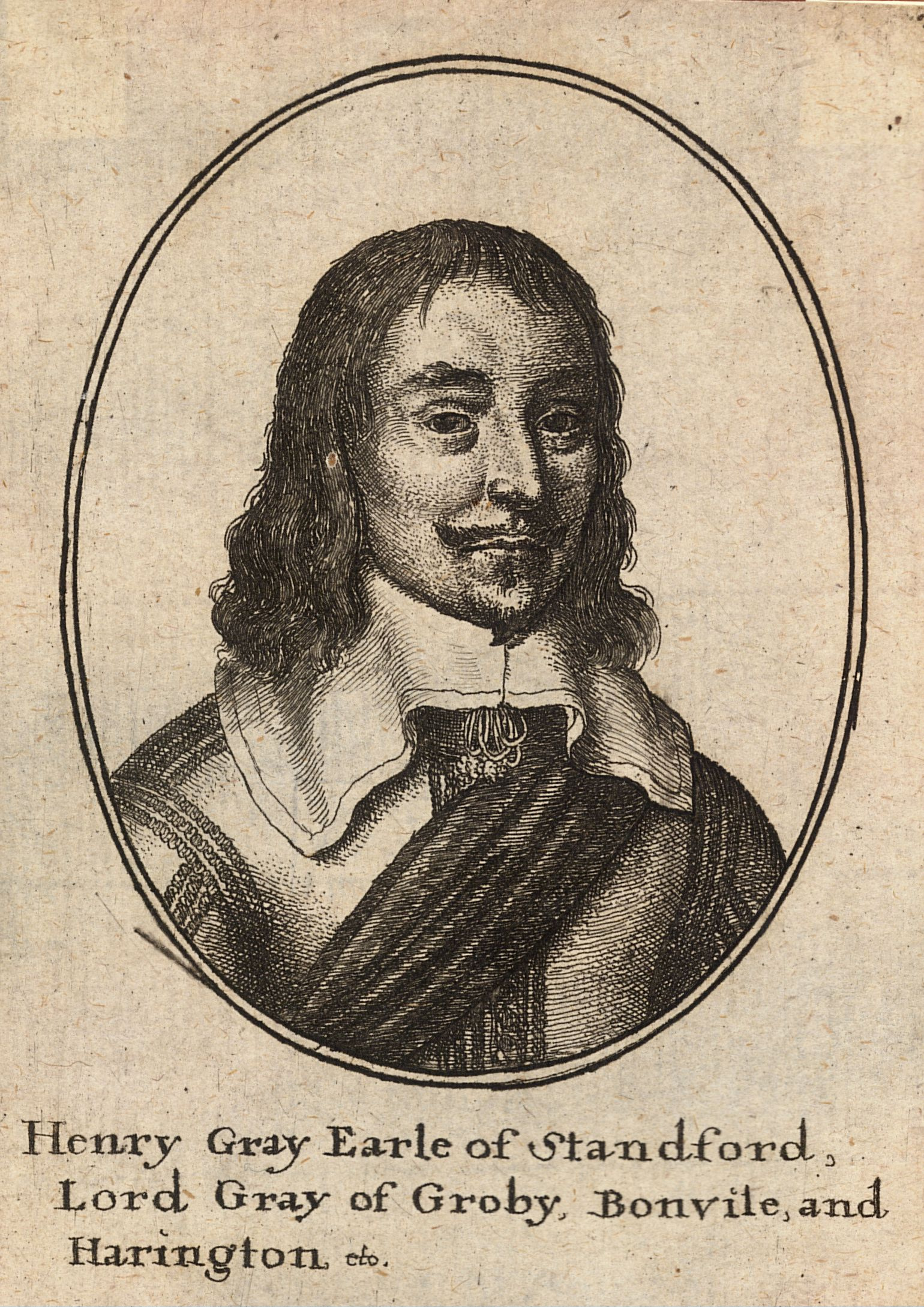
Contemporary engraving of Henry Gray by Wenceslas Hollar

Henry Grey matriculated at Trinity College, Cambridge in 1615, and was granted an M.A. that year, during the visit of King James I of England. He married Lady Anne Cecil, daughter of William Cecil, 2nd Earl of Exeter by his second wife, Elizabeth Drury. Lady Anne Cecil was the heiress of the borough and manor of Stamford. In March 1628, Henry was created Earl of Stamford. Just before the outbreak of the English Civil War, he was included as one of the opponents of King Charles I of England, and was made lord lieutenant of Leicestershire. After some operations around Leicester, he occupied Hereford, and when compelled to abandon the city, marched to Cornwall.

At the Battle of Stratton, on 16 May 1643, his troops were beaten by the Royalists; driven into Exeter, the Earl of Stamford was forced to surrender the city after a siege of three months. He was certainly no general, and was charged with cowardice. He took no further part in the military operations of the war, although once or twice he was employed on other businesses.

The ravages of the Royalists had reduced him to poverty, and distrusted by the House of Commons, he had great difficulty in getting any compensation from Parliament. After a period of retirement, he declared for King Charles II of England during a rising in August 1659, and was arrested but soon released. Henry Grey died on 21 August 1673; his earldom passed to his grandson, Thomas Grey, 2nd Earl of Stamford.

== Children ==
Henry had at least nine children with Lady Anne Cecil, they were:

- Lady Elizabeth Grey (born c. 1622). She married George Booth, 1st Baron Delamer and was the mother of Henry Booth, 1st Earl of Warrington.
- Thomas Grey, Lord Grey of Groby (c. 1623 – 1657), Member of Parliament for Leicester.
- Lady Diana Grey (before 1631 – 8 April 1689). She married Robert Bruce, 2nd Earl of Elgin and was the mother of Thomas Bruce, 3rd Earl of Elgin.
- Anchitell Grey (died 1702), the compiler of the Debates of the House of Commons, 1667-1694 (10 vols, 1769).
- John Grey. He married Lady Catherine Ward, daughter of Edward Ward, 7th Baron Dudley and Frances Brereton. They were parents of Harry Grey, 3rd Earl of Stamford.
- Lady Jane Grey. Married into the Ogle family.
- Leonard Grey. Believed to have died young, but in fact, as he moved to France, his whereabouts were lost. There he married Anne Durand. Leonard died c. 1693, very likely in Paris. The German general Heinrich Wilhelm von Stamford might descend from him.
- Lady Anna Grey
- Lady Mary Grey. Believed to have died young.

== Arms ==
Arms of Grey

The arms of the head of the Grey family are blazoned Barry of six argent and azure in chief three torteaux gules.

== Ancestry ==
Ancestors of Henry Grey, 1st Earl of Stamford

8. Lord John Grey of Pirgo
4. Henry Grey, 1st Baron Grey of Groby
9. Mary Browne
2. Sir John Grey
10. William Windsor, 2nd Baron Windsor
5. Anne Windsor
11. Margaret Sambourne
1. Henry Grey, 1st Earl of Stamford
12. Edward Nevill, 7th Baron Bergavenny
6. ?Edward Nevill, 8th Baron Bergavenny
13. Katherine Brome
3. Elizabeth Nevill
14. John Lennard
7. ?Rachel Lennard
15. Elizabeth Harman

Peerage of England
New creation	Earl of Stamford; 1628–1673	Succeeded by Thomas Grey
Preceded by Henry Grey	Baron Grey of Groby; 1614–1673	Succeeded by Thomas Grey
