= Enville, Staffordshire =

Village in Staffordshire, England

Coordinates: 52.477943°N 2.259088°W

Enville
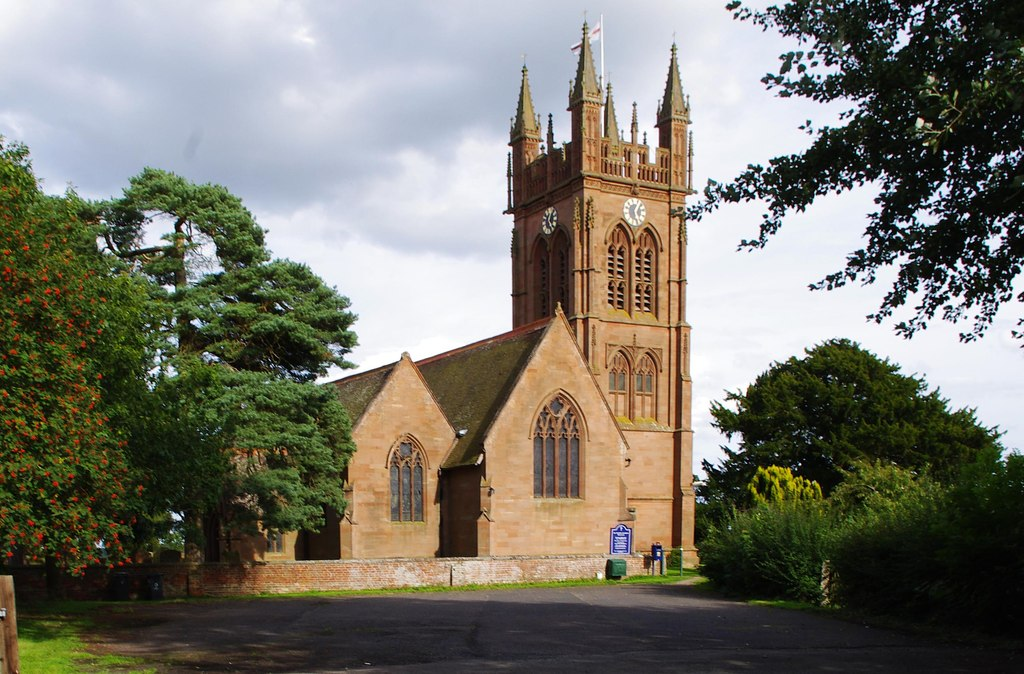
- Church of St Mary the Virgin, Enville

- Location within Staffordshire
- Population: 487 (2011)
- OS grid reference: SO825867
- Civil parish: Enville
- District: South Staffordshire
- Shire county: Staffordshire
- Region: West Midlands
- Country: England
- Sovereign state: United Kingdom
- Post town: STOURBRIDGE
- Postcode district: DY7
- Dialling code: 01384
- Police: Staffordshire
- Fire: Staffordshire
- Ambulance: West Midlands
- UK Parliament: South Staffordshire

Enville is a village and civil parish in rural Staffordshire, England, on the A458 road between Stourbridge and Bridgnorth.

Enville is in the South Staffordshire district. The largest village nearby is Kinver, with the smaller villages of Bobbington and Six Ashes, "The Sheepwalks" — a popular walking area nearby, as is Kinver Edge. Enville Golf Course is just outside the village. The hamlet of Six Ashes marks the old border of two counties — Staffordshire and Shropshire, and was the centre of the division of land as drawn up by the 1405 Tripartite Indenture between Owain Glyndŵr, Edmund Mortimer, and Henry Percy, 1st Earl of Northumberland.

Enville is the nearest village to Highgate Common.

== Etymology ==
The earliest recorded name of the village was Efnefeld, and under that name it is entered in Domesday Book, the first part comes from the Welsh 'cefn' a Welsh word meaning "ridge" or "hillside". The nearby Kinver derives from the same word.

== Amenities ==
The village includes The Cat Inn public house, a post office, a beauty salon, and a tea rooms with gift shop.

== Church ==
St Mary's Church stands to the west of the village. The present ornate tower was built in 1871, when the original tower was taken down. Evidence of an earlier church on the site is to be found in a small stone figure of Anglo-Saxon origin built into the arcading above the south aisle. The church has a Norman nave (about AD 1100) and a transitional chancel (built by Roger de Birmingham, AD 1272–1307) and despite extensive restorations in 1749 and 1871 the distinguishing features remain. The church also contains four, 15th-century misericords, which are placed on either side of the choir stalls.

Television presenter Nick Owen and his second wife married here in 2020.

== Enville Hall ==
The Enville Hall estate is prominent in the village. The Earls of Stamford lived in Enville Hall which is still owned and lived in by the family though the title is extinct. The hall, which once boasted its own private racecourse (now a mere forestry track), remains a private house, but it hosts occasional events each year.

The Great Fountain, Enville, was a fountain created in the mid-19th century by the Earl of Stamford in the middle of a lake in Enville Hall.

== Sport ==
The grounds of Enville Hall are home to a recreational field, where Enville Cricket Club and Enville Athletic F.C. play.

Enville Cricket Club was formed in honour of the Coronation of George IV in 1821. An article in The Illustrated London News reporting on a match played by the club on Lord's Cricket Ground in 1857 praised Enville's, recently created by the 7th Earl rather than Lord's as "the finest cricket ground in the world". Currently (2021) it plays three senior teams in the Worcestershire County Cricket League and a junior team.

== See also ==
- Listed buildings in Enville, Staffordshire
