= Enville Hall =

Country house in Enville, Staffordshire, England

Enville Hall, Staffordshire
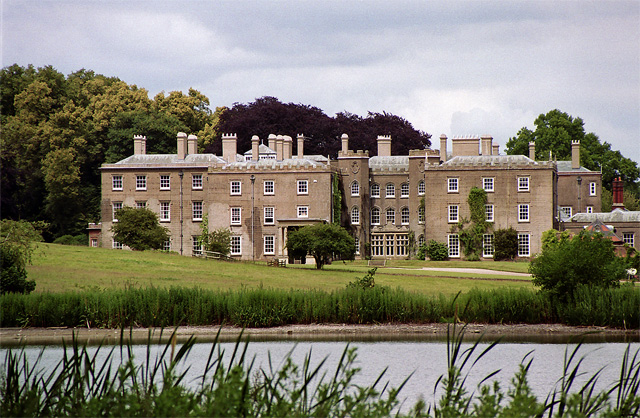
- Interactive map of the Enville Hall, Staffordshire area

General information
- Type: Country House
- Architectural style: Tudor/Gothic
- Location: Enville, Staffordshire, England
- Coordinates: 52.47340°N 2.25959°W

Design and construction
- Designations: Grade II listed

Enville Hall is an English Tudor country house in the village of Enville, Staffordshire. It is a Grade II listed building.

The house has a 16th and 17th-century U-shaped core formed by the hall range and two flanking wings enclosing a south facing main courtyard. An 18th-century extension to the east encloses a second courtyard. A further extension c.1770 created a north-west wing, when at the same time the south front was remodelled in the Gothic style. It is constructed in 3 storeys of rough cast bricks with a hipped slate roof and stands in an estate of some 6,500 acres of park and farmland.

== History ==
The Enville estate was acquired in the 15th century by the Grey family of Bradgate Park in Leicestershire. Henry Grey, 2nd Baron Grey of Groby was made Earl of Stamford in 1628 and the 3rd Earl would then vacate Bradgate in favour of Enville. It passed down through the Earls of Stamford, the 5th Earl creating the Gothic frontage and the 7th Earl building a large, ornate conservatory (since demolished).

After the 7th Earl's childless death in 1883, the Grey estates were split, some, including Dunham Massey, going with the earldom to the 8th Earl (a distant cousin living in Africa). Enville, however, was to pass to Katherine Payne, the great-niece of the earl’s second wife after the countess's own death. Katherine was the wife of Sir Henry Foley Lambert, who thereupon took the name of Grey. Unfortunately the hall burned down two months before the dowager countess's death in 1905.

Nevertheless the hall was rebuilt for Sir Henry Grey to the design of architect Richard Creed, and passed to Katherine's son John Foley Grey and in turn to his daughter Eileen, who had married the Earl of Harrington. She lived at the Hall for fifty years before passing it on in 1999 to the Williams family, descendants of her second marriage.

== See also ==
- Listed buildings in Enville, Staffordshire
