= Arthur Hutchinson =

Arthur Hutchinson may refer to:

- Arthur Hutchinson (mineralogist) (1866–1937), British mineralogist
- Sir Arthur Hutchinson (civil servant) (1896–1981), British soldier and civil servant
- Arthur Hutchinson (murderer) (born 1941), British convicted triple murderer
- Arthur Hutchinson (footballer) (1903–1951), Australian rules footballer
- Arthur Hutchinson (dentist) (1889–1969), British professor of dentistry
- A. S. M. Hutchinson (Arthur Stuart-Menteth Hutchinson, 1879–1971), British novelist
- Arthur Hutchinson (c. 1870-1927), editor, the Windsor Magazine
