= Rayner Stephens =

English Methodist minister (1805–1879)

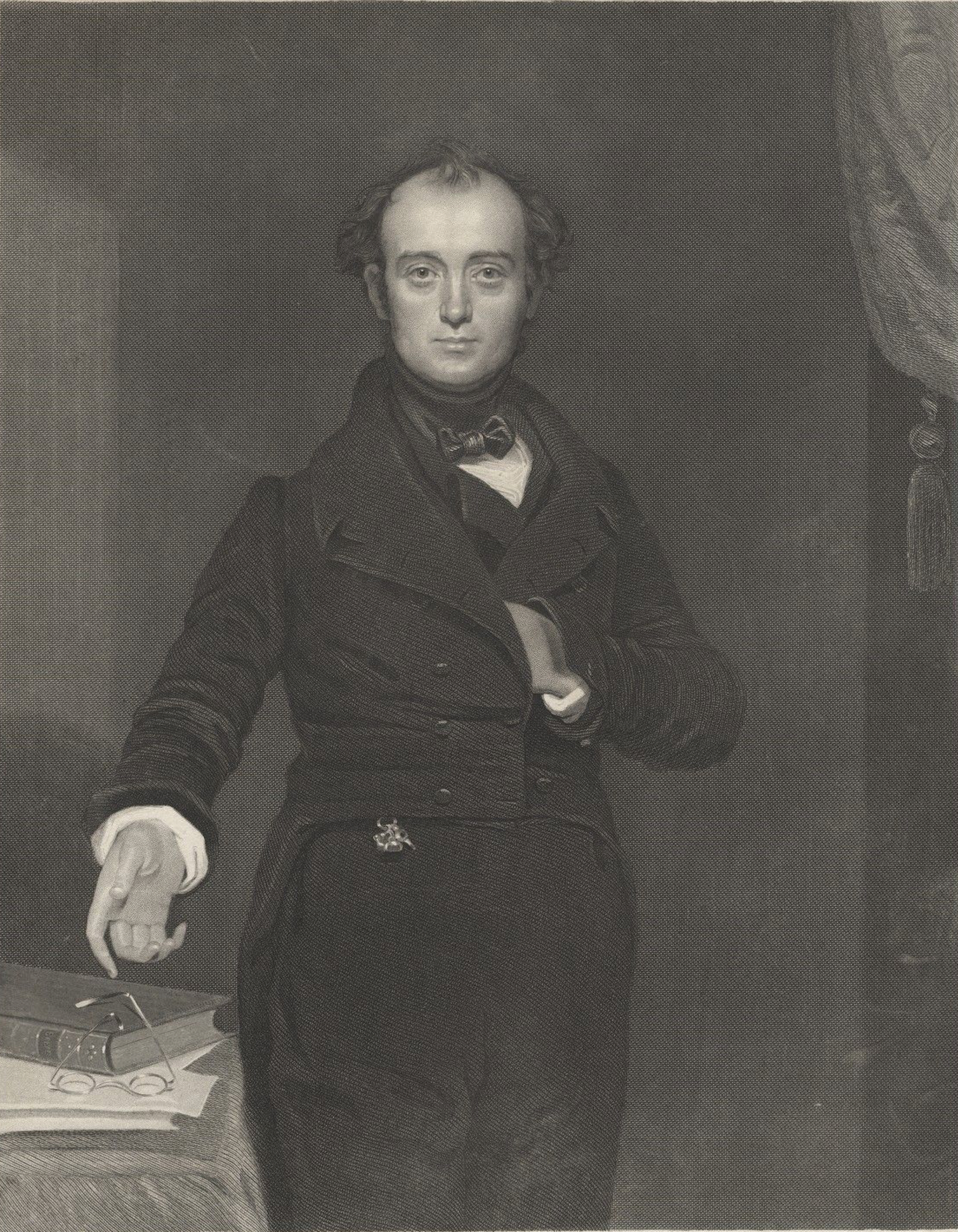
Portrait of Joseph Rayner Stephens, engraved by James Posselwhite after a painting by Benjamin Garside. Commissioned by Feargus O'Connor, this engraving was distributed with 25.000 copies of the chartist newspaper the Northern Star in November 1839. When Stephens less than a month later denounced the movement in reaction to the Newport Rising, chartists responded by publicly burning his portrait

Joseph Rayner Stephens (8 March 1805 – 18 February 1879) was a Methodist minister who offended the Wesleyan Conference by his support for separating the Church of England from the State. Resigning from the Wesleyan Connection, he became free to campaign for factory reform, and against the New Poor Law. He became associated with 'physical force' Chartism (although he later denied he had ever been a Chartist) and spent eighteen months in jail for his presence at an unlawful assembly and his use there of seditious language. Born in Edinburgh in 1805, he moved to Manchester when his minister father was posted there in 1819. During his religious career, he worked in a variety of places (including Stockholm and Newcastle-upon-Tyne) before arriving in Ashton-under-Lyne in 1832. He was the brother of the philologist George Stephens. Three of his other brothers (John, Edward and Samuel) emigrated to Southern Australia and played their parts in the early years of that colony.

== Leaves Wesleyan Methodism ==
Stephens gave a number of talks in favour of disestablishment and became secretary of the Ashton branch of a society arguing for disestablishment. His district conference attempted to discipline him for engaging in controversial political activity, and for taking a view on Church Establishment contrary to that of Wesleyans and of John Wesley. Stephens was willing to accept a temporary suspension on most points, but not on deviation from the views of Wesley, in whose writings he found views matching his own. The national conference nonetheless asserted that true Wesleyans were in favour of the existence of an Established Church and lengthened his suspension: Stephens resigned and set up his own "Stephenite" churches in Ashton-under-Lyne and Stalybridge.

== Political agitation ==
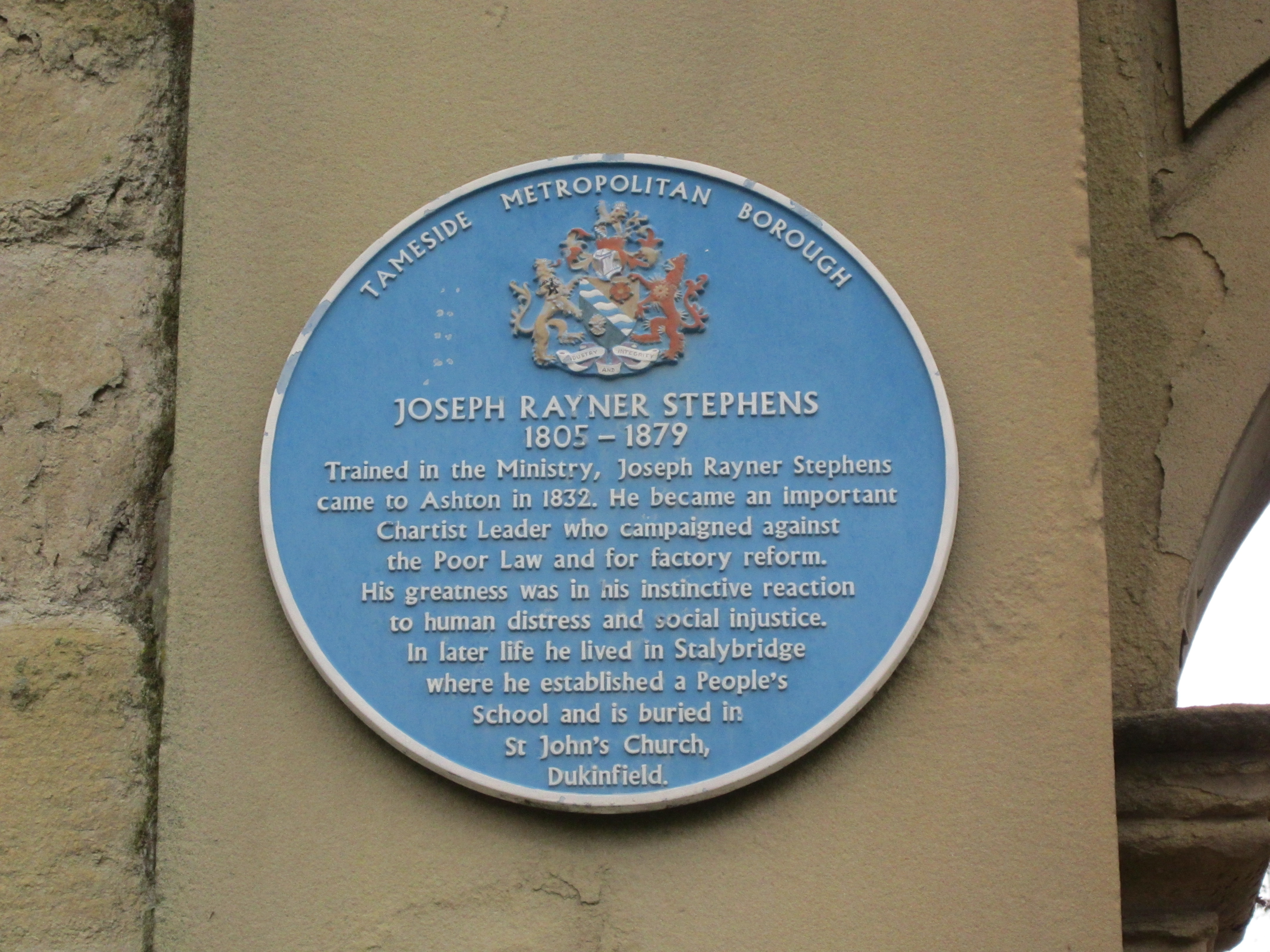
Joseph Rayner Stephens blue plaque, Stalybridge Town Hall (Note: In lapidary inscriptions, a man is not on oath Stephens denied being a Chartist: and not only was he "trained in the ministry", he was a minister of religion for forty years)

He became active in the movement for factory reform and in the anti-Poor Law movement. In both sermons and speeches he denounced the practices of millowners and the intentions of the new Poor Law as un-Christian and hence doomed to end in social upheaval and bloodshed. Like Richard Oastler he held Tory views on most issues; (Note: he, Oastler, Michael Thomas Sadler, and Feargus O'Connor were denounced by contemporary Whigs as Tory agitators cynically whipping up discontent on carefully misrepresented issues in order to turn the lower orders against the Whigs: the description "Tory Radicals" would have been rejected by them but is now frequently used as a convenient label) like Oastler he advised his followers that it was legal to arm themselves and that government would pay more attention to their views if they did. He and Oastler (who saw the younger man as his natural successor) became associated with the Chartists, who also saw the new Poor Law, the rapacity and inhumanity of employers and the poverty of workers as issues requiring urgent attention, but sought to remedy them by fundamental political change. Whereas Oastler openly opposed the constitutional aspirations of the Chartists, and did not become involved in Chartism, Stephens addressed Chartist meetings and was elected a delegate to the National Conference. However, as he later told his congregation, he was never a Radical, let alone a 'five-point man' : "I would rather walk to London on my bare knees, on sharp flint stones to attend an Anti-poor Law meeting, than be carried to London in a coach and six, pillowed with down to present that petition - the "national petition" to the House of Commons" Nor did his advice to followers to arm themselves indicate any support for 'physical force' Chartism or the overthrow of the existing order by violence or by general strike: "My friends, never put your trust in, and never follow after, men who pretend to be able to manufacture a revolution. A revolution, a rolling away of the whole from evil to good, from wrong to right, from injustice and oppression to righteousness and equal rule, never yet was manufactured, and never will be manufactured. God, who teaches you what your rights are, what the blessings He has endowed you withal, will, in his own good time, if that time should come - God will teach your hands to war, and your fingers to fight"

== Imprisonment ==
In December 1838, Stephens was arrested, charged with having participated in a tumultuous assembly at Leigh on 13 November 1838 and having incited the meeting to violence against inhabitants of the neighbourhood. A Lancashire grand jury returned a true bill both for the Leigh meeting and for sermons preached in Ashton-under-Lyne: however Stephens was eventually tried at Chester in connection with a meeting at Hyde (then in Cheshire) on 14 November 1838. Stephens was charged with attending "an unlawful meeting, seditiously and tumultuously met together by torch-light, and with fire-arms disturbing the public peace" and two counts of speaking at the meeting. Witnesses said attendance at the meeting had been about 5,000 mostly from outside Hyde, (Note: the total population of Hyde in 1851 was not much over 11,000) firearms had been discharged, banners with slogans such as "Tyrants, believe, and tremble" and "BLOOD" had been displayed and the meeting had not broken up until midnight. It had been successfully argued (to secure the conviction of Orator Hunt in the aftermath of the Peterloo massacre) that to be unlawful a meeting need only be one such that taking all the circumstances into consideration cannot but endanger the public peace, and raise fears and jealousies among the king's subjects. Stephens was convicted and sentenced to eighteen months' imprisonment. He served his sentence in Chester Castle, under far from onerous conditions, and was released eight days early, to allow him to attend his father's funeral.

== Later life ==
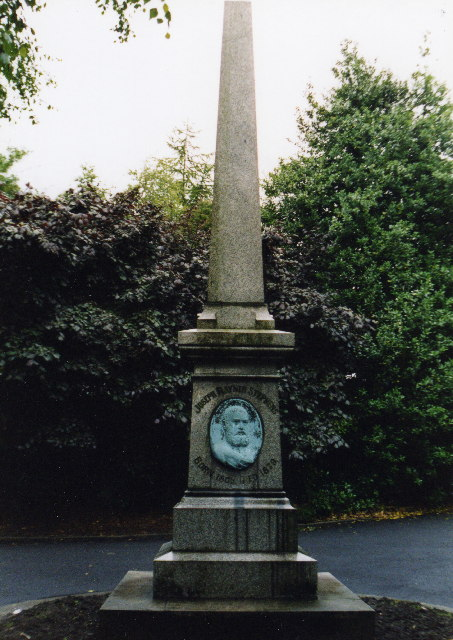
Stephens Memorial, Stamford Park, Stalybridge

Heavy sureties had to be given for his good behaviour for the next five years, and he did not resume public speaking until participating in a campaign for better enforcement of the Ten Hours' Act, the Factory Act 1833 (3 & 4 Will. 4. c. 103) (i.e. against the relay system) in 1849, explicitly holding non-compliance and non-enforcement to be responsible for social unrest and the more extreme forms that manifested itself in: "It is the practice of injustice towards the poor which estranges them from the institutions of their country, and leads them into many wild and unreasoning projects to obtain deliverance from the intolerable yoke that has been fastened upon them" He supported opposition to the 'Compromise Act', the Factories Act 1850 (13 & 14 Vict. c. 54), and took part in abortive campaigns for legislation for a true ten-hour day enforced by stoppage of machinery. In 1857, he looked back on his agitational heyday

History would do justice to the memory of the benevolent and heroic men who had first devoted themselves to this great work (factory reform). Nothing gave him so much satisfaction in the retrospect, as the humble part he had been permitted to take in this good cause. That he, with them, had been misunderstood, misrepresented, and maligned, was only what was to be expected in the nature of things. It was a hard battle, and he had fought it; hard things had to be said and he had said them. It was no kid glove work they had to do, but work that required roughish handling. He had been impelled by a stern sense of duty in all he had done, and whilst doing it had never stayed to sigh over the sorrow, or quail before the opposition he had encountered. He was too busy and too proud to turn aside to enter into explanations and defence, knowing well that if he died in harness his motives would receive posthumous vindication; that if he lived the battle out, he should live misrepresentation and prejudice down. And so it had proved

He campaigned on the inadequacy and mal-distribution of relief during the Cotton Famine; attention was drawn to this and to Stephens' past history when there were riots on the relief issue in Stalybridge. In 1868 he lectured against disestablishment of the Irish Church. Stephens is buried in St John's Church, Dukinfield and commemorated by a blue plaque placed on the remains of the former Stalybridge Town Hall and an obelisk monument in Stamford Park. Rayner Stephens High School in Dukinfield is named after him.

== Bibliography ==
Holyoake, George Jacob. (1881) Life of Joseph Rayner Stephens, preacher and political orator. London: Williams and Norgate

Issued to support the memorial appeal. Not so much a 'Life' as a collection of extensive quotations from a few letters and sermons - furthermore Holyoake (a Radical and free-thinker) is clearly not in sympathy with Stephens' political position (and perhaps does not understand it)

Edwards, M.S. (1994). Purge This Realm – A Life of Joseph Rayner Stephens. London: Epworth Press.
