= Stalybridge Town Hall =

Building in Greater Manchester, England

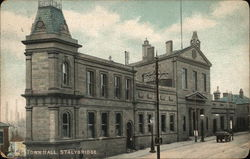
- The Stamford Street frontage

- Shown in Greater Manchester
- 53.4840°N 2.0560°W
- Location: Waterloo Road, Stalybridge

History
- Built: 1831

Site notes
- Architect: Fairbairn & Lillie
- Architectural style: Neoclassical style

Listed Building – Grade II
- Official name: Former Stalybridge Town Hall
- Designated: 9 August 1966
- Reference no.: 1067987

Stalybridge Town Hall was a municipal building in Stamford Street, Stalybridge, Greater Manchester, England. The building, which was the meeting place of Stalybridge Borough Council, was a Grade II listed building.

== History ==
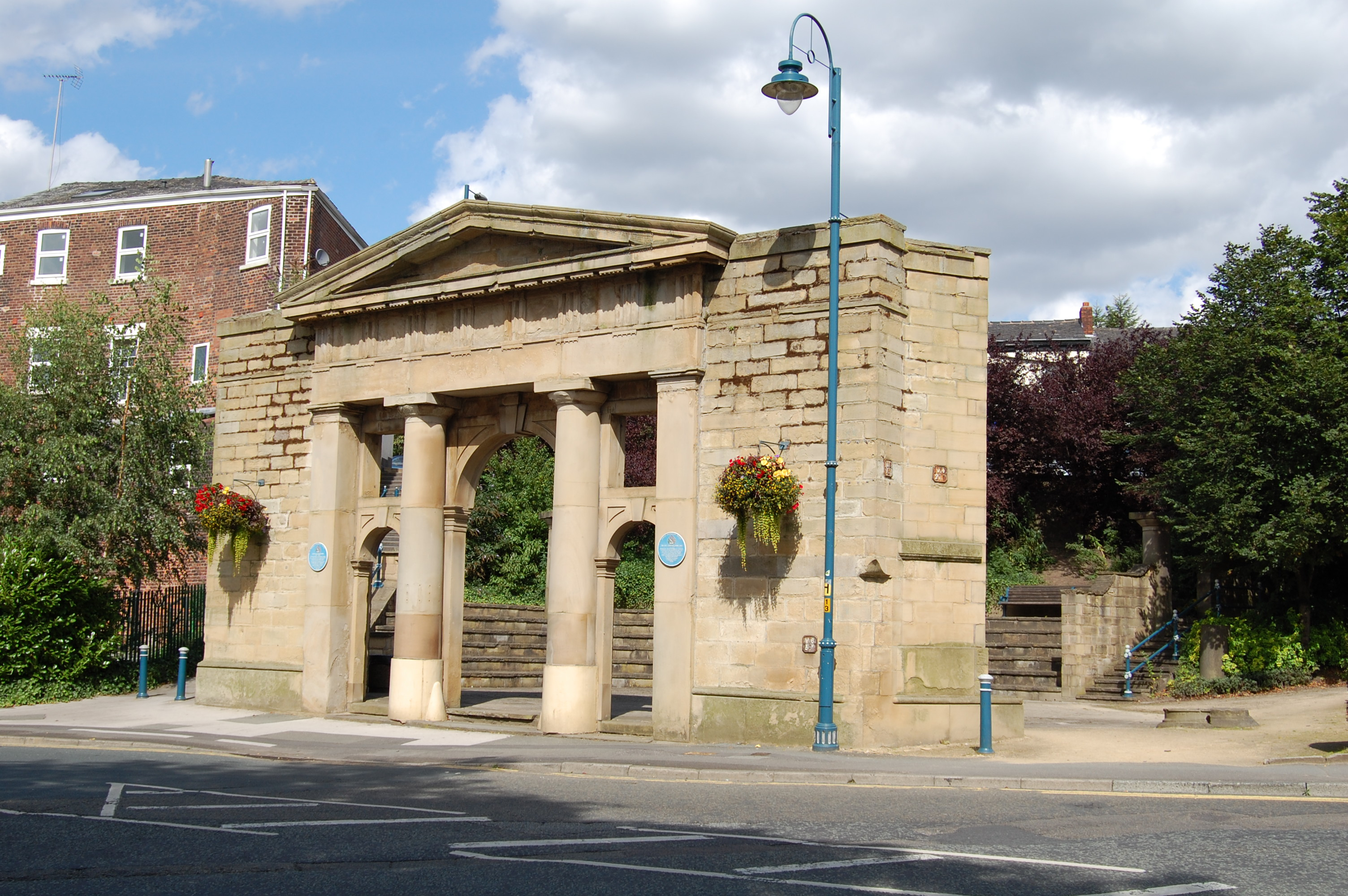
The lower part of the Waterloo Road elevation, the only surviving part of the original structure

Following a significant increase in population, largely associated with the cotton industry, Stalybridge became an independent town with its own board of commissioners appointed under the Stalybridge Police and Market Act 1828. In this context the town commissioners decided to procure a new town hall on a plot of land between Waterloo Road and Stamford Street. The site was donated by George Grey, 6th Earl of Stamford.

The new building was designed by Fairbairn & Lillie in the neoclassical style, built in ashlar stone and was officially opened on 30 December 1831. The design involved a three-storey symmetrical main frontage of three bays facing Waterloo Road; the ground floor featured a flush portico with three round headed openings separated by Tuscan order columns supporting an entablature with triglyphs and a pediment. The first and second floors were fenestrated by casement windows and the whole elevation was surmounted by a large pediment with an oculus in the tympanum. The building stretched back to Stamford Street but, as that frontage was situated in a more elevated position, the central section only consisted of two floors: the style was similar to the Waterloo Road elevation with a flush portico on the lower floor, three casement windows on the floor above and the whole section surmounted by a pediment with an oculus. On the Stamford Street elevation, the central section was flanked by single-storey sections and, at the corner with Market Street there was a further two-storey section with a mansard roof at the corner. Internally, the principal room was the market hall on the ground floor of the central section.

Following further expansion, Stalybridge became a municipal borough with the town hall as its headquarters in 1857. The American Civil War brought a shortage of cotton supplies for the local cotton mills and, in October 1862, a meeting was held in Stalybridge Town Hall that passed a resolution blaming the Confederate States of America and their actions in the American Civil War, rather than U.S. blockades of seaports, for the cotton famine in Lancashire. Conversely, the campaigner for factory reform, Rayner Stephens, speaking in the town hall, argued that the crisis was caused by the greed of the cotton mill owners.

In the early 1880s, the building was considerably extended to the southeast of the original structure with a new block, designed in the Italianate style, stretching along Market Street. The enlarged complex, which incorporated a public hall, a council chamber and a mayor's parlour, was opened on 22 September 1883.

A war memorial, designed by Ferdinand Victor Blundstone and intended to commemorate the lives of local service personnel who had died in the First World War, was erected facing the Waterloo Road entrance to the town hall and unveiled on 6 November 1921. The town hall ceased to be the local seat of government when the enlarged Tameside Metropolitan Borough Council was formed in 1974. The vacant building then became dilapidated: work started on its demolition but was accelerated by a major fire which destroyed what was left of the building in June 1989. The site was subsequently landscaped and turned into a garden. Blue plaques were subsequently placed on the lower part of the Waterloo Road elevation, the only surviving part of the original structure: they commemorated the general strike of 1842, the second phase of which originated in Stalybridge, and the life of the campaigner for factory reform, Rayner Stephens, who went on to establish a school in Stalybridge.

== See also ==
- Listed buildings in Stalybridge
