= Alexandra Park, Oldham =

Park in Greater Manchester, England

Alexandra Park
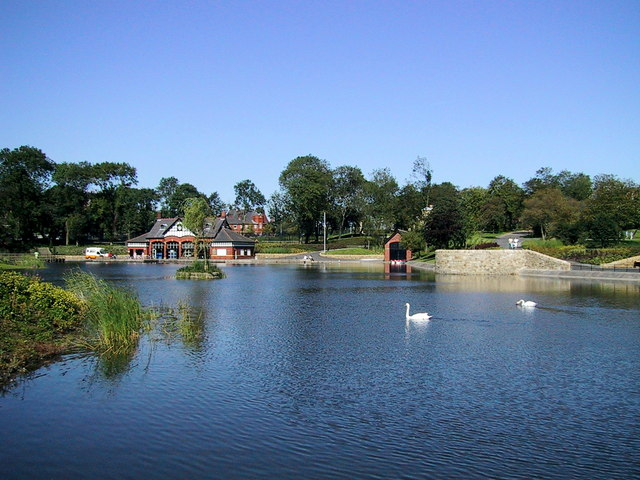
- The Boathouse and lake, in Alexandra Park
- Interactive map of Alexandra Park
- Type: Public park
- Location: Oldham, Greater Manchester, England
- Coordinates: 53°32′01″N 2°06′16″W
- Area: 23 hectares (57 acres)
- Created: 1861
- Website: Official website

National Register of Historic Parks and Gardens
- Official name: Alexandra Park
- Designated: 17 July 1995
- Reference no.: 1001338

Alexandra Park is a public park in Oldham, Greater Manchester, England. It was created in response to the Lancashire Cotton Famine of 1861–1865 as an attempt to keep local textile workers employed. The park is located in the Glodwick area of Oldham.

Oldham was hit hard by the Lancashire Cotton Famine of 1861–1865 when supplies of raw cotton from the United States were cut off. Wholly reliant upon the textile processing industry, the economy of Oldham strained as the cotton famine created chronic unemployment in the town. By 1863 a committee had been formed and with a loan from central government, land at Swine Clough was purchased from Reverend John Cocker of Shaw and Crompton whom made it a condition that local unemployed cotton workers were employed to construct the park which opened on 28 August 1865. John Thomas Cocker, Esq., of New-bank Heyside purchased the estate of Swine Clough in 1850 from the Ogden Family. This family enjoyed this estate for several generations. It was sold to Adam Ogden the elder in 1670 by Edmund Assheton, Esq., of Chadderton, Swine Clough was an ancient farm a short distance to the west of Glodwick.

Opened by Josiah M Radcliffe, the then Mayor of Oldham, the park was named to commemorate the marriage of Albert, Prince of Wales to Alexandra of Denmark. During its history it has had a "refreshment room", a boating lake (constructed in 1903) and been the site of statues honouring local Oldhamers of eminence.

A number of structures in the park are Grade II listed, including ornamental features, buildings and statues of John Platt and Robert Ascroft.

The park was granted Grade II listed status on 17 July 1995. This was upgraded to Grade II* on 27 August 2013 due to the number of Grade II structures and statues within the park. The listing designation also states that "it is an early example of a municipal park" which "although enhanced, the park's design is essentially unchanged from its original layout in the early 1860s". "It was designed by William Henderson, a leading landscape designer".

To the south of the park lies Northern Roots, a 160-acre (65 ha) urban farm and eco‑park created as part of Oldham's wider regeneration strategy and occupying land that stretches towards Bankfield Clough and the Medlock Valley.

== Gallery ==
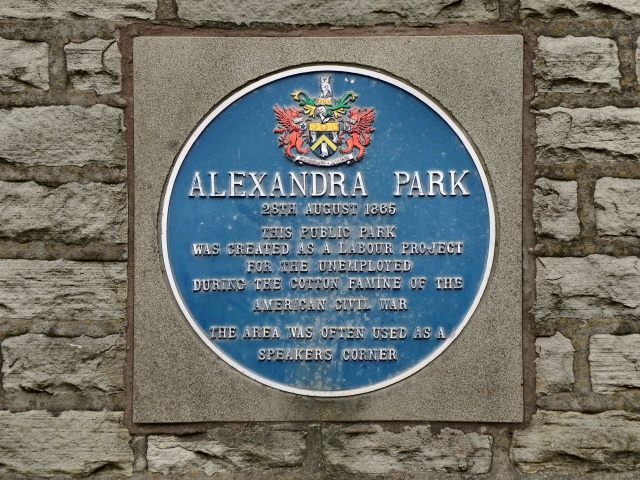
A blue plaque seen on the side of the North Lodge in Alexandra Park

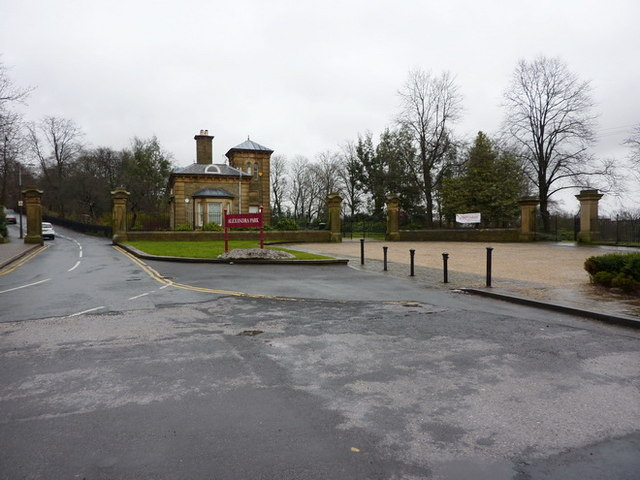
Entrance to Alexandra Park

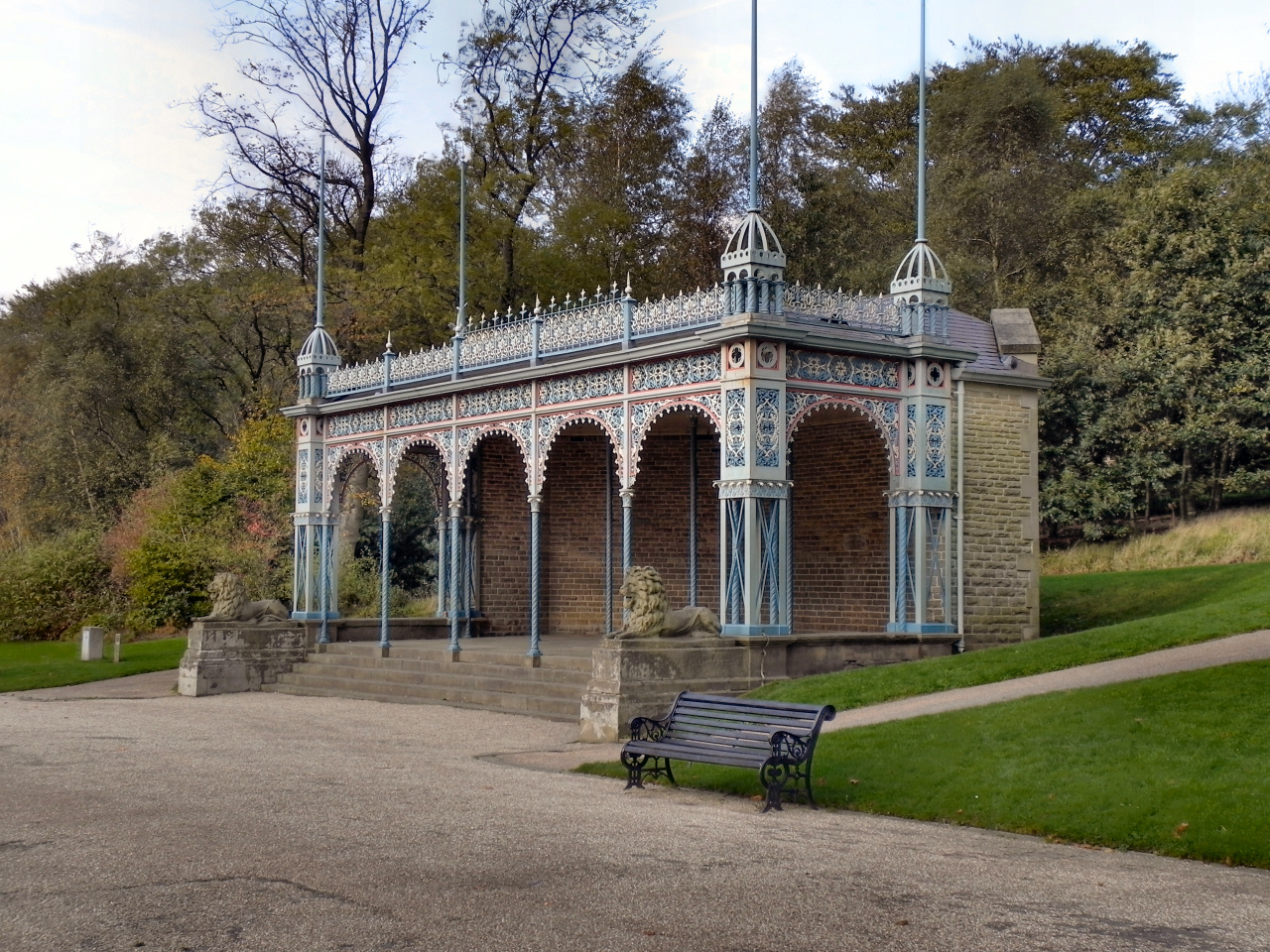
The Lion's Den

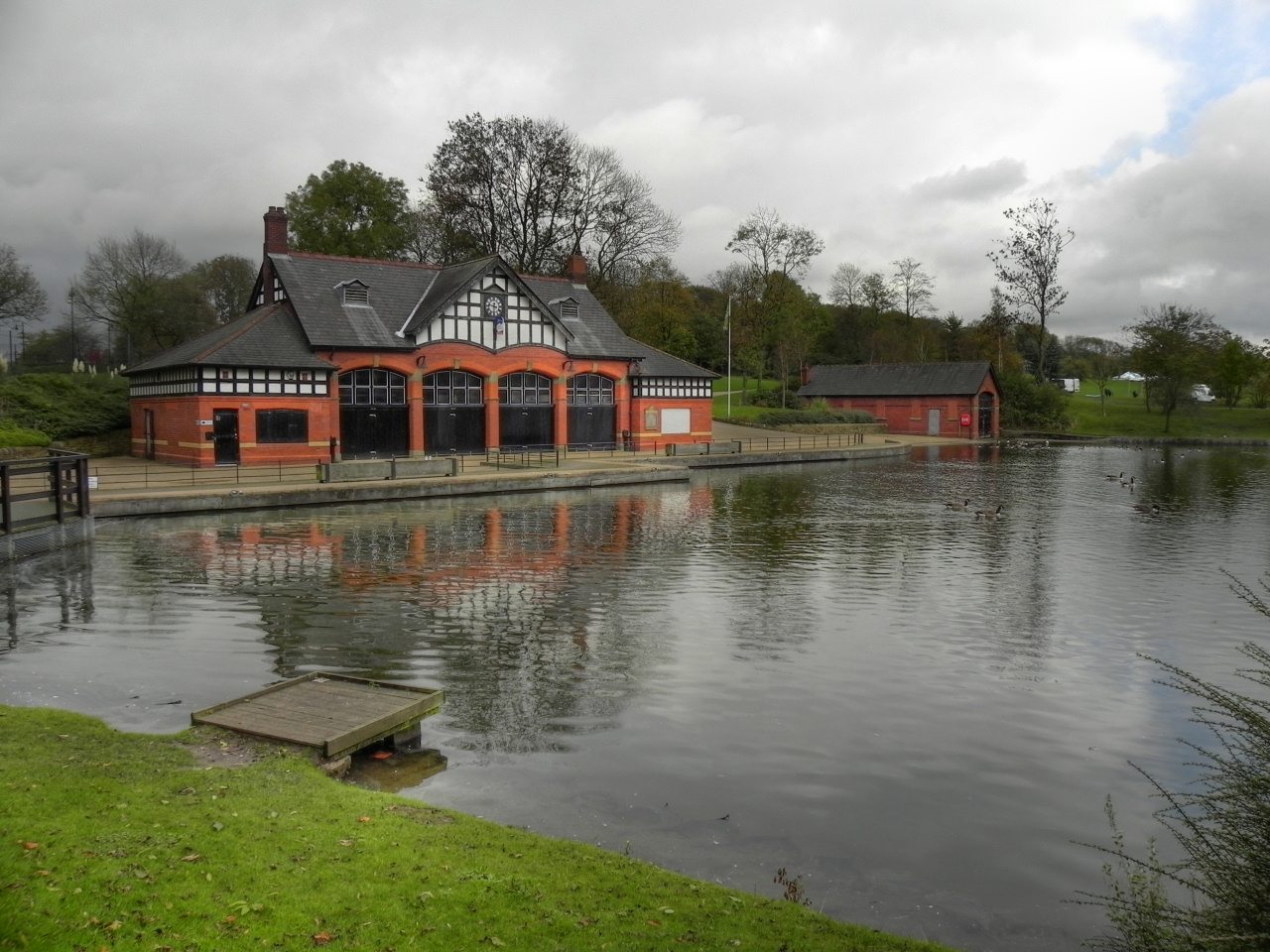
Boathouse and boating Lake

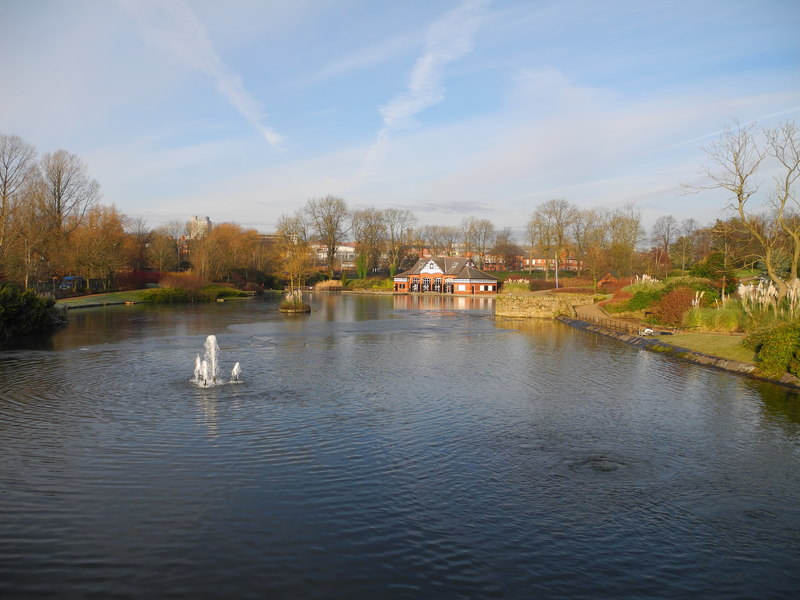

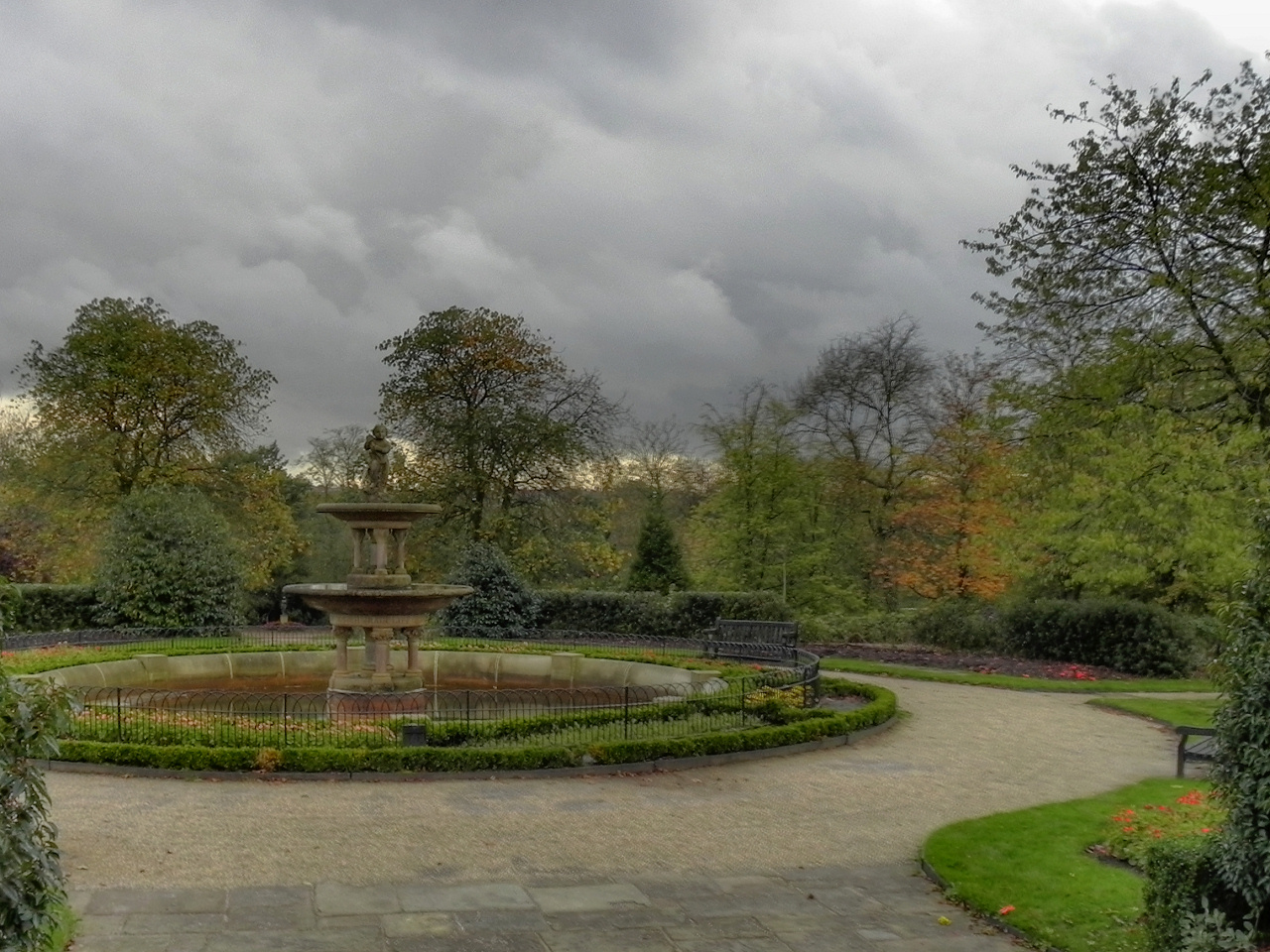
Fountain

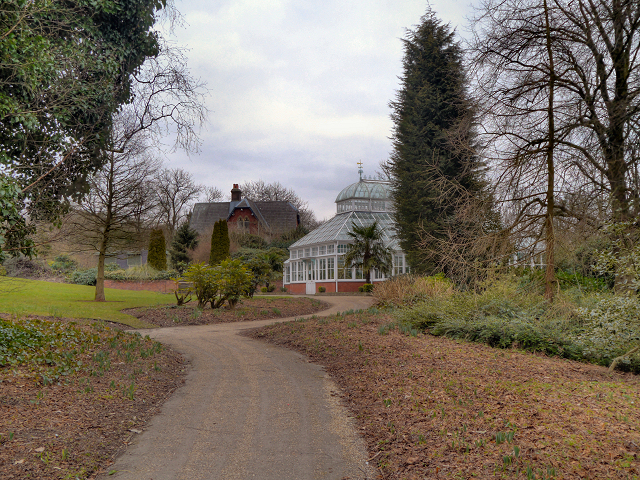
Alexandra Park conservatory
