= List of people from the Metropolitan Borough of Oldham =

This is a list of people from Oldham, in North West England. The demonym of Oldham is Oldhamer; however, this list may include people from Chadderton, Failsworth, Lees, Royton, Saddleworth, and Shaw and Crompton, all from the wider Metropolitan Borough of Oldham. This list is arranged alphabetically by surname.

== A ==
- Sir Elkanah Armitage (1794–1876) – industrialist and mayor of Manchester; born in Failsworth
- Mike Atherton (born 1968) – broadcaster, journalist and retired cricketer for Lancashire and England; born in Failsworth

== B ==
- Vera Baird (born 1950) – Labour politician, MP for Redcar, author and barrister
- Bobby Ball (1944–2020) – one half of comedy double act Cannon and Ball; born in Boundary Park General Hospital
- Tony Barber (born 1940) − radio and television host and Gold Logie winner
- Lydia Becker (1827–1890) – leading 19th-century suffragette, born in Chadderton's Foxdenton Hall
- Hannah Beswick (1688–1758) – woman who was so afraid of being buried alive that she insisted on her body being embalmed and kept above ground
- Christopher Biggins (born 1948) – television presenter, pantomime actor and winner of 2007's I'm a Celebrity...Get Me Out of Here!
- Scholes Birch (1826–1910) – first-class cricketer
- Lally Bowers (1914–1984) – actress, and next door neighbour to Dora Bryan
- Richard Bowker (born 1966) – railway businessman
- Helen Bradley (1900–1979) – 20th-century oil painter born in Lees in 1900
- Benjamin Brierley (1825–1896) – Failsworth-born weaver, poet and writer in Lancashire dialect
- Louise Brown (born 1978) – world's first baby conceived by in vitro fertilisation; born in Oldham General Hospital
- Dora Bryan (1923–2014) – Parbold-born actress, best known for her role in A Taste of Honey and as Roz in Last of the Summer Wine
- Will Buckley (born 1989) – footballer for Sunderland

== C ==
- Tommy Cannon (born 1938) – one half of comedy double act Cannon and Ball
- Ronald Castree (born 1953) – murderer convicted for the killing of Lesley Molseed
- Laurence Chaderton (c. 1536–1640) – one of the original translators of the Authorized King James Version of the Bible
- Brian Clarke (born 1953) – Oldham-born architectural artist and painter known for his work in stained glass
- J. R. Clynes (1869–1949) – Labour politician, MP for Manchester North East, leader of the Labour Party, 1921–22
- Jodie Connor (born 1981) – recording artist, lyricist, fashion model and goodwill ambassador for The Prince's Trust; from Shaw and Crompton
- Nicholas Connor (born 1999) – film director, born in Oldham
- Olivia Cooke (born 1993) – TV and film actress known for Bates Motel, Ouija and Me and Earl and the Dying Girl; from Oldham
- Brian Cox (born 1968) – Chadderton-born television presenter, particle physicist, Royal Society research fellow, and professor at the University of Manchester
- Carl Cox (born 1962) – record producer and DJ, born in Oldham
- Bernard Cribbins (1928–2022) – character actor and musical comedian
- Don Cupitt (born 1934) – English philosopher of religion and scholar of Christian theology

== D ==
- Agyness Deyn (born 1983) – Failsworth-raised supermodel
- David Dyson (1823–1856) – naturalist, scientific collector, curator and weaver

== E ==
- Paul Edwards (born 1947) – ex-association footballer who played for Manchester United, Oldham Athletic and Stockport County
- Karen Elson (born 1979) – Chadderton-raised supermodel and singer-songwriter

== F ==
- Kate Fenton (born 1954) – Failsworth-born novelist and former BBC radio producer
- Siobhan Finneran (born 1966) – Oldham-born television, film and theatre actress; Happy Valley and The Loch
- Kelvin Fletcher (born 1984) – former Emmerdale actor
- George Ford (born 1993) – Oldham-born England rugby union player
- Des Foy (born 1963) – Great Britain, Ireland and Oldham rugby league footballer; director of Rugby League Ireland
- Roy Fuller (1912–1991) – Failsworth-born writer, known mostly as a poet

== G ==
- Ian Greaves (1932–2009) – Shaw and Crompton-born association football player and manager; one of the Busby Babes
- Nick Grimshaw (born 1984) – television presenter and DJ; raised in Oldham
- Shobna Gulati (born 1966) – Oldham-born actress, writer and dancer

== H ==
- Terry Hall (1926–2007) – pioneering ventriloquist and early children's television entertainer
- Philip Gilbert Hamerton (1834–1894) – etcher, painter and art critic; born in Crompton in 1834
- Graham Harding (born 1966) – cricketer
- Paul Harrison (born 1945) – Oldham-born writer on environment and development; founder of the World Pantheist Movement
- Jack Hilton (1900–1983) – British novelist, essayist, and travel writer
- John Hogan (1884–1943) – Royton-born recipient of the Victoria Cross, the highest military decoration awarded for valour "in the face of the enemy" to members of the British and Commonwealth forces
- Arthur Hutchinson (1889–1969) – professor of dentistry

== I ==
- Inspiral Carpets (first formed 1980) – Madchester/indie rock band

== J ==
- Nicole Jackson (born 1992) – professional ice hockey player for Göteborg HC and the Great Britain women's national ice hockey team
- Lee Jasper (born 1958) – race equality activist and champion of over 30 years originally from Manchester
- Suranne Jones (born 1978) – Chadderton-born actress who played Karen McDonald in Coronation Street
- William Joyce (1906–1946) – Brooklyn-born fascist politician and Nazi propagandist; short-term resident of Glodwick in Oldham

== K ==
- Annie Kenney (1879–1953) – one of the first suffragettes to be imprisoned for protesting for women's suffrage
- Ian Kershaw (born 1943) – historian, regarded by many as one of the world's leading experts on Adolf Hitler and Nazi Germany
- Anne Kirkbride (1954–2015) – soap opera actress best known for playing Deirdre Barlow in Coronation Street
- Jack Kirkbride (1923–2006) – cartoonist who worked for the Oldham Evening Chronicle
- John Kneller (1916–2009) – English-American professor and fifth President of Brooklyn College
- Barbara Knox (born 1933) – soap opera actress best known for playing Rita Sullivan in Coronation Street

== L ==
- Sarah Lancashire (born 1964) – Oldham-born television actress
- John Lees – Royton-born inventor who made a substantial improvement to machinery for carding cotton in 1772
- Ralf Little (born 1980) – television actor, best known for his roles in The Royle Family and Two Pints of Lager and a Packet of Crisps
- Eric Longworth (1918–2008) – Shaw-born actor, best known for his semi-regular part in sitcom Dad's Army, as the town clerk of Walmington-on-Sea

== M ==
- Michelle Marsh (born 1982) – glamour model and page 3 girl
- Matthew Maynard (born 1966) – former England Test cricketer
- William McDougall (1871–1938) – Chadderton-born psychologist and writer of several highly influential textbooks
- Liz McInnes (born 1959) – former Labour MP for Heywood and Middleton North
- Fergus Mills (1840–1924) – member of the Wisconsin State Assembly
- Simon Moore (born 1974) – cricketer

== N ==
- N-Trance (formed 1990) – dance music producers

== O ==
- Kieran O'Brien (born 1973) – actor who gained notoriety for his role in the 2004 film 9 Songs
- Mark Owen (born 1972) – member of boyband Take That; born and raised in Oldham

== P ==
- David Platt (born 1966) – association footballer, formerly captain of the England national football team; born in Chadderton
- Tony Prince (born 1944) – British radio disc jockey and businessman

== R ==
- Tony Radakin (born 1965) – senior Royal Navy officer
- Akke Rahman (born 1982) – British Bengali mountaineer
- Alan Rankle (born 1952) – artist
- Jim Ratcliffe (born 1952) – founder and CEO of Ineos, raised in Failsworth
- Hervey Rhodes, Baron Rhodes (1895–1987) – Greenfield-born Labour party politician and life peer
- Andy Ritchie (born 1960) – former Oldham Athletic player and manager
- Roy Rolland (1921–1997) – comedian and stage actor who appeared as Old Mother Riley from the 1950s to 1980s
- Alan Rothwell (born 1937) – actor and television presenter
- Clive Rowe (born 1964) – actor

== S ==
- Sahil Saeed (born 2004) – British Pakistani from Shaw and Crompton who was kidnapped for ransom in Pakistan in 2010
- Phillip Schofield (born 1962) – Oldham-born television presenter
- Paul Sculthorpe (born 1977) – England and St Helens RLFC player and captain
- Ruth Shevelen (born 1992) – trampoline gymnast
- Edward Sinclair (1914–1977) – television actor, Dad's Army
- Kevin Sinfield (born 1980) – England and Leeds RLFC player and captain
- Nicola Stephenson (born 1971) – television actress
- Philip Sydney Stott, 1st Baronet (1858–1937) – Chadderton-born architect, civil engineer and surveyor of cotton mills
- William Stott (1857–1900) – impressionist painter
- Eric Sykes (1923–2012) – comedy writer and actor

== T ==
- Henry Taylor (1885–1951) – British Olympic freestyle swimming triple gold medallist and champion
- Kevin Thaw (born 1967) – alpinist, climber; many first and notable ascents, member of the North Face climbing team, Altitude Everest Expedition 2007
- Stephen Timms (born 1955) – British Labour Party politician and MP for East Ham
- Geoff Tootill (1922–2017) – Chadderton-born scientist helped create the Manchester Baby in 1948, the world's first wholly electronic stored program computer
- Dame Eva Turner (1892–1990) – soprano opera singer; born in Werneth
- Twisted Wheel (formed 2007) – punk rock trio; reside in Oldham

== W ==
- Jane Walsh (born c. 1905) – textile worker and writer
- Paul Walsh (born 1955) – Chadderton-born Chief Executive of Diageo
- Sir William Walton (1902–1983) – composer and conductor
- Darren Wharton (born 1961) – keyboardist for rock band Thin Lizzy
- Nicola White (born 1988) – hockey player for England and Team GB
- Annie Whitehead (born 1955) – jazz trombone player
- Ronald Whittam (1925–2023) – physiologist
- Ricky Whittle (born 1979) – Oldham-born model and actor
- Jack Wild (1952–2006) – Royton-born Academy Award-nominated actor, played the Artful Dodger in the 1968 musical film Oliver!
- Phil Woolas (born 1959) – Lincolnshire-born politician representing Oldham East and Saddleworth; lives in Lees
- Arthur Worsley (1920–2001) – Failsworth-born ventriloquist; appeared regularly on British television from the 1950s to the 1970s
