= Ralph Staveley =

Lord of the manor of Staley Hall, Stalybridge, England

Sir Ralph Staley or Ralph de Stavelegh (c.1362-c.1420) was lord of the manor of Staley Hall, Stalybridge, England. His stone effigy is to be found in St Michael and All Angels Church, Mottram.
