= Listed buildings in Stalybridge =

Stalybridge is a town in Tameside, Greater Manchester, England. The town, together with the village of Millbrook and the surrounding countryside, contains 55 listed buildings that are recorded in the National Heritage List for England. Of these, two are listed at Grade II*, the middle grade, and the others are at Grade II, the lowest grade. Initially rural and agricultural, the cotton industry came to the area in 1776. The older listed buildings are houses, farmhouses and farm buildings, and later listed buildings include structures associated with the Huddersfield Narrow Canal, mills, public houses, schools, churches, civic buildings, a bridge, and a war memorial.

== Key ==
Grade	Criteria
II*	Particularly important buildings of more than special interest
II	Buildings of national importance and special interest

== Buildings ==
Name and location	Photograph	Date	Notes	Grade
Stayley Hall and west wing 53.49418°N 2.03814°W		Late 16th century	A timber framed manor house that was encased in stone with quoins in the 17th and early 18th centuries, and has a stone-slate roof. It is mainly in three storeys, and consists of a main range, east and west cross-wings, and a long two-storey service wing to the extreme west. It has a front of five bays, all gabled, the second bay being a two-storey porch, and the fourth bay also lower with two storeys. Above the doorway is a segmental arch, and the windows are mullioned with hood moulds.	II*
Higher Little Bank Farmhouse and barn 53.50009°N 2.02418°W	—	Late 17th century (possible)	The oldest part is a wing, with the major part dating from the 1740s. The farmhouse and barn are in stone, the farmhouse has a stone-slate roof and the barn has 20th-century tiles. The house has two storeys, a single-depth plan, three bays, the wing at right angles to the right, a rear outshut, and the barn is to the left. The doorway has a square-cut surround, there is a 20th-century porch, and the windows are mullioned.	II
Moorgate Farmhouse, barn and shippon 53.50747°N 2.02560°W	—	Late 17th century	The building was extended on both sides in the 18th century. It consists of a farmhouse, two cottages, a barn and a shippon. They are in stone with a stone-slate roof, they have two storeys, and form a long single-depth range on a projecting plinth. Most of the windows are mullioned, and the farmhouse has a central doorway with a moulded surround. In the barn is a segmental-arched cart entry with a keystone.	II
Lukes Fold Farmhouse; 53.47444°N 2.02821°W	—	1699	The farmhouse was much altered in the 18th century. It is in stone and has a stone-slate roof with one coped gable. There are two storeys, six bays, a two-storey porch wing, and a 20th-century porch. In the porch wing are mullioned windows with hood moulds. Elsewhere are bow windows and casement windows, and there is one mullioned window at the rear. The dated lintel has been replaced above a bow window.	II
The Ashes; 53.47778°N 2.03945°W	—	1712	A stone house with quoins and a stone-slate roof with coped gables. It has two storeys with attics, three bays, and a 20th-century garage to the right. The central doorway has a segmental head, a chamfered surround, and a dated keystone, and the windows are mullioned. In the attic is a dormer with an oeil-de-boeuf set vertically, coped gables, and finials.	II
Lower Hyde Green Farmhouse; 53.49531°N 2.02472°W	—	1714	A farmhouse with a barn to the right, in stone with a stone-slate roof. The house has quoins, two storeys, two bays, a rear wing, and a 20th-century lean-to on the left. There is a doorway with a chamfered surround and a dated keystone, and the windows are mullioned. The barn is later, and has a doorway, windows, one mullioned, two blocked doors and a hayloft hatch.	II
4 and 6 School Lane; 53.50757°N 2.02493°W	—	Early 18th century	Formerly four cottages, later two houses, in stone, rendered at the rear, with a stone-slate roof. They have two storeys, a single-depth plan, five bays, and a rear outshut. There are two porches, and the windows are mullioned.	II
The Fold House; 53.50254°N 2.01950°W	—	Early 18th century	Originally cottages that were extended at both ends, and later combined into one house, it is in stone with a stone-slate roof. There are five bays, the first four bays have two storeys and a single-depth plan, and the fifth bay has three storeys and a double-depth plan. On the front is a single-storey porch wing, and there is a later porch in the fifth bay. The windows are mullioned.	II
Stocks; 53.48643°N 2.07236°W	—	1730	The stocks are in Stamford Park. They consist of two stone posts with shaped heads, and are grooved for foot restraints, which have been replaced. One of the stock ends is sheathed in cast iron. The stocks were originally outside Ashton-under-Lyne workhouse.	II
Stable wing, Moorgate House; 53.50778°N 2.02594°W	—	Early to mid-18th century	Originally a shippon, barn and cottage, later stables, the building is in stone with a stone-slate roof, and has three bays. In the first bay is a segmental-headed door, the second bay contains a door with a square-cut surround, two windows and a hayloft, and the third bay has two storeys, with a doorway on the ground floor and mullioned windows on both floors.	II
4 and 5 Lower Hyde Green and farm buildings 53.49558°N 2.02460°W	—	Mid-18th century	A house, formerly two cottages, and farm buildings in stone with a stone-slate roof. The house is on a projecting plinth and has quoins, mullioned windows, two storeys and two bays. The farm building to the right contains two square-cut doorways, an owl holes, loft hatches and a blocked doorway.	II
9, 9A, 10, 11 and 12 School Lane; 53.50830°N 2.02374°W	—	Mid-18th century	A row of five stone houses with a stone-slate roof. They have two storeys, most have a single-depth plan, and there is a total of eight bays. Between Nos. 11 and 12 is a segmental-headed cart entrance. The doorways have square-cut surrounds, and the windows are mullioned.	II
Stamford Arms; 53.50900°N 2.02847°W		Mid-18th century	A public house, extended in the 19th century, it is in stone with a slate roof. The building consists of a three-storey, two-bay house with a double-depth plan, a barn to the left, a 19th-century one-bay extension to the right, lean-tos at the rear, and a small brick extension. In the original part is a central doorway with a square-cut surround, and mullioned windows. The former barn has a segmental headed cart entry and a doorway, both blocked, and the extension has casement windows and a hipped roof.	II
Sun Green Farmhouse and Cottage; 53.49404°N 2.02571°W	—	Mid-18th century	The farmhouse and attached cottage are in stone with a slate roof. Both have two storeys and a double-depth plan, the farmhouse has two bays, and the cottage has one. The farmhouse is on a projecting plinth, and has a central doorway, and the doorway in the cottage is on the left. The windows in both parts are mullioned.	II
113 and 115 Mottram Old Road; 53.47242°N 2.03263°W	—	18th century	A pair of stone houses with a stone-slate roof, the right two bays added in the 19th century. The houses have three storeys and a double-depth plan, No. 113 has two bays, and No. 115 has three, there is a 20th-century lean-to garage at the left and a small two-storey wing at the rear. In the second bay is a doorway with a square-cut surround, and the windows in the first three bays are mullioned. The other two bays were later, and have rusticated quoins, a doorway with a rusticated surround, and sash windows, some with mullions.	II
Barn south of Stayley Hall; 53.49366°N 2.03789°W	—	18th century	The barn is in stone with a stone-slate roof and has an L-shaped plan. There is a cart door to the west, and elsewhere are doors, windows and hayloft openings.	II
Barn southeast of Stayley Hall; 53.49401°N 2.03770°W	—	18th century	The barn is in stone with a stone-slate roof. It contains opposing cart entries, haylofts and vents.	II
176, 178, and 180 Mottram Old Road; 53.46994°N 2.03079°W	—	1753	Three stone houses with a stone-slate roof, two storeys, a double-depth plan, a projecting 20th-century bay added to the left, and a lean-to garage at the right. To the right of the doorway of No. 178 is a segmental-headed window, and above it is a datestone. The other windows are mullioned.	II
154 Mottram Old Road; 53.47178°N 2.03217°W	—	Mid to late 18th century	A stone house with a stone-slate roof and three storeys, it is one room wide and two deep. There is a doorway with a square-cut surround on the front, and another doorway on the left side. The windows are mullioned.	II
574 and 576 Huddersfield Road; 53.50604°N 2.02749°W	—	Mid to late 18th century	This consists of a barn with a cottage behind, and a later house to the right, all in stone with stone-slate roofs. The house has three storeys with an attic, a double-depth plan, three bays, a central door with a square-cut surround, and mullioned windows. In the right gable end are two taking-in doors and a blocked attic window. The barn has a segmental-headed cart entry with a keystone, a shippon door, and a loft hatch. The cottage has a lean-to porch, mullioned windows, and an owl hole. (Note: Street View in June 2016 shows that the barn has been converted for residential use.)	II
Cote Farmhouse; 53.49173°N 2.02535°W	—	Mid to late 18th century	A stone farmhouse with a stone-slate roof, three storeys, a double-depth plan, one bay, and a single-storey 19th-century extension with quoins to the right. Also on the right is a porch, and in each floor is a five-light mullioned window.	II
5 and 6 Sun Green; 53.49483°N 2.02555°W	—	Late 18th century	Originally one house, later divided into two, it is in stone, rebuilt in brick at the rear, and has a stone-slate roof. The houses have two storeys, a double-depth plan, one bay each, and entries in the gable ends. The windows are mullioned, and there is a porch in the right gable.	II
401 and 403 Wakefield Road; 53.49821°N 2.04249°W	—	Late 18th century	A pair of stone houses with a roof of slate and stone-slate. Each house has three storeys, a double-depth plan, and one bay. The doorways have square-cut surrounds and porches. Most windows are mullioned, there are two 19th-century oriel windows on the left side, and a 19th-century bay window at the rear.	II
Higher Croft; 53.49726°N 2.04701°W	—	Late 18th century	A pair of stone houses with a slate roof, three storeys, a double-depth plan, and one bay each. There is a two-storey 20th-century extension to the right. In the left gable end is a porch, and in each floor is a five-light mullioned window.	II
Moorfield House; 53.49748°N 2.04462°W	—	Late 18th century	A stone house with quoins to the left, and a stone-slate roof. It has three storeys, a double-depth plan, two bays, and a two-storey, gabled, 20th-century extension to the left. In the centre is a porch and a doorway with a square-cut surround, and there are two five-light mullioned windows in each floor.	II
The Cottage and Tonge Green House; 53.46831°N 2.03129°W	—	1782	A house and cottage in stone with roofs of slate and stone-slate. Each has two storeys and a double-depth plan, the house has two bays, and the cottage has one. The door to the house is in the middle of the front, and there is a porch to the cottage on the gable end. Some windows are mullioned, and others are sashes.	II
14, 16 and 18 John Street; 53.49817°N 2.04292°W	—	1788	A row of three stone houses with a slate roof, No. 18 being dated 1796. They have three storeys, a double-depth plan, one bay each, and a recessed garage extension on the left. Each house has a doorway to the left with a square-cut surround and a dated lintel, and a five-light mullioned window in each floor.	II
Old cross 53.48629°N 2.07074°W		1793	The cross is in Stamford Park. It is in stone, and consists of a square base, a moulded plinth, and a tapering square shaft surmounted by a sphere decorated with fern leaves. On the shaft is an inscription.	II
Milestone; 53.48521°N 2.04997°W	—	1794–1797	The milestone is set into a wall alongside the Huddersfield Narrow Canal. It is rectangular with a curved head and a round indented face inscribed with "18 miles".	II
Stakes Aqueduct and tow-path bridge 53.48082°N 2.07023°W		1800	The aqueduct carries the Huddersfield Narrow Canal over the River Tame, and it crosses the river in parallel with the tow-path bridge. The aqueduct has a cast iron trough consisting of rectangular sections bolted together. The tow-path bridge is in stone, and consists of a humped elliptical arch with a band, and a parapet with round copings. On the bridge is a milestone and a benchmark.	II
Toll bar cottage 53.49273°N 2.04704°W	—	c. 1800	A stone cottage with a stone-slate roof, one storey at the front and two at the rear, and with two rooms. The gable end faces the road, and contains a doorway with a pointed arch, a square-cut surround, and a fanlight. On the sides are sash windows with pointed arched heads.	II
Castle Street Mills; 53.48283°N 2.05985°W		1805	A cotton mill that was extended later in the century, and then converted for other uses. It is in brick with stone dressings and has a slate roof. The oldest and only surviving wing has four storeys and a total of 24 bays. The windows vary, and include a Venetian window in the gable. Other features include a vehicle entry with a depressed arch, a doorway with several orders, a tall round-headed window, and a datestone.	II
West Hill High School for boys 53.48641°N 2.06612°W	—	1822	Originally a house, the school is in stone on a projecting plinth, with a band, an eaves cornice, a blocking course, and a hipped slate roof. There are two storeys, five bays on the front and seven on the right side. On the front is an enclosed tetrastyle Ionic porch, and the windows are sashes. On the right side two bays project, and have giant pilasters and an open pediment.	II
18, 20 and 22 Portland Place; 53.48378°N 2.05226°W	—	Early 19th century	A terrace of three houses in stone with roofs of stone slabs. They have three storeys and seven bays. The windows are sashes, most with wedge lintels, and the doorways have round heads, moulded surrounds, and fanlights. At the rear are round-headed stair windows.	II
Former Corn Mill Buildings; 53.48364°N 2.05183°W	—	Early 19th century	The buildings are in stone, and consist of a gateway, and office and a warehouse forming a wedge-shaped plan. The entrance has a depressed arch with voussoirs, keystones and moulded imposts, and one bay to the left. The office has two bays, and the warehouse have four storeys and seven bays, some with pediments.	II
Copley Mills; 53.48572°N 2.04238°W		c. 1827	A cotton mill that was later extended, including an engine house in 1871. It is in stone with a stone-slate roof, partly hipped, and has an internal construction of cylindrical cast iron columns. There are four and five storeys, fronts of 45 and eleven bays, an engine house and chimney at the southwest, and an office wing to the northeast. The windows are 20th-century casements, and there are large blocked elliptical-headed carriageways. The engine house has a doorway with a timber pediment, and round-headed windows with keystones, and the chimney has a tapering octagonal shaft.	II
Bankwood Mill; 53.48058°N 2.04975°W	—	c. 1830	An integrated cotton mill, later used for other purposes, it is in stone with slate roofs, and has an internal structure of cast iron and brick. The ranges are mainly in four storeys, and together with the weaving sheds are arranged around a courtyard. The office block is in Tudor style, and there is a Tudor arched cart entrance.	II
Former Town Hall; 53.48405°N 2.05648°W		1831	The town hall was extended during the 19th century, but became disused, and it was demolished, other than part of the façade, in the 20th century. This is in ashlar stone and consists of a portico with two Greek Doric columns, two pilasters, a triglyph frieze, and an entablature, and it is flanked by short walls.	II
St Peter's Church; 53.48011°N 2.05334°W	—	1838–39	A Roman Catholic church designed by Matthew Ellison Hadfield in Early English style, in sandstone with slate roofs. The church consists of a nave and a sanctuary under a single roof. At the west end are corner angle buttresses and buttresses flanking the central bay, all rising to octagonal pinnacles, and there are similar pinnacles at the east end.	II
St George's Church; 53.48741°N 2.05791°W		1838–1840	A Commissioners' church designed by Edmund Sharpe, in stone with a slate roof that has coped gables. It consists of a nave, north and south aisles, a small chancel, and a west tower. The tower has three stages, octagonal buttressed corner piers that rise to pinnacles, and a clock aperture. The windows are lancets, and contain Geometrical tracery.	II
St Paul's Church; 53.48518°N 2.04413°W		1839	The transepts and clerestory were added in 1872. The church is in stone with slate roofs, and consists of a nave with a clerestory, north and south aisles, north and south transepts, a chancel, and a west tower. The tower has three stages, angled buttresses, a west door, a two-light west window, clock faces, and an embattled parapet with corner pinnacles. There are also pinnacles on the corners of the transepts. The windows in the aisles are paired lancets, in the transepts they are triple lancets, and in the clerestory there are triangular windows.	II
St Paul's School; 53.48566°N 2.04575°W	—	1841	The school was later extended. It is in stone on a plinth, and has quoins and slate roofs with coped gables and finials. There is a single storey, and fronts of seven and four bays. The second and sixth bays project forward, they are gabled, and contain doorways and inscribed panels. The windows are mullioned with hood moulds. The extension to the left has a tower-like entrance with pilasters and a pyramidal roof.	II
Heyrod Bridge; 53.49849°N 2.04167°W		Mid to late 1840s	The bridge was built to carry Spring Bank Lane over the Huddersfield and Manchester Railway. It is in sandstone, and consists of a single segmental arch sloping towards the east. The bridge has rusticated voussoirs, and the arch springs from an impost band. There is a carriageway band, and a low parapet with flat coping stones.	II
Heyrod Hall Bridge; 53.49479°N 2.04368°W		Mid to late 1840s	The bridge was built to carry the lane to Heyrod Hall over the Huddersfield and Manchester Railway. It is in sandstone, and consists of a single segmental arch. The bridge has rusticated voussoirs, and the arch springs from an impost band. There is a carriageway band, and a low parapet with flat coping stones.	II
Holy Trinity Church; 53.48261°N 2.05566°W		1851–52	The church was designed by E. H. Shellard, it is in stone and has slate roofs with gables and cross finials. The church consists of a nave with a clerestory, north and south aisles, a north porch, a chancel, and a west tower. The tower has three stages, a west door with an ogee-headed and crocketed hood mould, a three-light west window, clock apertures, and an embattled parapet. Along the sides of the church are moulded bands, and parapets with gargoyles and moulded copings.	II
Oakwood Mill; 53.49366°N 2.03377°W		1856	Built as a specialised spinning mill, it is no longer is use and is derelict. It is in millstone grit, and had Welsh slate roofs. There are two ranges at right angles, forming a U-shaped plan. The south range, a warehouse, had three storeys, and sides of 19 and four bays, and the north range, the mill, had four storeys and sides of 28 and six bays. There is an embattled clock tower and a chimney.	II
St James' Church, Millbrook; 53.49532°N 2.03002°W		1861–1863	The church is in stone with a slate roof. It consists of a nave, a north porch, a south aisle, a chancel, and a northeast steeple. The steeple has a tower with three stages, an embattled stair turret, clasping buttresses, and a broach spire. The windows contain Geometrical tracery.	II
Former Victoria Market, now Stalybridge Civic Hall; 53.48298°N 2.05566°W		1866	The market hall is in brick with stone dressings and has a corrugated asbestos roof. It has a front of seven bays, sides of 13 bays, and contains three aisles. The front is on a stone rusticated plinth, and has a band, a bracketed eaves cornice, and a pierced parapet. The central bay projects, with rusticated quoins, a round-arched opening with a keystone, and a fanlight. It is flanked by giant pilasters that support a modillioned pediment. From this rises a tower with clock faces, and a roof with ornate cast iron railings, a canopy and a finial. In the other bays are round-headed blind arches, and along the sides are round-headed windows.	II
Victoria Bridge; 53.48359°N 2.05636°W		1867	The bridge carries Trinity Street over the River Tame. It consists of two flat wrought iron girder spans on a central stone pier. The bridge has a cast iron parapet with balusters, a post with a coat of arms and the date, and an ornate lamp standard.	II
Public library 53.48331°N 2.05610°W		1897–1901	The library was designed by J. Medland Taylor in Jacobean style. The ground floor is in stone, above it is in brick with stone dressings, and the roof is tiled. The building is on a projecting plinth, and has a band, cornices, quoins, and coped gables with ball finials. There are two storeys with an attic, and an asymmetrical front of six bays. There is a porch with a round-headed entrance flanked by ionic columns with an inscribed entablature. The windows are mullioned and transomed. In the right return is a bow window.	II
Post office 53.48346°N 2.05617°W		1901	The ground floor of the post office is in stone, and above it is in brick with stone dressings, the roof is tiled, and it is in Renaissance style. The front range has a plinth, a band, cornices, a parapet, and coped gables. There are two storeys with an attic, and three bays. The larger central bay projects, and contains mullioned and transomed windows, a cartouche with an inscription between the floors, and at the top is a broken pediment and a finial. In the outer bays are round-headed doorways, and in the attics are pedimented dormers. Behind the front office range are a sorting office, a service wing and a boiler house, all with a single storey and basements.	II
Thorn House; 53.48444°N 2.05784°W		1903–04	This consists of a linear office block facing the street, and an electricity generating station at the rear. The building is in red brick with sandstone dressings and a Welsh slate roof, and is in free baroque style. The front has two storeys with attics on a shallow plinth, and is symmetrical with a total of eleven bays, the outer bays projecting forward under pediments. The entrance is in the central bay, with an open pediment above the doorway, and a segmental pediment at eaves level. In the attics are dormers with segmental roofs. The generating station has five bays, and a ground floor arcade with lunettes at the heads.	II
Former Sunday school 53.48345°N 2.05669°W	—	1904–05	The former Sunday school is in stone with sandstone dressings and a Welsh slate roof. There are two storeys, and the windows are mullioned and transomed. The entrance has a pedimented porch containing a doorway with a moulded surround. Above it is a shaped parapet and a coped gable with finials, and at the sides are buttresses. Behind the entrance the main block is taller and has a central cupola.	II
War memorial 53.48374°N 2.05654°W		c. 1921	The war memorial, designed by F. V. Blundstone, is in two parts on the east and west sides of Trinity Street. On each side is a segmental wall partly enclosing a garden, and ending in inscribed piers. The piers at the south ends have moulded bases, coats of arms, and swept abutments, and are surmounted by bronze statues of angelic figures supporting wounded servicemen in battledress, on one side a soldier, and on the other side a sailor. At the north end the piers are smaller and the statues are of stone lions. On the walls are granite plaques inscribed with the names of those lost in the two World Wars.	II*
St Raphael's Church, Millbrook; 53.49708°N 2.02950°W		1961–1963	A Roman Catholic church, in brick and concrete, now redundant. It has a rectangular plan, with a narthex and baptistry at the west end, a nave, a crossing above which is a dome 45 feet (14 m) in diameter with a clerestory, transepts approached by spiral staircases, and a chapel at the east. Along the south sides are sacristies and confessionals. On the north side is an entrance with a colonnade on circular columns. Apart from the dome, the roofs are flat.	II

== Notes and references ==
=== Sources ===
- Historic England, "Staley Hall and adjoining west wing, Stalybridge (1163021)", National Heritage List for England
- Historic England, "Higher Little Bank Farmhouse and adjoining barn, Stalybridge (1068014)", National Heritage List for England
- Historic England, "Moorgate Farmhouse and adjoining barn and shippon, Stalybridge (1309369)", National Heritage List for England
- Historic England, "Lukes Fold Farmhouse, Stalybridge (1163061)", National Heritage List for England
- Historic England, "Higher Little Bank Farmhouse and adjoining barn, Stalybridge (1068014)", National Heritage List for England
- Historic England, "The Ashes, Stalybridge (1068016)", National Heritage List for England
- Historic England, "No. 2 Lower Hyde Green (Lower Hyde Green Farm-house), Stalybridge (1356463)", National Heritage List for England
- Historic England, "Nos. 4 and 6 School Lane, Stalybridge (1068018)", National Heritage List for England
- Historic England, "The Fold House, Stalybridge (1309339)", National Heritage List for England
- Historic England, "Stocks, Stalybridge (1163064)", National Heritage List for England
- Historic England, "Stable wing adjoining the north-east of Moorgate House, Stalybridge (1068019)", National Heritage List for England
- Historic England, "Nos. 4 and 5 Lower Hyde Green and adjoining farm buildings, Stalybridge (1068009)", National Heritage List for England
- Historic England, "Nos. 9, 9A, 10, 11 and 12 School Lane, Stalybridge (1309334)", National Heritage List for England
- Historic England, "Stamford Arms, Stalybridge (1068012)", National Heritage List for England
- Historic England, "Sun Green and Sun Green Farmhouse, Stalybridge (1356464)", National Heritage List for England
- Historic England, "Nos. 113 and 115 Mottram Old Road, Stalybridge (1163036)", National Heritage List for England
- Historic England, "Barn range to south of Staley Hall, Stalybridge (1068015)", National Heritage List for England
- Historic England, "Barn range to southeast of Staley Hall, Stalybridge (1163033)", National Heritage List for England
- Historic England, "Nos. 176, 178 and 180 Mottram Old Road, Stalybridge (1356469)", National Heritage List for England
- Historic England, "No. 154 Mottram Old Road, Stalybridge (1163043)", National Heritage List for England
- Historic England, "Nos. 574 and 576 Huddersfield Road, Stalybridge (1356466)", National Heritage List for England
- Historic England, "Cote Farmhouse, Stalybridge (1068010)", National Heritage List for England
- Historic England, "Nos. 5 and 6 Sun Green, Stalybridge (1162951)", National Heritage List for England
- Historic England, "Holly Cottage, Stalybridge (1309347)", National Heritage List for England
- Historic England, "Higher Croft, Stalybridge (1068011)", National Heritage List for England
- Historic England, "Moorfield House, Stalybridge (1356467)", National Heritage List for England
- Historic England, "The Cottage and Tonge Green House, Stalybridge (1309354)", National Heritage List for England
- Historic England, "Nos. 14, 16 and 18 John Street, Stalybridge (1163008)", National Heritage List for England
- Historic England, "Old cross, Stalybridge (1068020)", National Heritage List for England
- Historic England, "Huddersfield Narrow Canal Milestone set in boundary wall at SJ 968 988, Stalybridge (1261184)", National Heritage List for England
- Historic England, "Huddersfield Narrow Canal Stakes Aqueduct and tow-path bridge (Aqueduct Bridge) over River Tame, Stalybridge (1356465)", National Heritage List for England
- Historic England, "Toll bar Cottage, Stalybridge (1067986)", National Heritage List for England
- Historic England, "Castle Street Mills, Stalybridge (1338882)", National Heritage List for England
- Historic England, "West Hill High School for boys, Stalybridge (1068021)", National Heritage List for England
- Historic England, "Nos. 18, 20 and 22 Portland Place, Stalybridge (1346235)", National Heritage List for England
- Historic England, "Former Corn Mill Buildings, Stalybridge (1240049)", National Heritage List for England
- Historic England, "Copley Mills, Stalybridge (1162996)", National Heritage List for England
- Historic England, "Bankwood Mill, Stalybridge (1268031)", National Heritage List for England
- Historic England, "Former Stalybridge Town Hall (1067987)", National Heritage List for England
- Historic England, "Roman Catholic Church of St Peter, Stalybridge (1413252)", National Heritage List for England
- Historic England, "Church of St. George, Stalybridge (1162957)", National Heritage List for England
- Historic England, "Church of St. Paul, Stalybridge (1068013)", National Heritage List for England
- Historic England, "St. Paul's Church of England Primary School, Stalybridge (1309374)", National Heritage List for England
- Historic England, "Heyrod Bridge, Stalybridge (1449241)", National Heritage List for England
- Historic England, "Heyrod Hall Bridge, Stalybridge (1449242)", National Heritage List for England
- Historic England, "Holy Trinity Church, Stalybridge (1068022)", National Heritage List for England
- Historic England, "Oakwood Mill, Stalybridge (1084302)", National Heritage List for England
- Historic England, "Church of St. James, Stalybridge (1162989)", National Heritage List for England
- Historic England, "Victoria Market, Stalybridge (1068023)", National Heritage List for England
- Historic England, "Victoria Bridge, Stalybridge (1356470)", National Heritage List for England
- Historic England, "Stalybridge Public Library (1356492)", National Heritage List for England
- Historic England, "Post Office, Stalybridge (1389352)", National Heritage List for England
- Historic England, "Thorn House, Stalybridge (1240077)", National Heritage List for England
- Historic England, "Former Sunday School, Stalybridge (1261179)", National Heritage List for England
- Historic England, "War memorial, Stalybridge (1163074)", National Heritage List for England
- Historic England, "Church of St Raphael the Archangel, Stalybridge (1406451)", National Heritage List for England
- Historic England, Listed Buildings
- Hartwell, Clare; Hyde, Matthew; Hubbard, Edward; Pevsner, Nikolaus (2011) [1971], Cheshire, The Buildings of England, Yale University Press, ISBN 978-0-300-17043-6
