= Northern Roots =

Urban farm and eco-park in Oldham, Greater Manchester, England

- Interactive map of Northern Roots
- Type: Urban farm and eco-park
- Location: Kings Road, Oldham, Greater Manchester, England
- Coordinates: 53.5307°N 2.1017°W
- Area: 160 acres (65 ha)
- Opened: 2026; 0 years ago
- Owner: Oldham Council
- Website: northern-roots.uk

Northern Roots is a 160-acre (65 ha) urban farm and eco‑park in Oldham, a town in Greater Manchester, England. Developed by Oldham Council and the Northern Roots charity, it occupies land south of the town centre adjoining Alexandra Park and extending into the Medlock Valley. The project combines food growing, environmental restoration, community programmes and vocational training, and opened to the public in September 2026.

== History ==
The land now occupied by Northern Roots has a long industrial past, having accommodated coal workings, cotton mills, sewage infrastructure, a landfill and sections of an industrial railway. Large areas were left contaminated or underused as Oldham's heavy industries declined.

In the late 2010s Oldham Council began reconsidering the future of the site, introducing small‑scale community‑growing projects and commissioning feasibility studies. This work led to the development of a wider masterplan with organisations including Lancashire Wildlife Trust, City of Trees, Natural England and the Greater Manchester Ecology Unit.

Planning permission for the first phase was granted in October 2022. The scheme included the Welcome Building, Forestry Skills Centre, market‑garden infrastructure, visitor facilities, and associated landscape and ecological works. Further amendments were approved in 2024 after mine shafts were discovered on part of the site, prompting changes to the layout of several buildings and revisions to parking, access and electric‑vehicle charging provision.

Funding was secured from the Towns Fund and the Levelling Up Fund, and enabling works began in 2024. Construction of the main buildings followed in 2025, with the Welcome Building and Forestry Skills Centre completed and handed over in summer 2026. Northern Roots opened to the public on 19 September 2026, and now operates several days a week as part of Oldham's wider regeneration strategy under its Mayoral Development Corporation. The site occupies a 160-acre (65 ha) area south of Oldham town centre, adjoining Alexandra Park and extending towards Bankfield Clough and the Medlock Valley.

== Site and facilities ==
Northern Roots contains a range of buildings, growing areas and landscaped spaces designed to support education, community activity and environmental restoration. The two‑storey Welcome Building acts as the principal visitor hub, housing a café, shop, production kitchen, flexible community rooms, exhibition and performance spaces, and facilities for school groups. Its café, led by Manchester chef Mary-Ellen McTague, uses produce grown on the site's urban farm.

Adjacent to the Welcome Building is the Forestry Skills Centre, which provides vocational training in land‑based industries such as woodland management, horticulture and landscape skills. Constructed from low‑carbon glulam‑timber, it forms part of the council's "Green and Growing" strategy.

The site also incorporates a multi‑acre urban farm and market garden producing organic fruit, vegetables and herbs for sale and for use in the café. Growing areas include polytunnels, raised beds, apiaries, a chicken coop, agroforestry plots, a kitchen garden and a wildflower meadow, with soil testing and remediation undertaken to ensure safe food production.

Beyond the farmed areas, Northern Roots contains woodland, grassland, heathland, wetland and freshwater habitats, including four ponds created for great crested newts. More than 2,500 trees and hedging plants have been planted, invasive species removed, and sustainable drainage systems installed to improve water quality and reduce flood risk.

Recreational features are distributed across the site and include graded walking routes, adventure play areas, mountain‑bike trails, outdoor classrooms, event spaces, and an amphitheatre. These facilities support a year‑round programme of festivals, performances, workshops and family activities.

== Community engagement ==
Northern Roots operates a community‑led model offering paid one‑day‑a‑week roles for local residents, including Citizen Rangers, Heritage Champions, Young Producers and Community Champions. Participants have taken part in arts, nature and heritage activities, and many have been supported through nature‑based social‑prescribing programmes. Reported outcomes include improvements in wellbeing among people referred through local health services.

The project also provides placements for young people not in education, employment or training, care leavers, young offenders, and students from local colleges and universities. It is planned to host a year‑round programme of events, volunteering opportunities and wellbeing activities, and is expected to accommodate around 4,500 school visits annually by 2030.

== See also ==
- Brownfield land
