= St George's Church, Stalybridge =

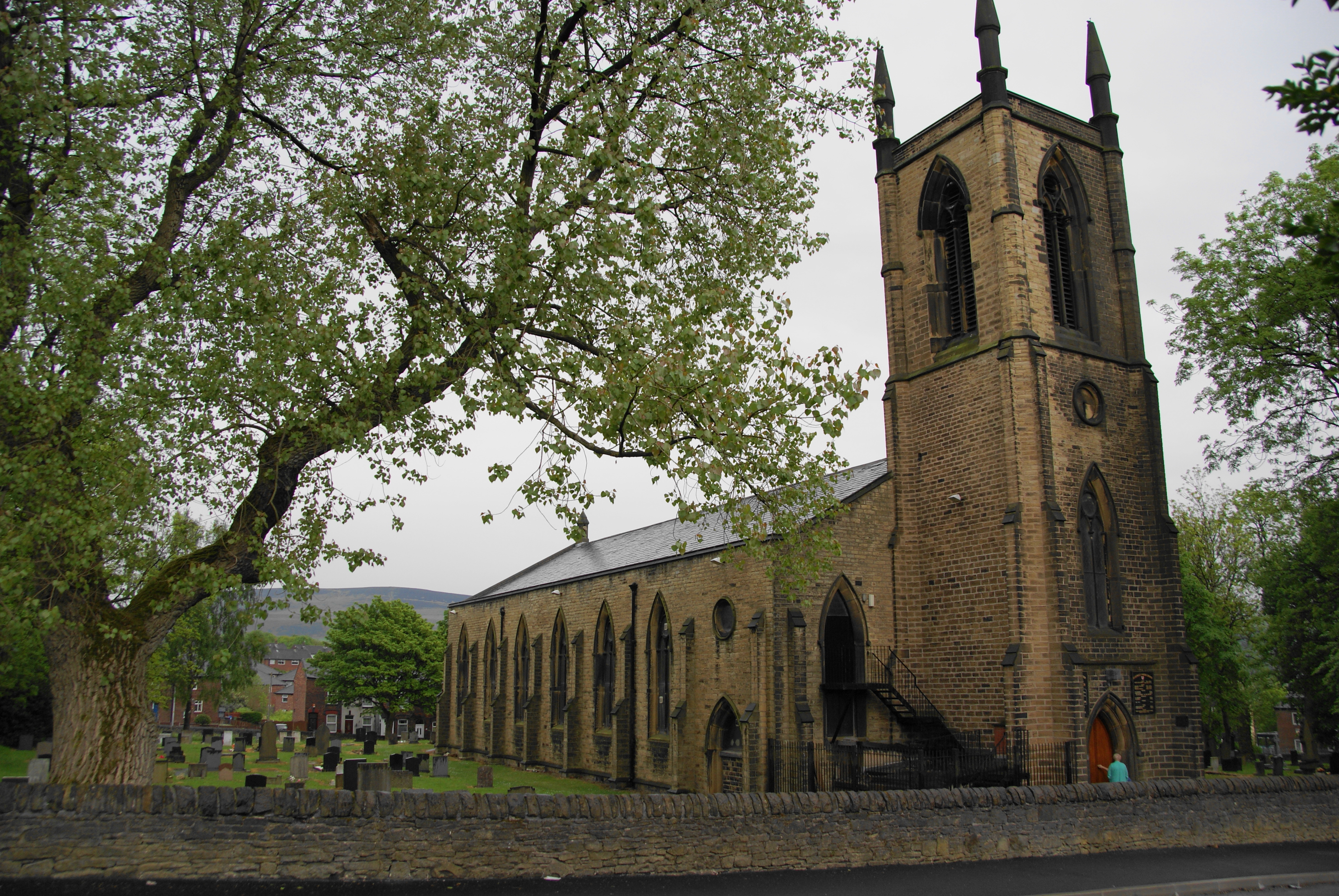
- St George's Church, Stalybridge
- St George's Church, Stalybridge
- 53.4874°N 2.0579°W
- OS grid reference: SJ 963 990
- Location: Church Walk, Stalybridge, Greater Manchester
- Country: England
- Denomination: Anglican
- Churchmanship: Liberal Catholic
- Website: St George, Stalybridge

History
- Status: Parish church
- Founded: 3 September 1838
- Dedication: Saint George
- Consecrated: 24 June 1840

Architecture
- Functional status: Active
- Heritage designation: Grade II
- Designated: 6 February 1986
- Architect: Edmund Sharpe
- Architectural type: Church
- Style: Gothic Revival
- Groundbreaking: 1838
- Completed: 1840
- Construction cost: £4,012

Specifications
- Materials: Stone, slate roof

Administration
- Province: York
- Diocese: Manchester
- Archdeaconry: Rochdale
- Deanery: Ashton-under-Lyne
- Parish: St George, Stalybridge

St George's Church is in Church Walk, Stalybridge, Greater Manchester, England. It is an active Anglican parish church in the deanery of Ashton-under-Lyne, the archdeaconry of Rochdale and the diocese of Manchester. The church is recorded in the National Heritage List for England as a designated Grade II listed building. It was a Commissioners' church, having received a grant towards its construction from the Church Building Commission.

== History ==
Since 1776 there has been a chapel of ease dedicated to Saint George on the north bank of the River Tame overlooking its main crossing point. This replaced an earlier chapel of ease that had been damaged by a landslip in 1774. In the early part of the 19th century the fabric of the church had deteriorated and it was considered to be unsafe. In 1835 the incumbent approached Lord Stamford, the patron of the living, to provide land for a new church on a different site. Land was found for this about 0.25 miles (0.4 km) to the northwest.

The foundation stone was laid on 3 September 1838, the same day as the foundation stone for Sharpe's St John's Church at Dukinfield, by Lord Viscount Combermere, a former Grand Master of the local Masonic Lodge. It was consecrated on 24 June 1840 by the Bishop of Chester. The new church was also dedicated to Saint George. It was a Commissioners' church designed by the Lancaster architect Edmund Sharpe. It cost £4,012 (equivalent to £350,000 in 2025) to build and £2,712 of this was met by a grant from the Church Building Commission. The church provided seating for 1,022 people.

However the congregation of the old St George's Church did not want to leave their building for the new church, and successfully petitioned for the old church to be retained rather than demolished. It re-opened on 29 September 1843 with a new incumbent, separate from that of the new church. Nonetheless, there was serious tension between the two churches, which was not resolved until the incumbent of the new church died suddenly in 1847.

In 1881 the north and south galleries were removed from the church. The west gallery was not removed until 1976 when the interior of the church was divided by a brick wall. The portion to the east of the wall continued in use as a church, and the portion to the west was modified "for parochial, social, educational, and recreational facilities".

== Architecture ==
The church is built in stone with a slate roof. Its plan consists of a seven-bay nave with north and south aisles under one roof, a small single-bay chancel and a west tower. The tower is in three stages with corner buttresses rising to pinnacles. The windows are thin lancet windows, containing Geometrical tracery. The east window consists of two pairs of lancet windows, each surmounted by a round window, with another round window above them. The interior of the church has been divided. The arcades are carried on octagonal piers. The alabaster font is in the form of an angel holding a shell. The stained glass is by Lightfoot. The three-manual organ was built by Renn & Wadsworth.

== See also ==
- Listed buildings in Stalybridge
- List of architectural works by Edmund Sharpe
- List of Commissioners' churches in Northeast and Northwest England
