= Stayley Hall =

Listed building in Greater Manchester, England

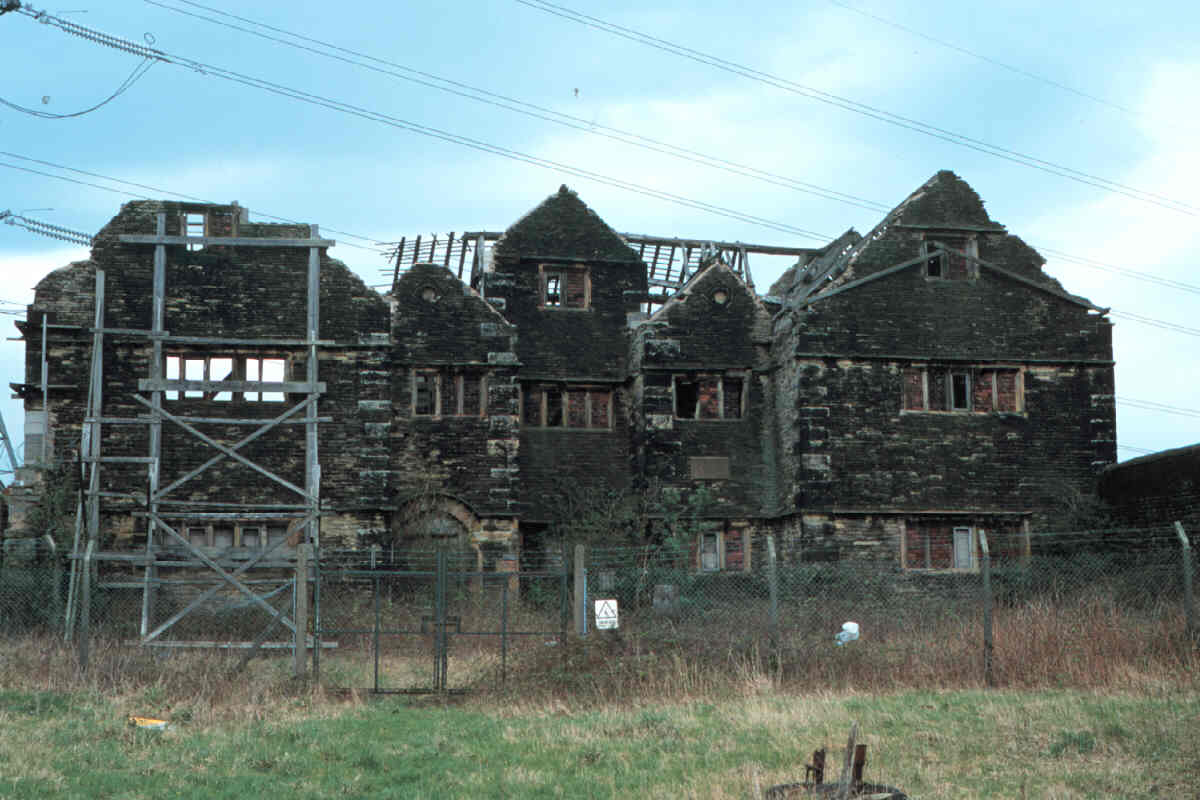
- Stayley Hall in 2008

- Location within Greater Manchester

General information
- Location: Stalybridge, Greater Manchester, England
- Coordinates: 53.4941°N 2.0380°W

Design and construction
- Designations

Listed Building – Grade II*
- Official name: Staley Hall
- Designated: 8 August 1966
- Reference no.: 1163021

Stayley Hall, also known as Staley Hall, is a Grade II* listed building in Stalybridge, a town in Tameside, Greater Manchester, England.

== History ==
The structure dates back to at least the early 15th century. The first records of the de Stavelegh family as Lords of the Manor of Staley date from the early 13th century. Stayley Hall was their residence.

The hall is referred to in the diaries of Sir Ralph Staley (Stavelegh) in the early 15th century. The hall was originally timber framed, but was stone-clad during the 17th century. It is situated on a knoll, making defence of the building a relatively easy affair. The external walls and the roofing slabs are made from locally quarried gritstone. The inside of the building has been altered as parts of it were let as cottage tenements and the plaster has fallen off showing the original lattices of wicker work and clay daub. Part of the staircase still remained in 1871, although the floor was dilapidated even then.

Sir Ralph Staley had no male heirs and after his death his daughter, Elizabeth Staley, married Sir Thomas Assheton, uniting the manors of Ashton and Staley. Elizabeth and Thomas had no sons. Margaret, the eldest of their two daughters married Sir William Booth of Dunham Massey. The younger daughter Elizabeth was widowed and without children. She continued to live at Stayley Hall until her death in 1553. In her will she left her share of the lordships of Ashton and Staley to the Booths.

The hall remained in the possession of the Booth family until the death of George Booth, 2nd Earl of Warrington on 2 August 1758. Upon his death, the Earldom of Warrington became extinct. His only daughter, Lady Mary Booth, who was the wife of Harry Grey, 4th Earl of Stamford, inherited all the Booth estates. The hall was then owned by the Grey family until the extinction of the Earldom of Stamford on the death of Roger Grey, 10th Earl of Stamford in 1976.

John Wesley visited Stayley Hall in 1745 and a commemorative stone tablet was placed on the hall's wall around the time of the visit.

In 2004 the Metropolitan Borough Council announced that they had granted permission to a developer to build 16 homes next to Stayley Hall. A condition of the planning consent was that the hall be restored. The developer converted the hall and outbuildings into houses and apartments, most of which are now occupied.

== See also ==
- Grade II* listed buildings in Greater Manchester
- Listed buildings in Stalybridge
