= Cotton production in Egypt =

Cotton production in Egypt was insignificant before the 1800s, but production increased drastically in the years preceding the beginning of the 20th century. The increase was influenced by historical events such as the American Civil War, which disrupted the supply of cotton from the United States. The Egyptian cotton market declined in the 20th century, but is again on the rise as of 2023.

== Rise in Cotton Production ==
=== 19th-century cotton boom ===
For Egypt, the 19th century brought drastic and sudden economic changes. The groundwork for this explosion of production had been in place for decades. Earlier, cotton production for export was present but represented an insignificant portion of revenue for the country. By the 20th century, this was completely reversed. This drastic economic change was afforded with the help of continual investment into the production and processing of cotton, enabling several infrastructure improvements. Several social movements occurred simultaneously, influenced by the continuous changing of the economic landscape.

Muhammad Ali of Egypt saw an opportunity in long-staple cotton and acted to promote its cultivation. He instituted Egypt’s tenured land system to promote production, and his foreign relations enabled the export of cotton, thus giving rise to export-oriented industrialization. He converted peasants into factory workers, using the corvee system. This feudal-like system began to face national pushback in the 1880s; a process heavily influenced by the British.

One factor that led the cotton industry to success was continuous dedication to its funding. Change is not the first example of federal investment in cotton. Previously, the Egyptian government had funded research in cotton production. The research resulted in an improved cotton plant that was nearly unrivaled.

Several infrastructure projects were taken on by the government throughout the entirety of the 1800s. These projects focused on both production and processing of cotton. Production and agricultural improvements included canal and dam construction. The canals, as well as several newly built railways, enabled greater national travel. Other projects included the development of several ports and communication improvements. The new infrastructure played a key role in the “boom” of the Egyptian cotton industry.

The American Civil war began in 1861. The Egyptian cotton market boomed to fill the sudden cotton demand from the Cotton Supply Association and its many member British factories and investors. Prior to the American Civil War, American cotton made up the overwhelming majority of cotton imported into Britain. Cotton was also imported from India, but Indian cotton was of inferior quality when compared with American cotton. Demand for cotton increased steadily during the latter half of the century propelled by the ongoing “Cotton Famine.” Egypt took advantage of this. During the three-year period between 1861 and 1864, Egypt ceased nearly all agricultural activity unrelated to cotton.

=== 1900s cotton market decline ===
The decline of Egypt’s Cotton Market and foreign trade created an economic crisis brought by a drop in demand. Some of the contributing factors included increased competition, production issues and national debt. More foreign competition in the cotton industry plateaued international cotton prices, leaving the Egyptian market with little room to grow. Egypt’s agricultural production had swelled at an incredible rate and kept up with itself until the early 1900s. In the early 1900s, environmental and human factors both lowered production rates. After the prior “boom” of the cotton industry, the population began to increase quickly and consistently. The economy did not follow suit. Earlier expansions done to increase cotton production were costly, and the accumulated cost of these projects created high amounts of national debt. In 1914, Egypt’s debt added up to over one hundred million pounds.

== Current production ==
The United States Department of Agriculture notes that cotton production is on the rise in Egypt, with 2023 production estimates to be at 320,000 bales.
