= Millbrook, Greater Manchester =

Coordinates: 53.493°N 2.034°W

Millbrook
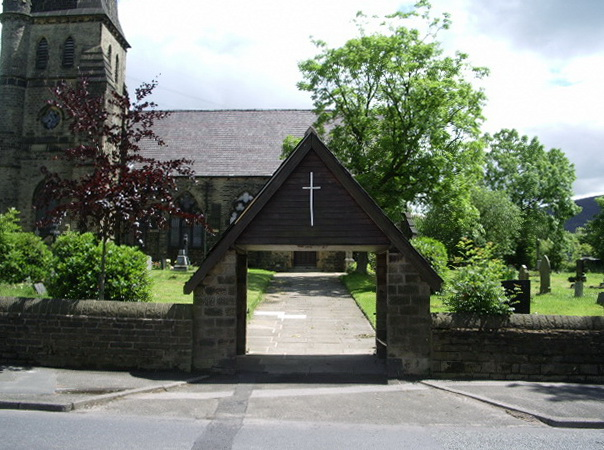
- St James' Church, Millbrook

- Location within Greater Manchester
- OS grid reference: SJ977996
- Metropolitan borough: Tameside
- Metropolitan county: Greater Manchester
- Region: North West
- Country: England
- Sovereign state: United Kingdom
- Post town: STALYBRIDGE
- Postcode district: SK15
- Dialling code: 0161
- Police: Greater Manchester
- Fire: Greater Manchester
- Ambulance: North West
- UK Parliament: Stalybridge and Hyde

Millbrook is a village near Stalybridge, northwest England. It is part of the Stalybridge South ward of Tameside metropolitan borough. It also played a huge part of the industrial revolution, as the name suggests, several cotton mills once existed, in and around the village, Bottomleys mill was in one of the first ever steam driven mills.

Millbrook suffered from the Storm Angus, 21 Nov 2016 when 3 inches (7.6 cm) of rain fell on Tameside in five hours.

== History ==
Like most of Stalybridge, Millbrook lies within the historic county boundaries of Cheshire. Having previously been part of the Staley Local Board, it was included in the municipal borough of Stalybridge in 1881. The whole borough became part of the administrative county of Cheshire in 1888. Since 1974 Stalybridge has been in the metropolitan county of Greater Manchester.

== See also ==
- Listed buildings in Stalybridge
