= Stamford Arms =

Listed pub in Carrbrook, Greater Manchester, England

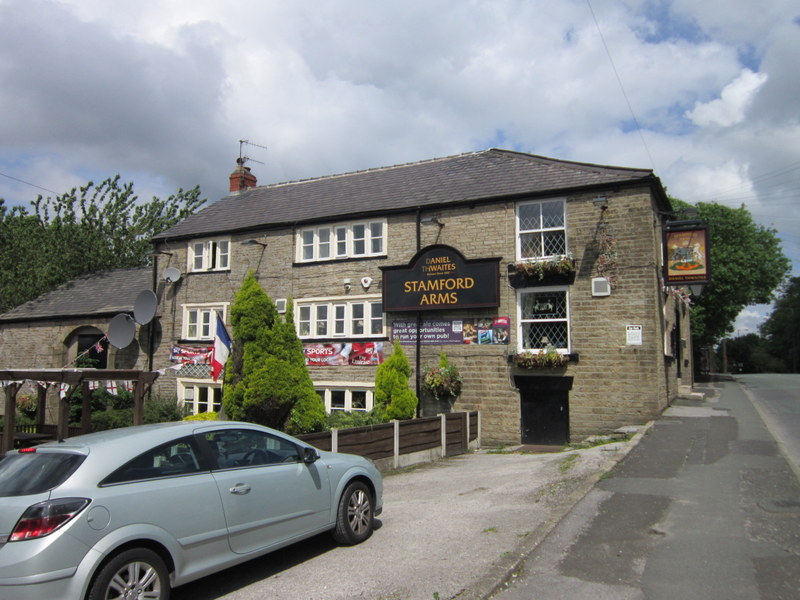
- The pub in 2012

- Location within Greater Manchester

General information
- Type: Public house
- Location: 815 Huddersfield Road, Carrbrook, Greater Manchester, England
- Coordinates: 53.5090°N 2.0284°W
- Year built: Mid-18th century
- Renovated: 19th century (added)
- Owner: Thwaites

Design and construction
- Designations

Listed Building – Grade II
- Official name: Stamford Arms
- Designated: 6 February 1986
- Reference no.: 1068012

Website
- stamfordarmsstalybridge.co.uk

The Stamford Arms is a Grade II listed public house on Huddersfield Road in Carrbrook, a village east of Stalybridge in Tameside, Greater Manchester, England. Built in the mid-18th century and extended in the 19th century, it is shown as the Stamford Arms pub on the 1875 and 1935 Ordnance Survey maps. As of 2026, its freehold is owned by Thwaites Brewery.

== History ==
The building was constructed in the mid-18th century, according to its official listing, with additions made in the 19th century. The 1875 and 1935 Ordnance Survey maps mark the building as the Stamford Arms public house.

On 6 February 1986, the Stamford Arms was designated a Grade II listed building. As of 2026, the pub's freehold is owned by Thwaites Brewery.

== Architecture ==
=== Exterior ===
The building is constructed of stone with a slate roof and a brick chimney. It has three storeys, arranged in two bays and set out in a double-depth plan, with a former barn attached on the left and a 19th‑century single‑bay addition on the right. There are lean‑to structures at the rear and a small brick extension.

The original part of the house has a central doorway and multi‑paned stone‑framed windows on each floor, set back slightly on the lower two levels. The barn includes a former cart entrance with a curved head and another doorway beside it, both now filled in. A later two‑bay frontage for pub use was added on the right, with a central door, four windows with simple stone details and modern frames, and a hipped roof.

=== Interior ===
The main bar has low ceilings with exposed beams. At the front, the windows contain stained glass showing the Stamford family arms, while the lower windows at the back reflect the style of older buildings in the area. What were once two separate front rooms have been combined to form a single, larger bar space.

== See also ==
- Listed buildings in Stalybridge
- Listed pubs in Greater Manchester
