= Jane Walsh =

English textile worker and writer (born c. 1905)

Jane Walsh was an English textile worker and writer. She was born c. 1905 in the slums of Oldham northern England. Walsh lived through the hard times of depression, mass unemployment, and suffering of '20 and '30. Her husband Charlie worked as well in the textile industry. She was left a widow at the age of 40, after many years of living with her husband and their three children, the youngest of whom was crippled by polio.

Though being a classic representative of the working class, Walsh didn't manage to connect herself with the syndicalist movevement of that time, which were very active especially near Lancashire textile areas.

In 1953 her autobiography, Not Like This, was published.

== Bibliography ==
- Not Like This (1953), published by Lawrence & Wishart Ltd, London

== Sources ==
- News Statesman, 1953, review
- Blogcritics, review, 2011
