= Arthur Hutchinson (footballer) =

Australian rules footballer, born 1903

Personal information
- Full name: Arthur Hutchinson
- Born: 24 March 1903
- Died: 13 October 1951 (aged 48)

Playing career^{1}
Years	Club	Games (Goals)
1926	North Melbourne	4 (2)
- ^{1} Playing statistics correct to the end of 1926.

Arthur Hutchinson (24 March 1903 – 13 October 1951) was an Australian rules footballer who played for the North Melbourne Football Club in the Victorian Football League (VFL).
