= Arthur Hutchinson (dentist) =

British professor of dentistry

- Born: 26 July 1889; Oldham, England
- Died: 16 December 1969 (aged 80); Edinburgh, Scotland
- Occupation: Dentist

Arthur Cyril William Hutchinson FRSE (26 July 1889 – 16 December 1969) was a British professor of dentistry.

== Life ==
Hutchinson was born in Oldham, England on 26 July 1889, the son of Reverend William Roberts Hutchinson. He was raised in Oldham and educated at Oundle School. He studied dentistry at the University of Manchester, graduating with a BDS in 1911.

In 1935, he was elected an Honorary Fellow of the Royal Society of Edinburgh. His proposers were Sir Sydney Alfred Smith, James Couper Brash, Alexander Murray Drennan, Alfred Joseph Clark and Thomas Johnson.

From 1951 to 1958, he was Professor of Dental Surgery at the University of Edinburgh, and in later life was awarded honorary doctorates (DDS) from both the University of Edinburgh and the University of the Witwatersrand.

He died in Edinburgh, Scotland on 16 December 1969.

== Publications ==
- Dental and Oral X-ray Diagnosis (1954)

== Family ==
In 1918, he married Dorothy Mary Orme.
