= Lancashire Cotton Famine =

Depression in the textile industry of North West England

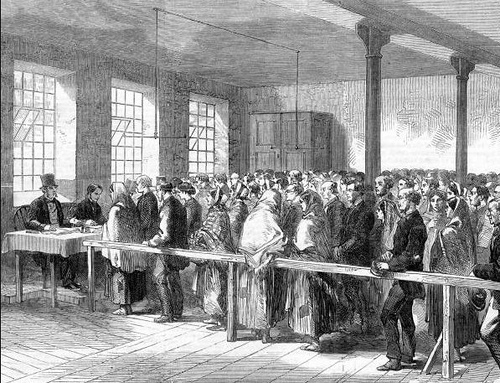
An 1862 newspaper illustration showing people queueing for food and coal tickets at a district Provident Society office

The Lancashire Cotton Famine, also known as the Cotton Famine or the Cotton Panic (1861–1865), was a depression in the textile industry of North West England, brought about by overproduction in a time of contracting world markets. It coincided with the interruption of baled cotton imports caused by the American Civil War and speculators buying up new stock for storage in the shipping warehouses at the entrepôt. It also caused cotton prices to rise in China, in which trade had been steadily increasing following the Second Opium War and during the ongoing Taiping Rebellion. The increase in cotton prices caused the textile trade to rapidly lose two-thirds of its previous value of exports to China from 1861 to 1862. The worldwide cotton famine also produced a boom in cotton production in Egypt and Russian Turkestan.

The boom years of 1859 and 1860 had produced more woven cotton than could be sold and a cutback in production was needed. The situation was exacerbated by an overabundance of raw cotton held in the warehouses and dockyards of the ports and the market was flooded with finished goods, causing the price to collapse, while at the same time the demand for raw cotton fell. The price for raw cotton increased by several hundred percent due to blockade and lack of imports. The inaccessibility of raw cotton and the difficult trading conditions caused a change in the social circumstances of the Lancashire region's extensive cotton mill workforce. Factory owners no longer bought large quantities of raw cotton to process and large parts of Lancashire and the surrounding areas' workers became unemployed and went from being the most prosperous workers in Britain to the most impoverished.

Local relief committees were set up and appealed for money locally and nationally. There were two major funds, the Manchester Central Committee and the Mansion House Committee of the Lord Mayor of London. The poorest applied for relief under the Poor Laws, through the Poor Law Unions. Local relief committees experimented with soup kitchens and direct aid. In 1862, sewing classes and industrial classes were organised by local churches and attendance merited a Poor Law payment. After the Public Works (Manufacturing Districts) Act 1864 was passed, local authorities were empowered to borrow money for approved public works. They commissioned the rebuilding of sewerage systems, cleaning rivers, landscaping parks and surfacing roads. In 1864, cotton imports were restored, the mills were put back into production but some towns had diversified and many thousands of operatives had emigrated.

== Background ==
The 1850s had been a period of unprecedented growth for the cotton industry in Lancashire, the High Peak of Derbyshire, and north east parts of Cheshire. The region had swamped the American market with printed cottons and was speculatively exporting to India. The populations of some mill towns in Lancashire and the surrounding region had almost doubled, the profit to capital ratio was running at more than 30 per cent, and a recession was looming. In 1861, the slave-owning southern states of America, where most of the world's raw cotton was produced, declared their independence and attempted to secede from the United States of America. The situation quickly deteriorated, culminating in the outbreak of the American Civil War and leading to an immediate, protracted interruption of the cotton supply – initially by a voluntary boycott by Southern planters who believed a run on the cotton would quickly debilitate the British economy and force them to intervene on the South's behalf. By the time it became clear that this strategy was ineffective, the resumption of cotton exports was prevented by the Union blockade of Southern ports.

In 1860, there were 2,650 cotton mills in the region, employing 440,000 people who were paid in total £11,500,000 per annum, of whom 90 per cent were adults and 56 per cent female. The mills used 300,000 hp (220,000 kW), of which 18,500 (13,800 kW, 6.17 per cent) was generated by water power. The mills had 30.4 million spindles and 350,000 power looms. The industry imported 1,390,938,752 lb (620,954.800 long tons; 630,919.205 t) of raw cotton a year. It exported 2.78 billion yards of cotton cloth and 197,343,655 lb (88,099.846 long tons; 89,513.576 t) of twist and yarn. The total value of its exports was £32 million.

	Lancashire	Cheshire	Derbyshire
Mills	1,920	200	25
Workers	310,000	38,000	12,000

Country	Imports (lb) (Note: Of the 1,390,938,752 lb of raw cotton 1,115,890,608 lb came from America.(80 per cent). At the end of 1860, there remained 250 million lb in storage in the United Kingdom.)
America	1,115,890,608
East Indies	204,141,168
West Indies	1,630,784
Brazil	17,286,864
Other	52,569,328

== First year ==
Unsold cloth had been building up in the warehouses in Bombay (Mumbai); production had exceeded demand and short time working was inevitable. As indications came that trouble was possible, the American growers hurried to export their crop early. Almost enough of the 1861 crop reached Liverpool to supply the mills. Middling Orleans, the type of cotton that was used to gauge the prices, was selling for 7 3/4d a pound in June 1861.

It was initially believed that British warehoused stocks of cotton would be adequate to see out the anticipated brief conflict. As all the Union advances early on were driven back, it became clear to European observers that the war would not be over quickly. By December, Middling Orleans was selling at 11 3/4d/lb. The merchants were holding onto their cotton, speculating on a price rise. By the beginning of 1862, mills were being closed and workers laid off; one-third of the families in one Lancashire cotton town were in receipt of relief. The price of Middling Orleans, which had been produced at a cost of 3 3/4d and bought by the merchants for 8d in 1861, rose to 2s. 3d. (27d) by October 1862, and to 2s. 5d. (29d) the following year. It is calculated that the merchants had a windfall of £35 million.

== Surat ==
Sea Island (also known as extra long staple), grown on the islands off the Carolina coast of America, was the best quality cotton; Egyptian — the name given to Sea Island cotton that had been introduced into Egypt — was the second best grade. The most common grades were the short staple Gossypium hirsutum (American upland) cottons which included Middling Orleans; it was these grades that were used by the majority of Lancashire's calico producers. The Surat cottons from India were the least suitable for machinery and were only ever used as a small percentage of a mixture as the fibres were short and broke easily. Surat came in smaller bales which contained stones and other impurities. Each town in Lancashire used different mixtures and when the supply of American and Sea Island Cotton dried up, the mill owners moved over to Surat. Some machines could be adjusted to take it but extra humidity was needed to reduce breakages. Running a loom on Surat could only produce about 40 per cent of the previous throughput and, as workers were paid by the piece, their income was slashed.

Mill owners were also in difficulty as many of the smaller family-owned mills were mortgaged and if they stopped running the owners would fall behind with payments. Shopkeepers had no sales and could not afford the rents, workers defaulted on their rents and the landlord who stood the loss was often the mill owner. The wealthier mill owners such as Henry Houldsworth, were confident that the famine was temporary and planned for the new more efficient larger machinery that was becoming available, it was during the famine (1863–65) that he built Houldsworth Mill, Reddish, the first of the next generation of larger mills and at the time the world's largest mill with 138,000 spindles. With most raw cotton unavailable, mill owners had to either close mills and attempt to help the workers financially, use inferior cotton or bring new cotton into production. Surat was available but mainly used internally in British India. Some limited increase in production was achieved. Attempts were made to establish Sea Island in Queensland and New Zealand and to grow short staple near Mumbai.

== Suffering ==
The cotton industry had become highly specialised by the 1860s and the severity of the famine in different towns depended on many factors. Some towns were built around mills using short fibre American cotton, while others used the longer fibre Egyptian cotton still available. Some mills had mules that could be adjusted to use a different cotton, while others did not. Owners of "integrateds" (mills that both spun and wove) could better balance the workload, thus preserving the precious raw material for longer. Some cautious mill owners always held stock in hand, while others bought as required.

The older paternalistic mill owners who lived among the local community were quick to divert their neighbours and workforce to maintenance work at their own expense. For example, in Glossop, Lord Howard called a family meeting of mill owners, clergy and "respectable" residents to take charge of the situation. Two relief committees were formed which experimented unsuccessfully with soup kitchens then set about distributing thousands of pounds worth of provisions, coal, clogs and clothing. Calico printer Edmund Potter loaned money to his workers and Howard took on extra workers on his estate. They set up schools, provided free brass band concerts, gave public readings from the Pickwick Papers and after the enactment of 1864 Public Works Act, took a loan to extend the waterworks. The only recorded tension was when the Relief Committee mistakenly decided to auction, instead of distributing free, a gift of food from the American federal government.

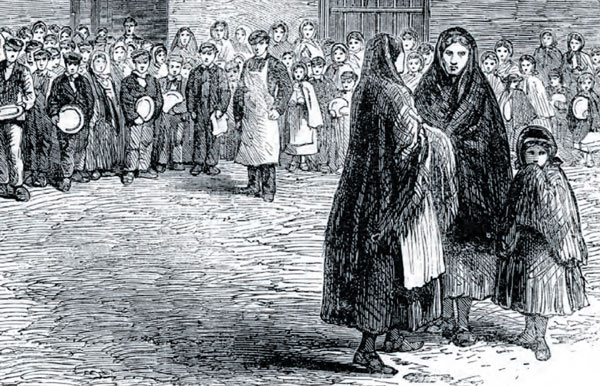
Image of the Cotton Famine from The Illustrated London News

Towns with room and power mills and a strong co-operative tradition were quick to mitigate the social damage. The firms using them would rent the space and buy the machines on credit; cotton was cheap and the profit from the cloth was used to pay off the loan and provide a return for the risk. When cotton was unavailable they were the first to go bankrupt. After the famine the need was for more advanced machines and bigger mills. The investment required was too much for many private mill owners, and limited companies built the new larger mills. Limited companies developed fastest in the areas with a room and power tradition. Municipal authorities did not have the legal power to borrow money to finance public works until the 1864 Act; before this they had to use their own reserves, which varied from town to town.

== Panic ==
Some workers left Lancashire to work in the Yorkshire woollen and worsted industries. A small number of mills such as Crimble Mill, Heywood converted to woollen production buying in second hand fulling stocks, carding equipment, mules and looms. The towns of Stockport, Denton and Hyde diversified into hat making. Tameside was the worst affected district and suffered a net loss of population between 1861 and 1871. In 1864 there were 2,000 empty houses in Stockport and 686 in Glossop, along with 65 empty shops and fifteen empty beer houses. The exodus was caused primarily by evictions. The spring saw a wave of emigration stimulated by special agencies. The steamship companies cut their rates (steerage to New York cost £3 15s 6d), the Australian and New Zealand governments offered free passage, and 1,000 people had emigrated by August 1864, 200 of them from Glossop.

== Relief effort ==
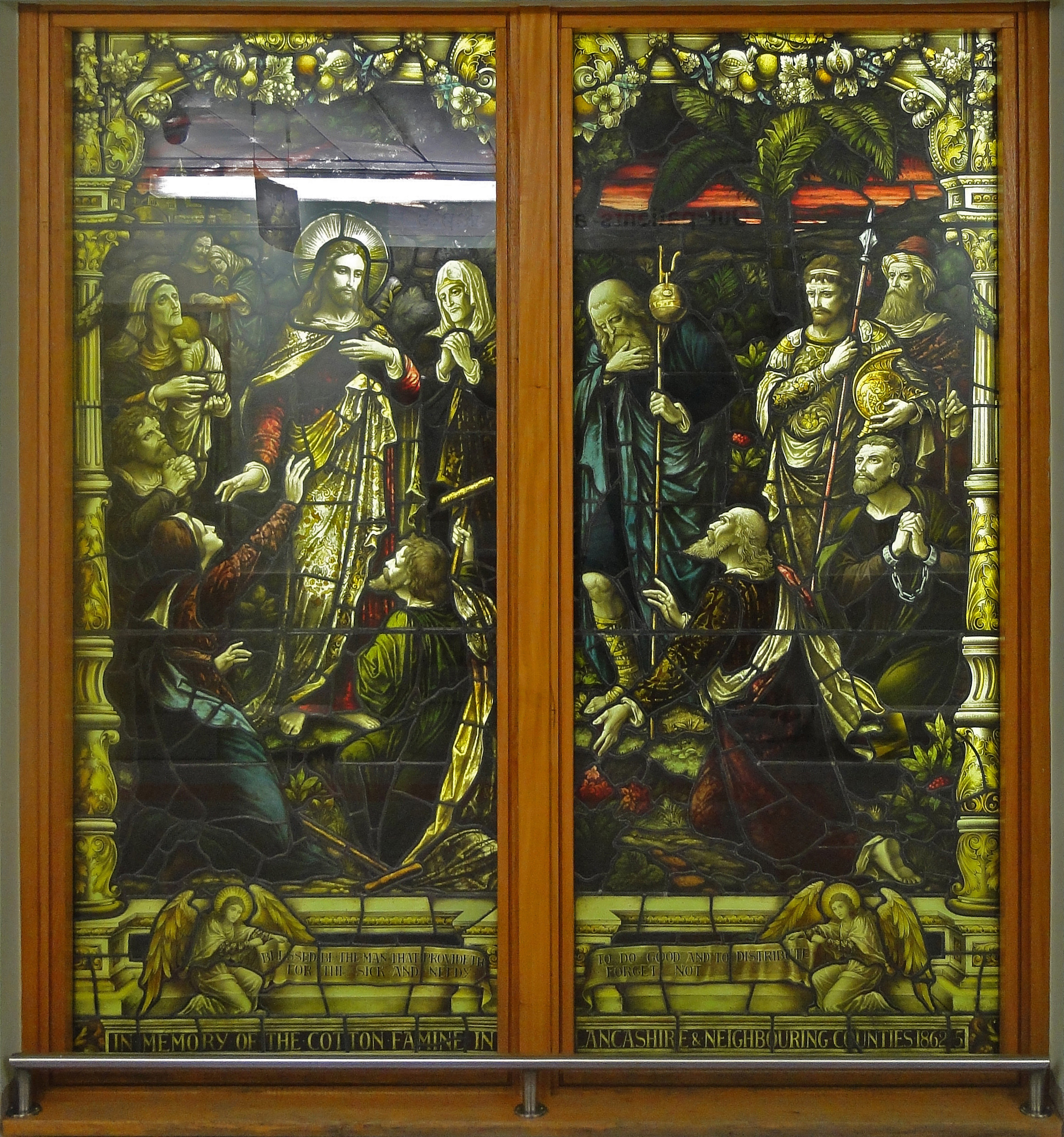
Commemorative stained-glass window preserved at North Manchester General Hospital, originally commissioned for the Cotton Districts convalescent home, Southport, in 1896

Relief in times of hardship was governed by the Poor Relief Act 1601, which required Poor Law Guardians to find work for the fit. In rural communities this was stone breaking in the quarries, the mines etc. Outdoor work was quite unsuitable for men who had been working in the humid, heated mills, whose lungs had been damaged by cotton dust. The act only required that men be set to work as long as he continued to receive relief.

The Poor Law Amendment Act 1834 had required parishes to come together to form Poor Law Unions to administer the relief. Their job was to minimise the cost to the parishes, which were compelled to finance their own poor. Paupers should be returned to their parishes of origin. Charles Pelham Villiers MP, the Poor Law Commissioner who represented an industrial constituency, wrote to the Poor Law Unions in September 1861 warning them of potential famine and instructing them to fulfil their duties with Compassion. Money had to be raised locally on the parish rates. H. B. Farnell, was appointed by Parliament to investigate the effects in Lancashire, where he started in May 1862 in Preston. He laid down a liberal interpretation of the Act and instructed gifts from charity should not be taken into account when assessing need. As an alternative to outdoor work, sewing classes were run by the churches which entitled the participants or "scholars" to receive benefit. Bible Reading classes followed and then industrial classes which taught reading, writing and simple maths with carpentry, shoemaking and tailoring. The Poor Law Unions were limited in the monies they could raise through rates and had no powers to borrow. Parliament passed the Union Relief Aid Act 1862 which allowed the burden be shared between the parishes and the county and then Public Works (Manufacturing Districts) Act 1864 authorised borrowing.

All those in work were encouraged to subscribe to charity and lists of subscribers were published. Local relief committees were set up to administer these funds, receiving other donations from the Mansion House Committee of London and Central Relief Committee of Manchester. The Mansion House Fund, more properly named the Lancashire and Cheshire Operatives Relief Fund, was set up on 16 May 1862, when £1,500 (equivalent to about £150,000 in 2023) was sent to the distressed districts. Benefactors all over the United Kingdom, the Empire and across the world, raised money for the appeal. Between April 1862 and April 1863, £473,749 was collected and distributed (about £49.3 million in 2023). The Central Committee was formed 20 June 1862, composed of mayors of the affected towns; it put out an appeal letter to other towns across the country. A third fund, set up in June 1862 for slightly different purposes, was the Cotton Districts Relief Fund, which became part of the Central Committee.

== Stalybridge Riot ==
By the winter of 1862–1863 there were 7,000 unemployed operatives in Stalybridge, one of the worst affected towns. Only five of the town's 39 factories and 24 machine shops were employing people full-time. Contributions were sent from all over the world for the relief of the cotton operatives in Cheshire and Lancashire and at one point three-quarters of Stalybridge workers were dependent on relief schemes. By 1863 there were 750 empty houses in the town. A thousand skilled men and women left the town in what became known as "The Panic". In 1863 the local relief committee decided to substitute a system of relief by ticket instead of money. The tickets were to be presented at the shops of local grocers. On Thursday 19 March a public meeting resolved to resist the tickets. On Friday 20 March 1863, the officials of the relief committee went to the thirteen schools to offer the tickets, the men refused the tickets and turned out onto the streets. They stoned the cab of the departing official and then broke the windows of the shops owned by members of the relief committee, then turned to the depots of the relief committee which they sacked. By evening, a company of Hussars came from Manchester; the Riot Act was read and eighty men were arrested; women and girls continued to harangue the police and soldiers.

On Saturday 21 March, the magistrates released most of the prisoners but committed 28 for trial in Chester. They were taken to the railway station by police and soldiers, who were pelted with stones. A further public meeting demanded "money and bread" not "tickets". Rioters demanded bread at various shops and in each case it was given to them. At 23:30, a company of infantry arrived and patrolled the streets with bayonets fixed. On the Sunday, supporters and visitors arrived in the town but there were no developments. On Monday 23 March the riot spread to Ashton, Hyde and Dukinfield. Schools had reopened but only 80 of the expected 1,700 students attended (agreed to be paid by ticket). Representatives were sent to the schools in the neighbouring towns to persuade the scholars to walk out but were met by soldiers. On the Tuesday the mobilisation ended, the relief committee offered to pay the outstanding tickets and to accept a delegation from the thirteen schools to discuss the matter further. The mayor offered that the MP John Cheetham would take the matter to parliament. The crowd believed that they had not lost relief and the ticket system would soon be abolished. The Stalybridge relief committee re-established authority. The Manchester Central Committee was critical of their poor management but they were being undermined by the Mansion House Fund of the Lord Mayor of London, which offered to distribute cash to scholars directly through the churches. The violence was blamed on outside agitators and the blame was put on an immigrant minority. Descriptions suggest about 3,500 participants, although there were only 1,700 scholars receiving aid.

== Public Works Manufacturing Districts Act 1864 ==
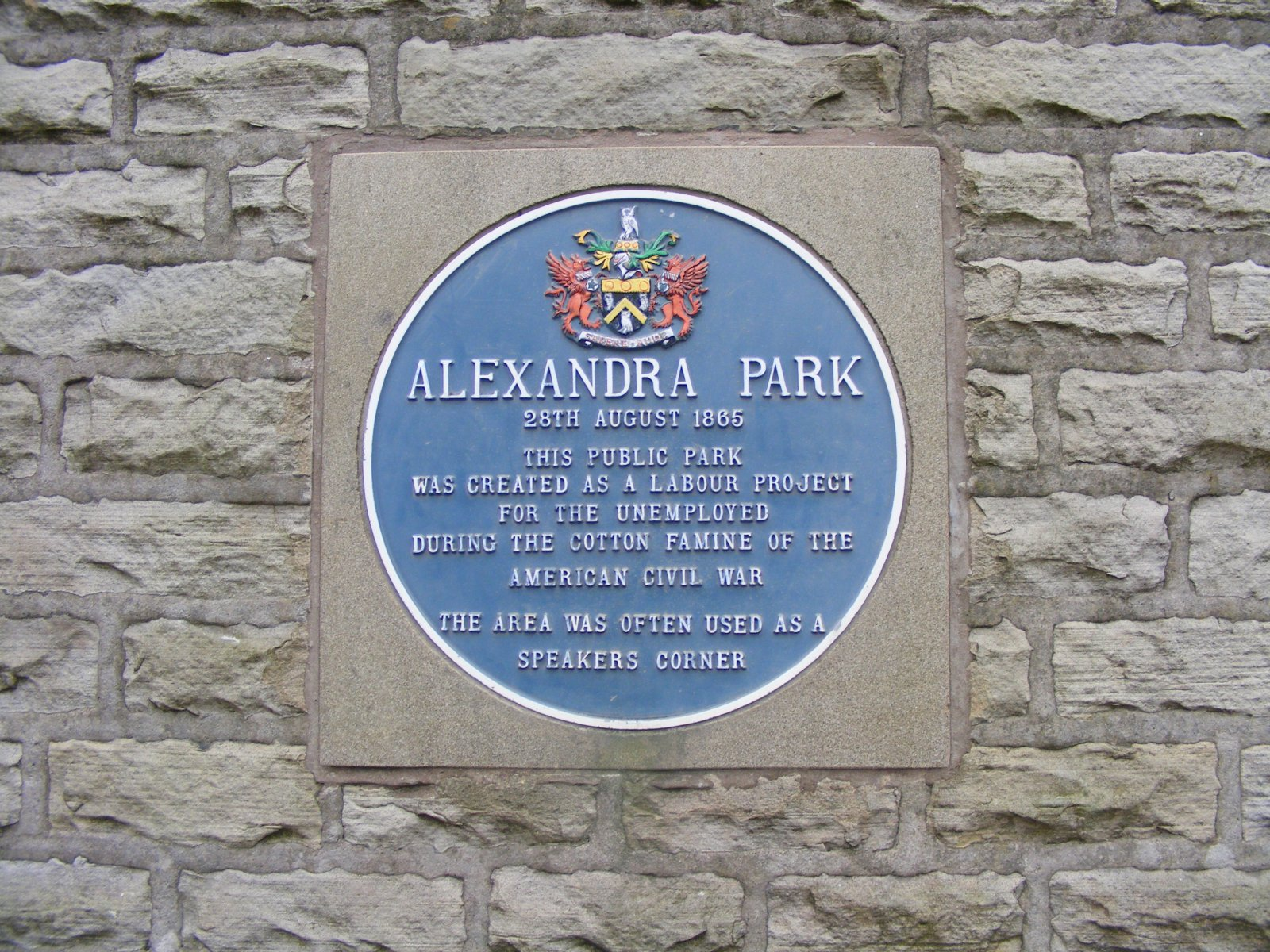
A blue plaque in Oldham's Alexandra Park, commemorating its origins.

In March 1863, there were some 60,000–70,000 women attending sewing school and 20,000 men and boys attending classes. They were defined as doing useful work so could legally receive aid under the Poor Law legislation. There remained a further 25,000 men receiving aid but not doing any work. To Victorian thinking this was wrong and some means was needed to provide paid work. Local authorities did have work that needed to be done but no legal way to borrow to pay for it. The Public Works Manufacturing Districts Act 1864 became law 2 July 1863. This allowed public authorities to borrow money for public works. Cotton operatives could now be employed on useful projects.

The Lancashire area has a legacy of municipal parks that were created in this period such as Alexandra Park, Oldham. More important were the main sewers that were commissioned to replace the collapsing medieval drains and to bring sanitation to the hundreds of mill workers' cottages that supported the mills. Canals were dug, rivers straightened and new roads constructed such as the cobbled road on Rooley Moor above Norden known as the "Cotton Famine Road". The public works commissioned in this period left a major impression on the infrastructure of the towns of Lancashire and the surrounding cotton areas.

== Cotton starts to flow ==
A trickle of raw cotton reached Lancashire in late 1863 but failed to get to the worst affected regions, being swallowed up in Manchester. The cotton was adulterated with stones but its arrival caused the principal operators to bring in key operators to prepare the mills. The American Civil War ended in April 1865. In August 1864, the first large consignment arrived and Wooley Bridge mill in Glossop reopened, giving all operatives a four and half day week. Employment then returned to normal. Raw cotton prices had risen from 6 1/2d in 1861 to 27 1/2d in 1864.

== Politics ==
The Confederacy hoped that distress in the European cotton manufacturing areas (similar hardships occurred in France), together with distaste in European ruling circles for democracy would lead to European intervention to force the Union to make peace on the basis of accepting secession of the Confederacy. After Union forces had repulsed a Confederate incursion at the Battle of Antietam in September 1862, Lincoln issued his Emancipation Proclamation. Slavery had been abolished in the British Empire by the Slavery Abolition Act 1833 three decades earlier after a long campaign. The Unionists believed that all the British public would now see this as an antislavery issue rather than an anti-protectionism issue and would pressure its government not to intervene in favour of the South. Many mill owners and workers resented the blockade and continued to see the war as an issue of tariffs against free trade. Attempts were made to run the blockade by ships from Liverpool, London and New York. 71,751 bales of American cotton reached Liverpool in 1862. Confederate flags were flown in many cotton towns.

On 31 December 1862, a meeting of cotton workers at the Free Trade Hall in Manchester, despite their increasing hardship, resolved to support the Union in its fight against slavery. An extract from the letter they wrote in the name of the Working People of Manchester to His Excellency Abraham Lincoln, President of the United States of America says:

... the vast progress which you have made in the short space of twenty months fills us with hope that every stain on your freedom will shortly be removed, and that the erasure of that foul blot on civilisation and Christianity – chattel slavery – during your presidency, will cause the name of Abraham Lincoln to be honoured and revered by posterity. We are certain that such a glorious consummation will cement Great Britain and the United States in close and enduring regards.

— Public Meeting, Free Trade Hall, Manchester, 31 December 1862.

On 19 January 1863, Abraham Lincoln sent an address thanking the cotton workers of Lancashire for their support,

... I know and deeply deplore the sufferings which the workingmen at Manchester and in all Europe are called to endure in this crisis. It has been often and studiously represented that the attempt to overthrow this government, which was built upon the foundation of human rights, and to substitute for it one which should rest exclusively on the basis of human slavery, was likely to obtain the favor of Europe. Through the actions of our disloyal citizens the workingmen of Europe have been subjected to a severe trial, for the purpose of forcing their sanction to that attempt. Under these circumstances, I cannot but regard your decisive utterance upon the question as an instance of sublime Christian heroism which has not been surpassed in any age or in any country. It is, indeed, an energetic and reinspiring assurance of the inherent power of truth and of the ultimate and universal triumph of justice, humanity, and freedom. I do not doubt that the sentiments you have expressed will be sustained by your great nation, and, on the other hand, I have no hesitation in assuring you that they will excite admiration, esteem, and the most reciprocal feelings of friendship among the American people. I hail this interchange of sentiment, therefore, as an augury that, whatever else may happen, whatever misfortune may befall your country or my own, the peace and friendship which now exist between the two nations will be, as it shall be my desire to make them, perpetual. Abraham Lincoln

— 19 January 1863

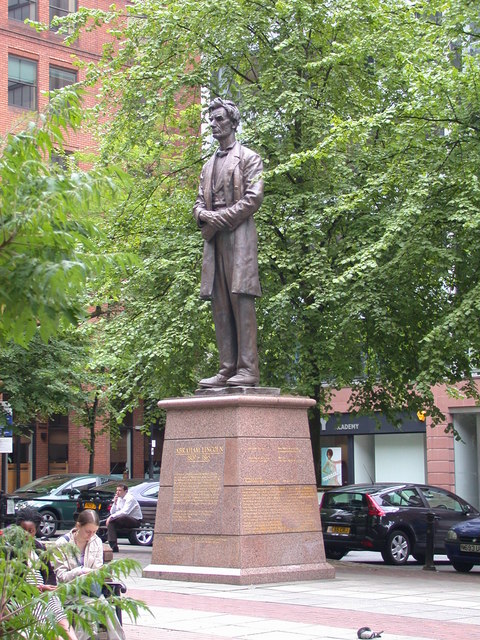
The statue of Abraham Lincoln in Manchester, England

A monument in Brazenose Street, Lincoln Square, Manchester, commemorates the events and reproduces portions of both documents. The Abraham Lincoln statue by George Grey Barnard, 1919, was formerly located in the gardens at Platt Hall in Rusholme. The Federal American government sent a gift of food to the people of Lancashire. The first consignment was sent aboard the George Griswold. Other ships were the Hope and Achilles.

== Effects in other parts of the world ==
To moderate the effects of the cotton famine, the British tried to diversify its sources of cotton by making former subsistence farmers in British India, Egypt and elsewhere grow cotton for export often at the expense of staple food production. An attempt to grow cotton was also made on the island of Sicily. With the ending of the American Civil War, these new cotton farmers became redundant and their cotton was hardly demanded. This led to their impoverishment and aggravated various famines in these countries in the second half of the 19th century.

In China, the British enjoyed an increase in trade following the results of the Second Opium War and subsequent rise of exports to China by 30 percent from year 1859–1860. But with the outbreak of the American Civil War caused disruptions driving the price of cotton "so high that the Chinese stopped buying from outside". The textile trade lost two-thirds of its value from 1861 to 1862 and kept falling.

Regions such as Australia, welcomed skilled spinners and weavers and encouraged their immigration.

== Legacy ==
In a 2015 article, economic historian Walker Hanlon finds that the cotton famine significantly affected the direction of technological progress in domains relevant to textiles manufacturing using Indian cotton, particularly for gins, openers and scutchers, and carding machines. This manifested in the major manufacturer Dobson & Barlow utilizing four different gin designs over the course of four years, as well as a 19-30 percent reduction in wasted Indian cotton over the period from 1862 to 1868. Hanlon also finds that the relative price of Indian cotton to American cotton returned to its pre-Civil War level by 1874 despite significantly increasing in abundance, which is evidence of the "strong induced-bias hypothesis" as proposed by Daron Acemoglu.

English trad-folk group Faustus released their EP "Cotton Lords" in 2019, which takes five poems from the Lancashire Cotton Famine and sets them to music by Paul Sartin.

In 2022, Folk-Revival band Bird in the Belly adapted two poems into song from the University of Exeter Cotton Famine Poetry Archive. These appear on their album After the City.

== See also ==
- King cotton
- Cotton diplomacy

== Bibliography ==
- Arnold, Sir Arthur (1864). The History of the Cotton Famine, from the Fall of Sumter to the Passing of the Public Works Act (1864). London: Saunders, Otley and Co.
- Platt, Stephen R. (2012). Autumn in the Heavenly Kingdom (2012). New York: Knopf, Random House. ISBN 978-0-307-27173-0.
- Birch, A. H. (1959). Small Town Politics, A Study of Political Life in Glossop. Oxford University Press.
- Farnie, D. A. (1979), The English Cotton Industry and the World Market 1815–1896, Clarendon Press, ISBN 0-19-822478-8
- Flood, Alison (9 August 2018). "Mill Workers' Poems about 1860s Cotton Famine Rediscovered". The Guardian.
- Quayle, Tom (2006). The Cotton Industry in Longdendale and Glossopdale. Stroud, Gloucestershire: Tempus. p. 126. ISBN 0-7524-3883-2.
- Watt, John (1866). The Facts of the Cotton Famine. Manchester: Alexander Ireland.
- Williams, Mike; Farnie (1992). Cotton Mills in Greater Manchester. Carnegie Publishing. ISBN 0-948789-89-1.
