= Dunham Massey Hall sundial =

Sculpture depicting a kneeling black man holding a sundial on his head

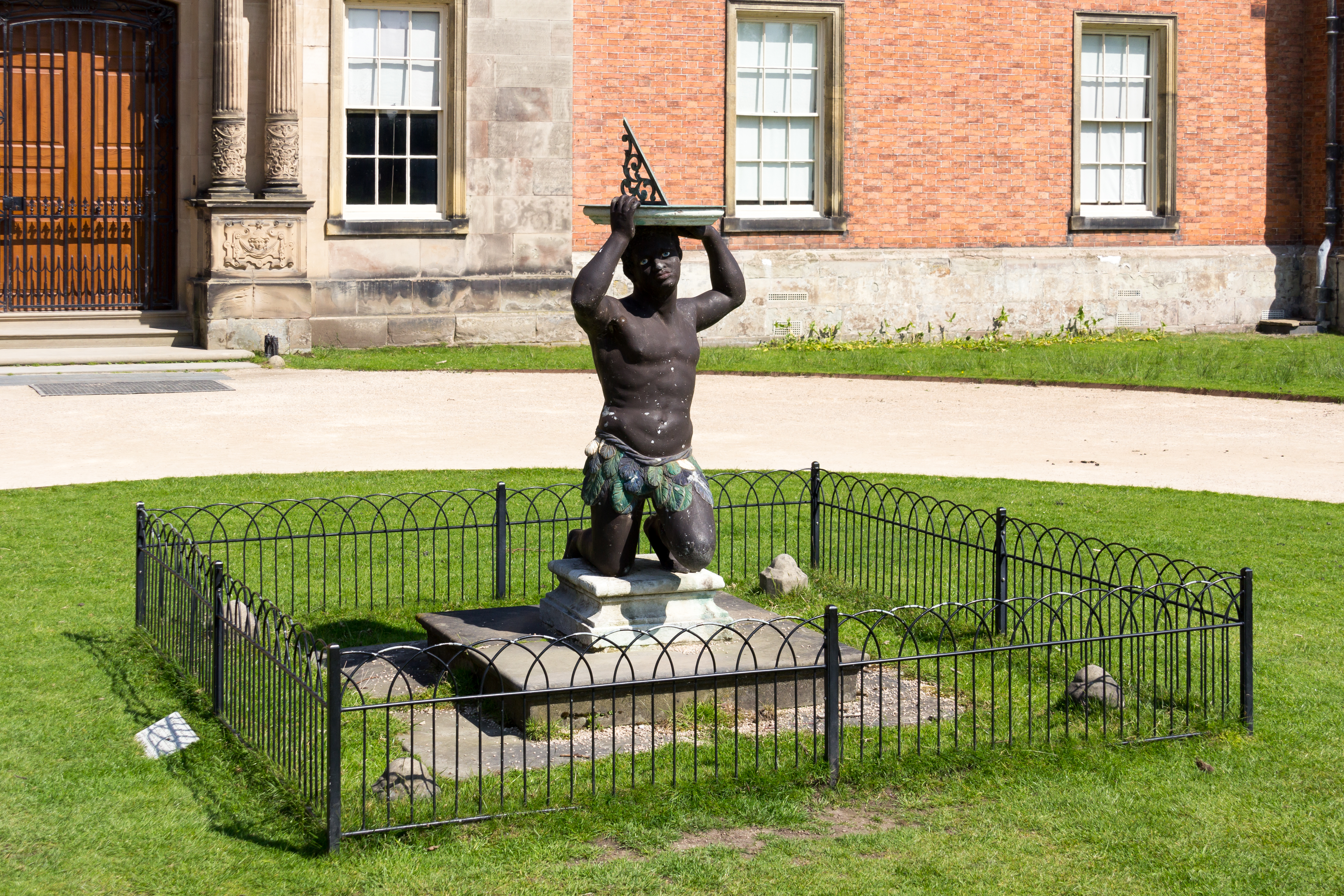
- The sundial in 2016
- Artist: attributed to Andries Carpentière after Jan van Nost
- Year: early 18th century
- Medium: Polychromed lead and bronze on a stone plinth
- Subject: Generic figure personifying the continent of Africa
- Dimensions: 185 cm × 114 cm (73 in × 45 in)
- Designation: Grade II listed
- Condition: Removed
- Location: Dunham Massey Hall; 53.38256°N 2.39979°W
- Owner: National Trust
- Website: nationaltrustcollections.org.uk

The Dunham Massey Hall sundial is a lead sculpture depicting a kneeling Black man holding a sundial on his head. It was created during the early 18th century, and until 2020 stood outside Dunham Massey Hall, a stately home in Cheshire, England.

Its subject matter attracted criticism and in 2020 the National Trust removed it amid the global wave of statue removals connected with the 2020 Black Lives Matter protests in the wake of the murder of George Floyd. It is currently held in storage.

== Description ==
The sundial sculpture is a black, polychromed cast-lead statue. It depicts a life-size kneeling figure of an African man wearing a feathered loincloth and holding a stone and brass sundial on his head. The figure's eyes are painted white with blue pupils, and the loincloth is painted blue and green. It dates from the 18th century and has been attributed to Andries Carpentière (1677–1737). It is thought that it was cast after a model by Jan van Nost (c. 1660–1729) which was installed in 1701 in the Privy Garden of Hampton Court Palace. It was probably commissioned by George Booth, 2nd Earl of Warrington (1675–1758).

The figure has been categorised as an example of a tradition in western art history called the "blackamoor", a personification of the continent of Africa, and as an anonymous 'kneeling slave'. The blackamoor caricatures appeared in a wide range of arts including sculpture, painting, architectural decoration, ceramics, silverware and furniture, and generally depicted a generic black person in exoticised costume and posted in a servile position, holding an object.

Close to the sculpture was a plaque containing the words: "This sundial is in the style of one commissioned by King William III. It represents Africa, one of four continents known at the time. The figure depicts a Moor, not a slave, and he has knelt here since before 1750."

== Controversy and removal ==
In June 2020, the National Trust announced that it was "reviewing" the statue amid the global wave of statue removals during the Black Lives Matter protests.

Shortly afterwards, the Trust took the decision to remove the statue from its prominent location outside Dunham Massey Hall, stating that the sculpture "caused upset and distress because of the way it depicts a black person and because of its prominence at the front of the house". The National Trust also stated that it did not plan to "censor or deny" colonial history, but intended to devise a new way of displaying it "in a way that fully acknowledges the appalling histories of slavery and the slave trade". Historic England noted that the National Trust had not requested listed building consent prior to the removal of the Grade II-listed sundial.

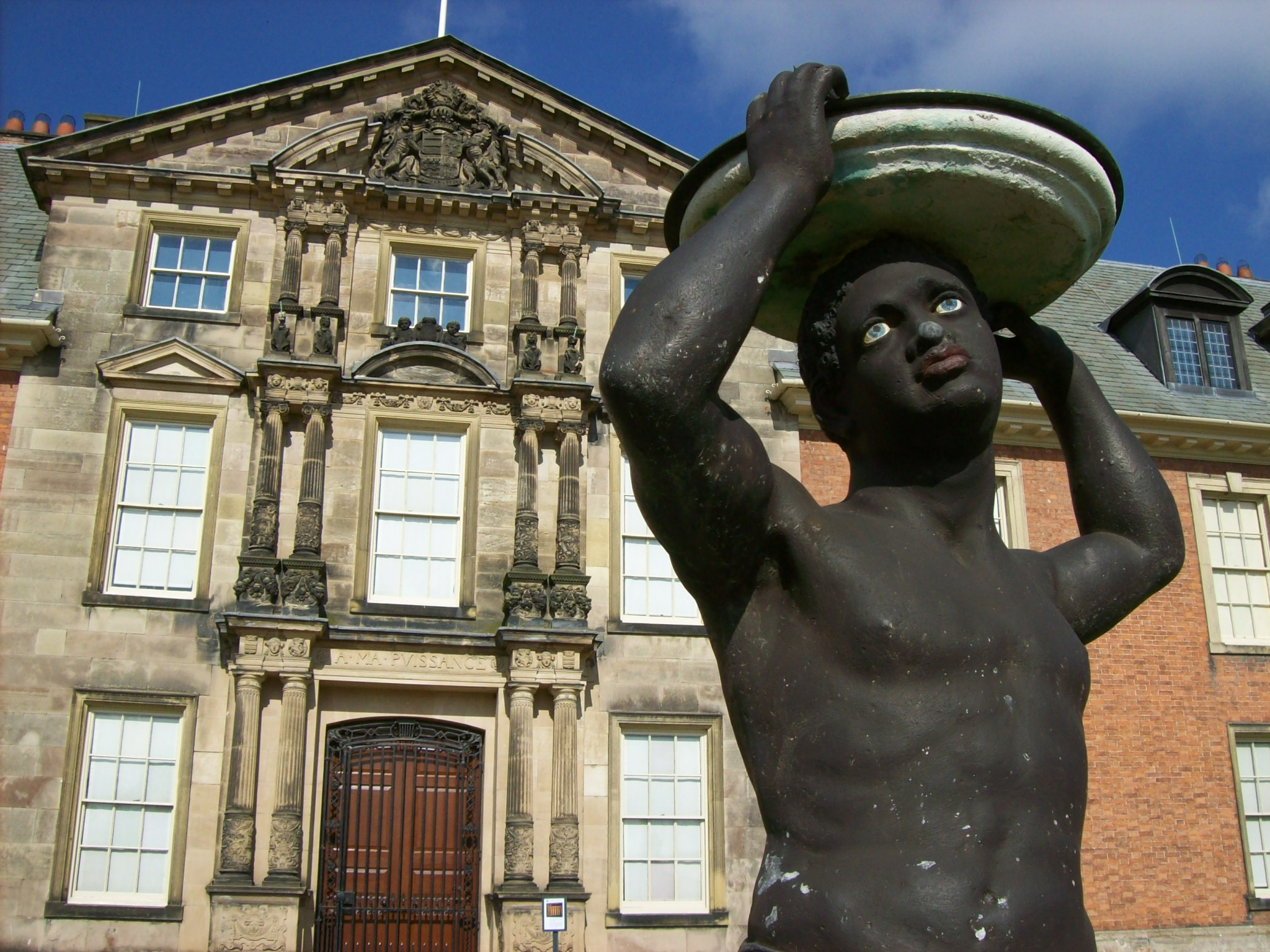
Detail of the statue

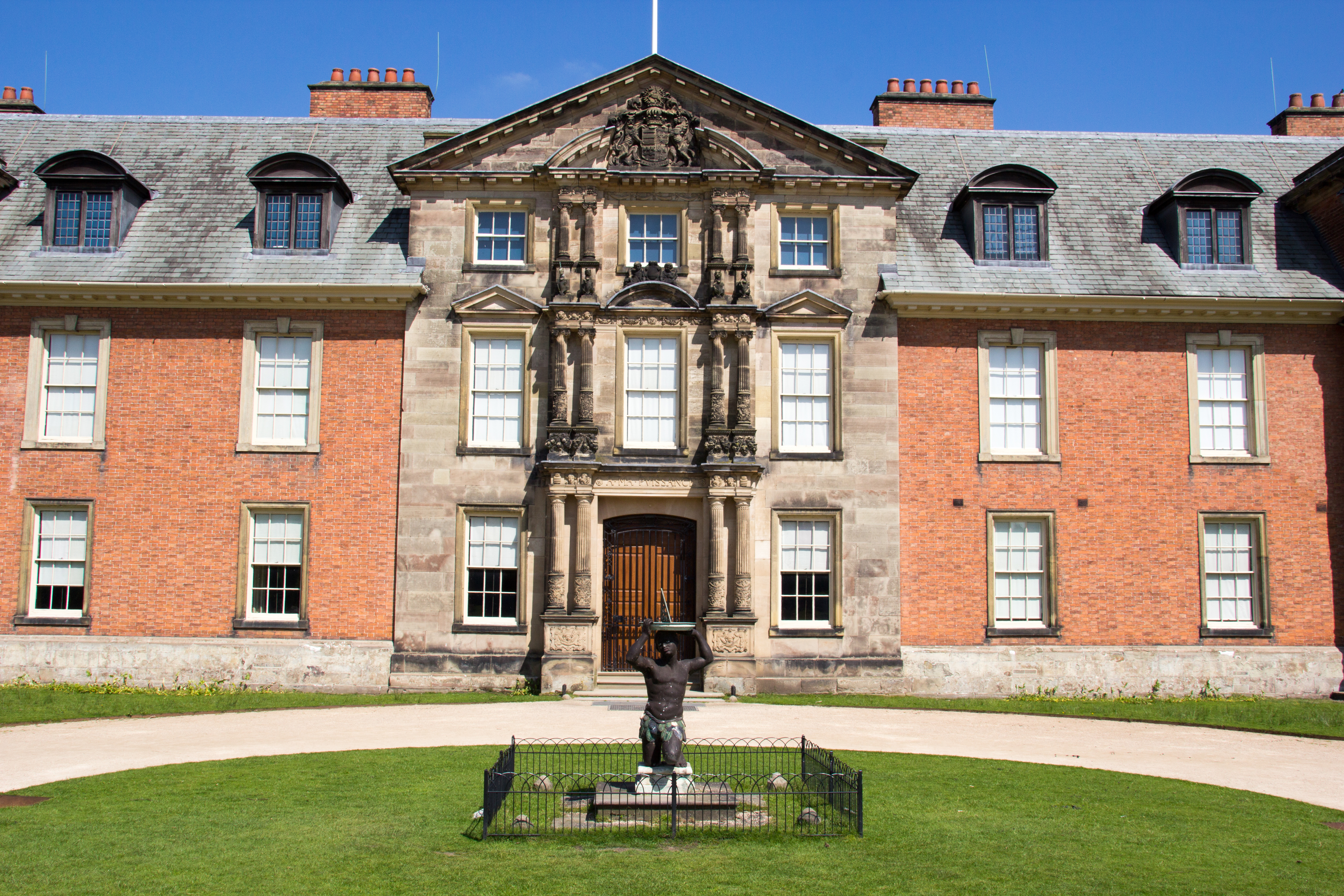
Position of the sculpture in front of the Hall prior to 2020

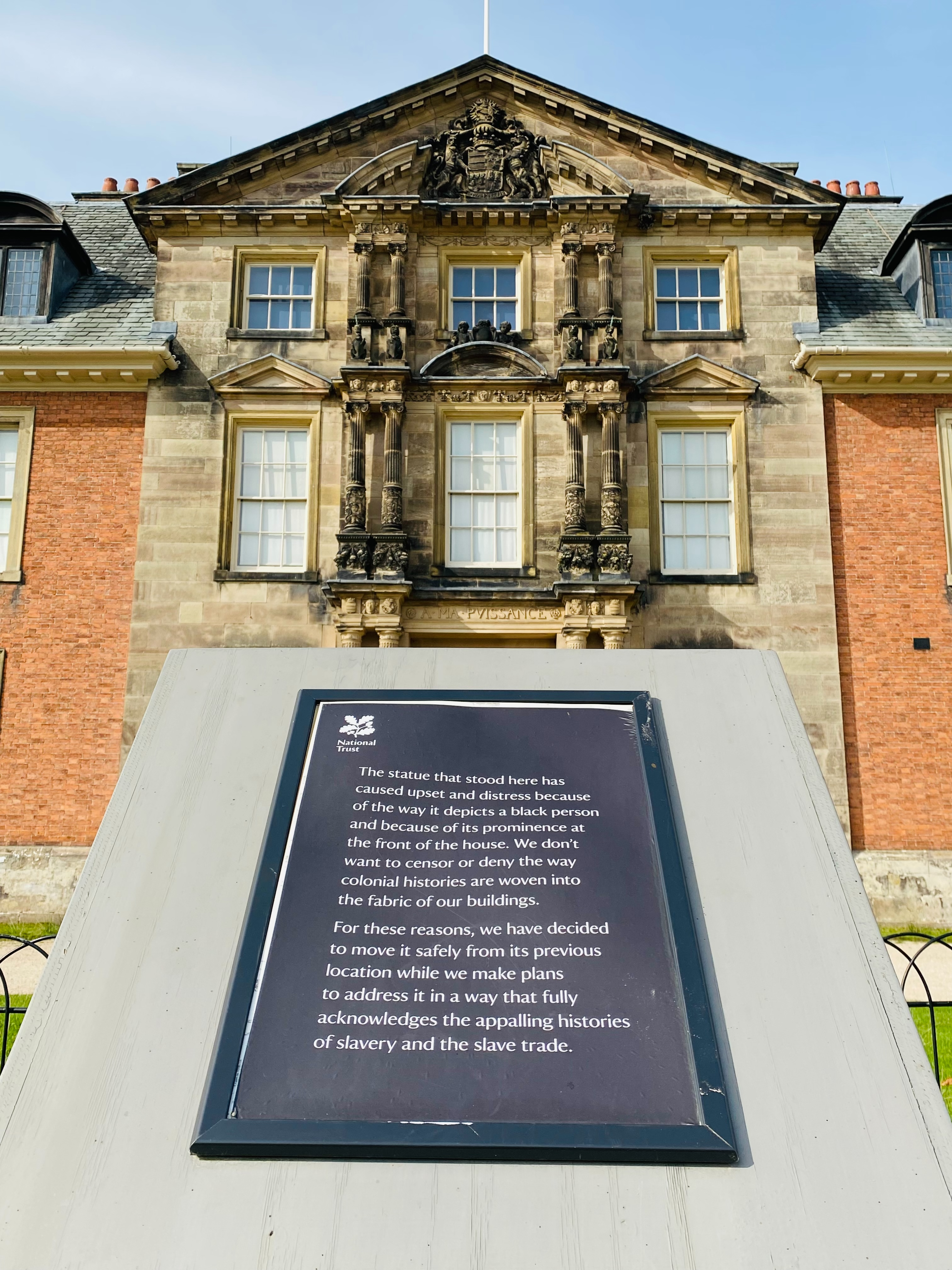
National Trust notice explaining the sculpture's removal
