= Dunham Massey Hall =

Grade I listed house in Greater Manchester, England

Coordinates: 53.3827°N 2.4000°W

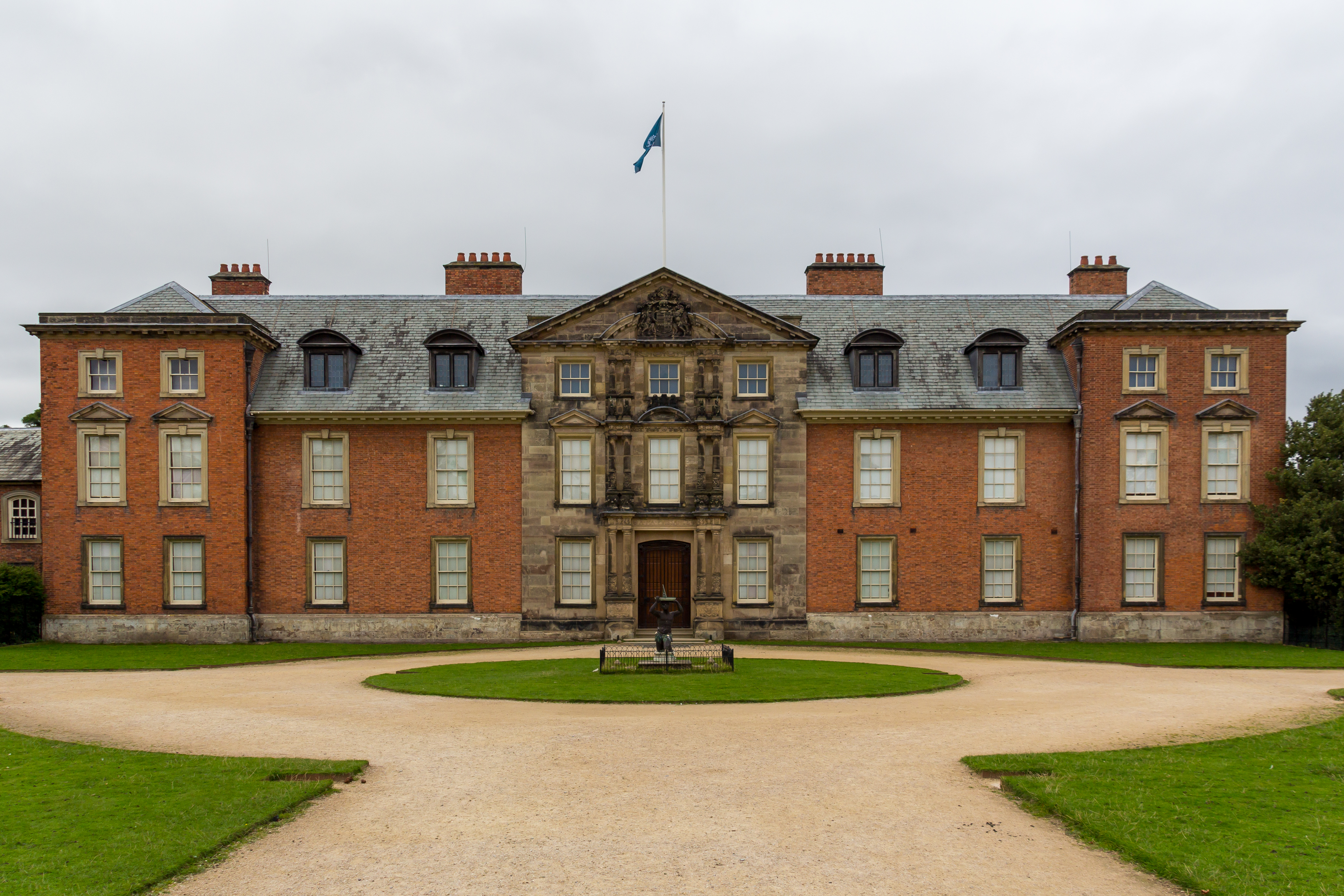

- Location within Greater Manchester
- Alternative names: Dunham Hall; Stamford Military Hospital

Website
- www.nationaltrust.org.uk/dunham-massey

Listed Building – Grade I
- Official name: Dunham Hall
- Designated: 5 March 1959
- Reference no.: 1356512

Dunham Massey Hall, usually known simply as Dunham Massey, is an English country house in the parish of Dunham Massey, in the district of Trafford, Greater Manchester, England. During World War I, it was temporarily used as the Stamford Military Hospital.

It was designated a Grade I listed building on 5 March 1959. It has been owned by the National Trust since the death of Roger Grey, 10th and last Earl of Stamford, in 1976. Dunham Massey was rebuilt in the early 18th century by George Booth, 2nd Earl of Warrington. He had inherited an older mansion from his father, which was in a very poor state of repair.

There were significant alterations, especially internally, at the start of the 20th century. It has historic formal gardens and a deer park. The park and gardens are listed Grade II* on the Register of Historic Parks and Gardens.

== History ==
'Old' Sir George Booth, 1st Baronet built the first mansion on the site in the early 17th-century. However, the house remained uncompleted by the time of his death and was only completed after the Civil War in the later 17th century by his grandson, 'Young' George Booth, 1st Baron Delamer. He inherited family debts and spent a considerable amount of energy investing in the future of Dunham Massey Hall; he planted trees to sell for timber and worked to recoup unpaid debts.

The mansion's service courtyard dates from c. 1721. The clock tower is inscribed with that date, suggesting that was when improvements were made to the stables. In the 1730s, John Norris was brought in to redesign the whole mansion by the 2nd Earl of Warrington, with a design of brick façade accentuated by bays and a stone centrepiece.

George Booth, 2nd Earl of Warrington died in 1758 and, in a move remarkable for the eighteenth century, ensured that his only child, a daughter, Lady Mary Booth (1704–72), would inherit and control the estate. She married her cousin, Harry Grey, 4th Earl of Stamford (1736–68), whose family properties included his estate of Enville Hall. Lady Mary oversaw the remodelling of the landscape at Dunham Massey, some of which, outside the park wall, was reputedly undertaken by Lancelot Capability Brown. Their son, George Harry Grey, 5th Earl of Stamford and Warrington, inherited both Dunham Massey and Enville Hall, along with other properties. In the 1780s, he commissioned a remodelling of the Great Gallery and the south front of the house by architect John Hope. He died in 1819 and his son, also George Harry Grey, but the 6th Earl of Stamford and Warrington inherited the estate and began to introduce modernisations to the house.

The 6th Earl died in 1845 and his grandson, George Harry Grey, inherited it and became the 7th Earl of Stamford. He married twice: first to Elizabeth (Bessie) King Billage, a shoemaker's daughter from Cambridge; the second to Catherine Cocks, a circus performer. However, the local gentry rejected his choices of wife, which led him to leave Dunham Massey and move to Enville Hall. The house was managed by Robert Cox, Catherine's nephew, and rented to tenants for periods in the subsequent fifty years. The descendants of Catherine's niece Sarah Letitia Cox, still occupy Enville Hall today.

The 7th Earl died in 1883 and his cousin, the Reverend Harry Grey inherited the title of 8th Earl of Stamford, but never lived at Dunham. At the time of his inheritance, he was living in South Africa, having left England due to alcohol and gambling addictions. He married three times: his first wife Susan Gaydon died in 1869; his second wife Annie Macnamara died in 1874. His third wife, Martha Grey, Countess of Stamford, a Khoekhoe woman, was the daughter of a freed, formerly enslaved, woman. She and the 8th Earl married in 1880. They had two children already, John and Frances, and their third, Mary, was born after they married. Despite their marriage being recognised by South African law at the time, it was not recognised under English law. This meant that, at the 8th Earl's death in 1890, his son, John, could not inherit and the title passed to William Grey, 9th Earl of Stamford, who was the nephew of the 7th Earl. He inherited the title, but no assets, until the death of the 7th Countess, Catherine Cox, in 1905. With his wife, Penelope Theobald, they led a programme of restoration for the house.

The house was modified in 1905–1908 by architect Compton Hall and by interior designer Percy Macquoid, in preparation for its reoccupation by William Grey, 9th Earl of Stamford. However, the 9th Earl died in 1910, just as the family was due to move in. Until these modifications, the southern front of the building had 11 three-storey bays; in order to make the building look more 17th-century in style, the third, fourth, eighth and ninth bays were reduced to two storeys, with dormers and a centrepiece of three bays was added, with columns each side of the central bay as well as stone pediments.

William Grey died in 1910 and was succeeded by his son, Roger Grey, 10th Earl of Stamford, who donated the house, its contents, and the 3,000-acre (1,200 ha) estate to the National Trust at his death in 1976. At the time, it was the trust's most generous bequest in its history.

=== Stamford Military Hospital ===
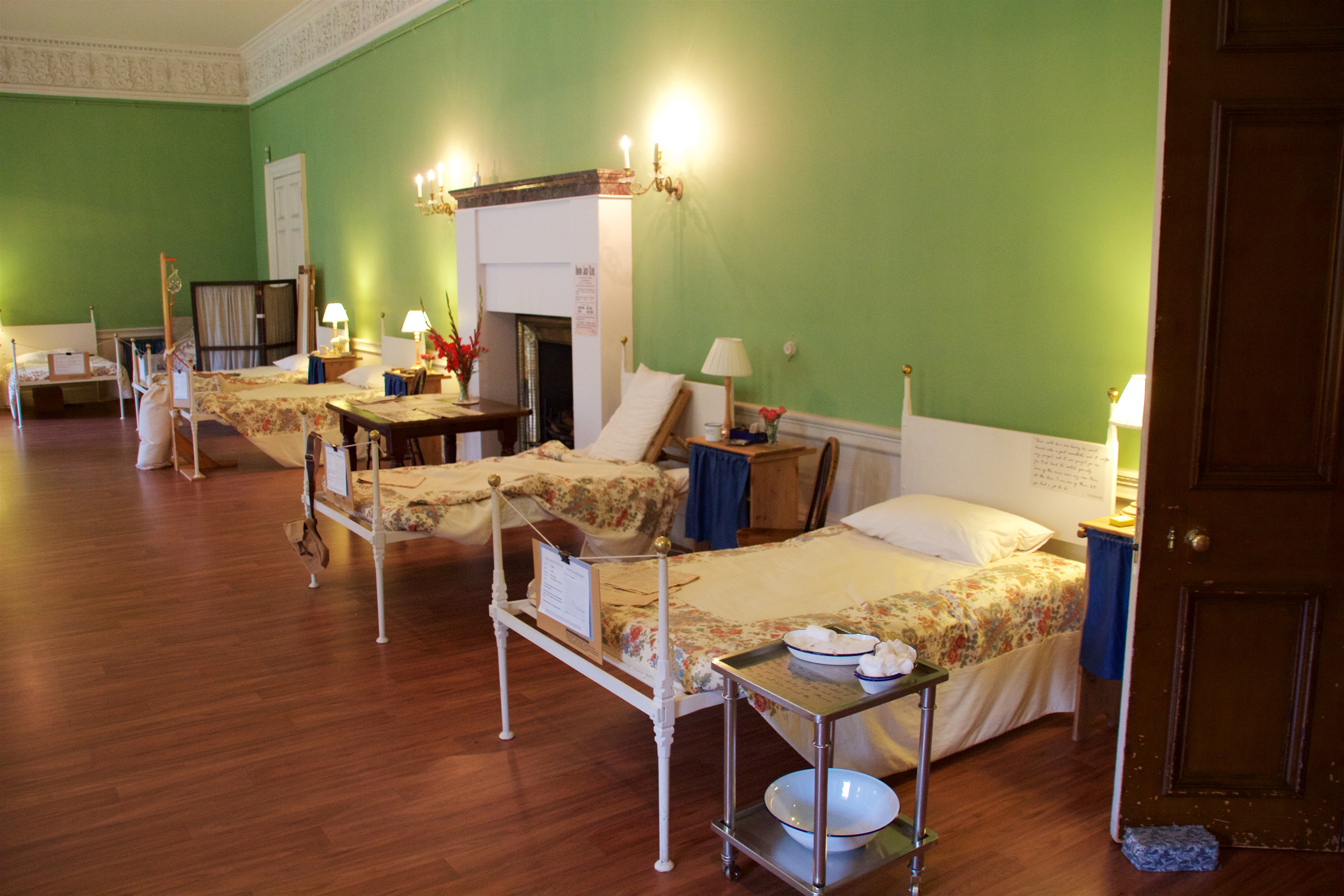
A ward inside Dunham Massey Hall as reconstructed in 2015

During World War I, Penelope Grey, Countess of Stamford, wife of the 9th Earl of Stamford, made the house available to the Red Cross as a military hospital, becoming known as the Stamford Military Hospital from April 1917 to January 1919. It hosted 182 injured soldiers who had suffered injuries and needed medical care, but not life-threatening, ranging from gas poisoning to bullets in the brain. The hospital was run by Sister Catherine Bennett. Lady Stamford's daughter, Lady Jane Grey (later Turnbull), trained as a nurse at the hospital.

From 1 March 2014 until 11 November 2016, the main ward at Stamford Military Hospital (known as "Baghdad"), along with the operating theatre, nurses' station and the recreation room were recreated to commemorate the 100-year anniversary of the start of World War I, along with actors playing the role of characters who worked, lived and recovered at the hospital.

== Collections ==
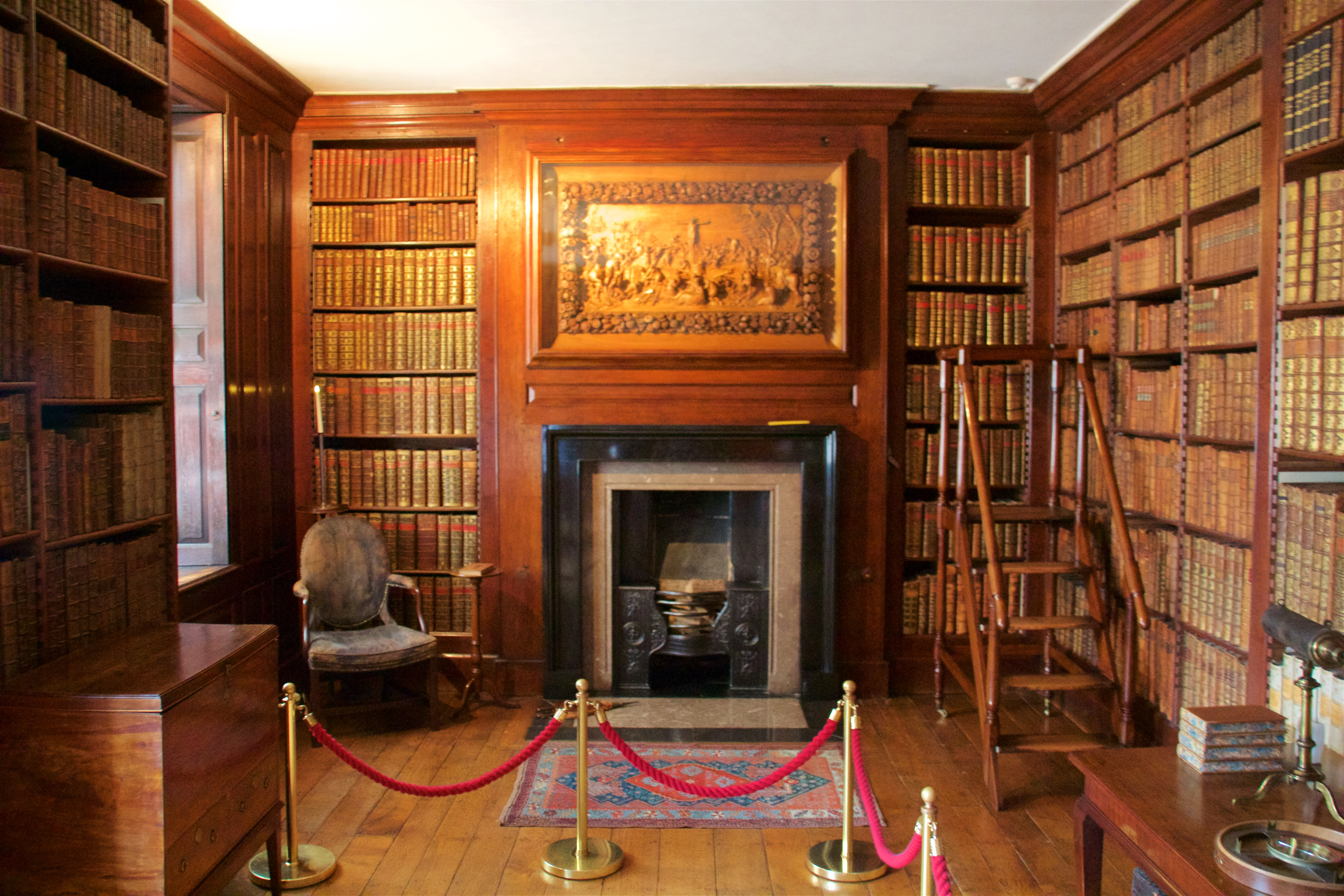
The library, with the Grinling Gibbons carving

Dunham Massey contains one of the most significant collections of Huguenot silver, largely collected by George Booth, 2nd Earl. During his 64 years at Dunham Massey, he accumulated over 1,000 pieces of silver. One sixth of the original plate remains at Dunham Massey, with much of the collection being dispersed by the Countess of Stamford and Warrington (who died in 1905), widow of George Harry Grey, 7th Earl (died 1883). The 10th Earl, Roger Grey, expended much money and effort in returning family heirlooms originally from Dunham Massey.

There is a fine collection of oil paintings and watercolours. The relief wood-carving of the Crucifixion by Grinling Gibbons, which hangs in the Library, is the earliest known work by the 17th-century wood carver. It is on this piece that he was working when he was discovered by John Evelyn in 1671. A group of paintings of the house and estate, known as the Harris Views, showing the 1730s mansion, were described by Simon Jenkins as "the most remarkable topographical survey of any country house and its grounds to remain in situ." There is also one painting is from 1690 by Adrien van Diest showing the earlier Elizabethan mansion. Another significant work in the art collection is an Allegory of Time by Guercino.

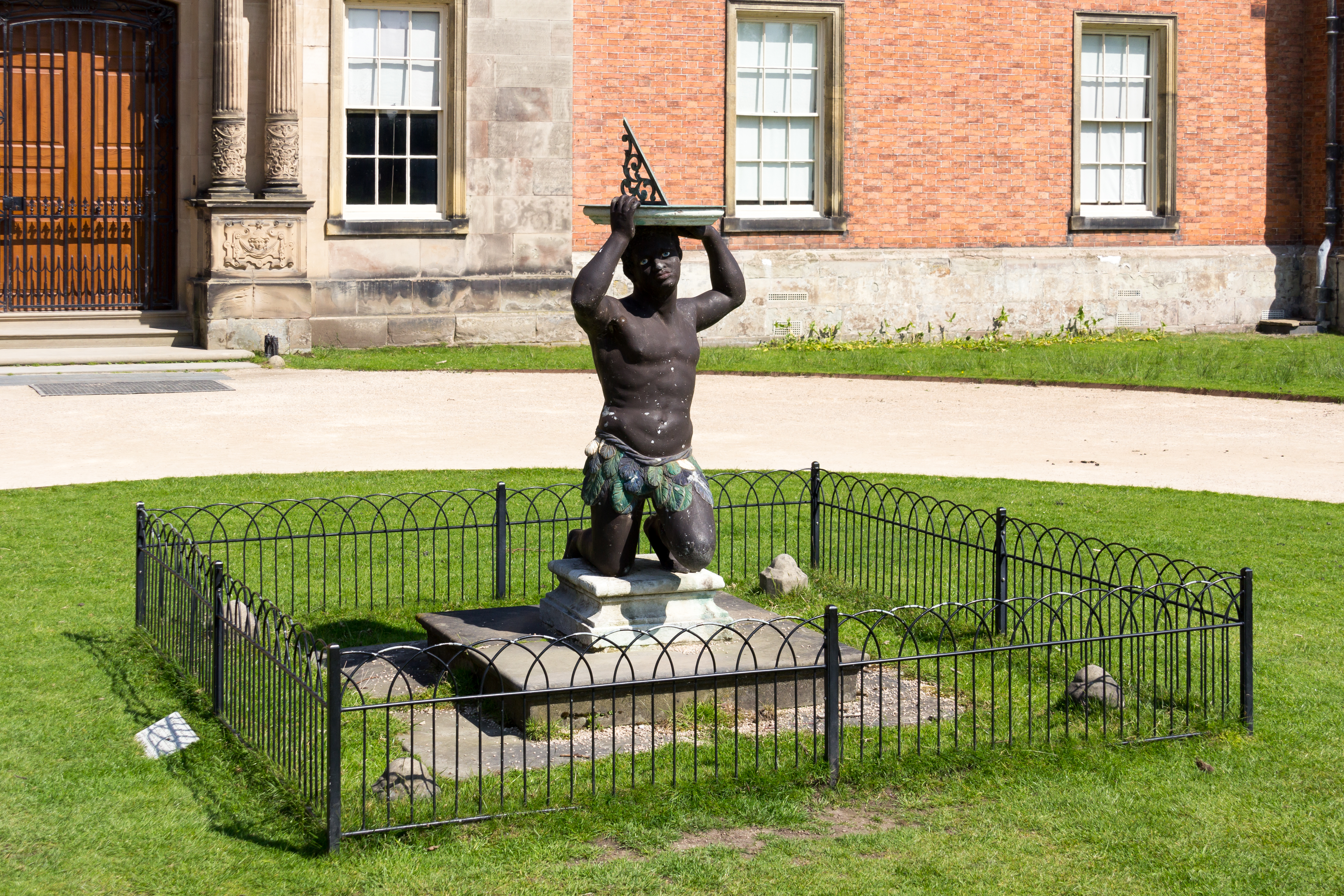
The statue and sundial formerly at the front of house

A life-sized statue of an exoticised black man wearing only a skirt of feathers, in a kneeling position and holding a sundial above his head, was previously situated at the front of the house. It is believed to have originally been a personification of Africa, produced by the sculptor Andries Carpentière in c. 1735 after a figure by John Nost for King William III's privy garden at Hampton Court. In June 2020, after numerous calls were made for the removal of statues in Britain with links to the slave trade in the wake of the murder of George Floyd, the National Trust said that the decision had been made to move the statue.

== Other buildings ==
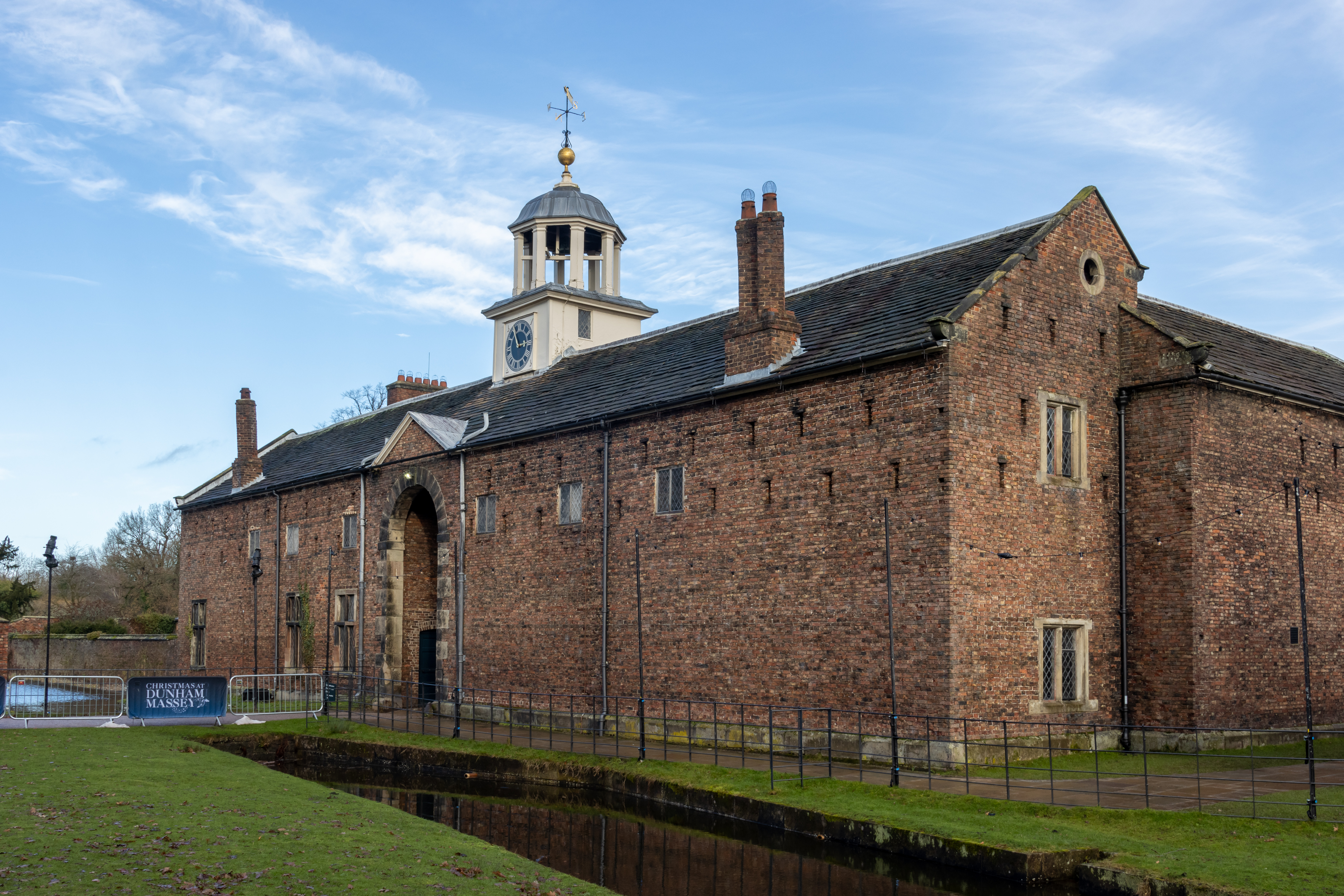
The carriage house

The chapel has oak panelling, pews and reredos. The silk wallcoverings in the chapel are a modern recreation, based on the original silk fabric, made in 2015–16. The double courtyard house is built of Flemish bond brick, stone dressings and a roof of Westmorland and Welsh slate.

The Carriage House, south of the kitchen courtyard, is Grade I listed. It has a clock turret, which displays a date of 1721.

South of the hall are the stable buildings, also Grade I listed. They probably date from 1721, but the west side was extended in the 18th century. The Stables Restaurant is located in the upstairs of the South Stables, with an ice-cream parlour below.

The oldest surviving building on the Dunham Estate is the watermill, possibly dating back to 1616. Originally built as a corn mill, it was later converted to a sawmill. It is Grade II* listed.

== Gardens and park ==
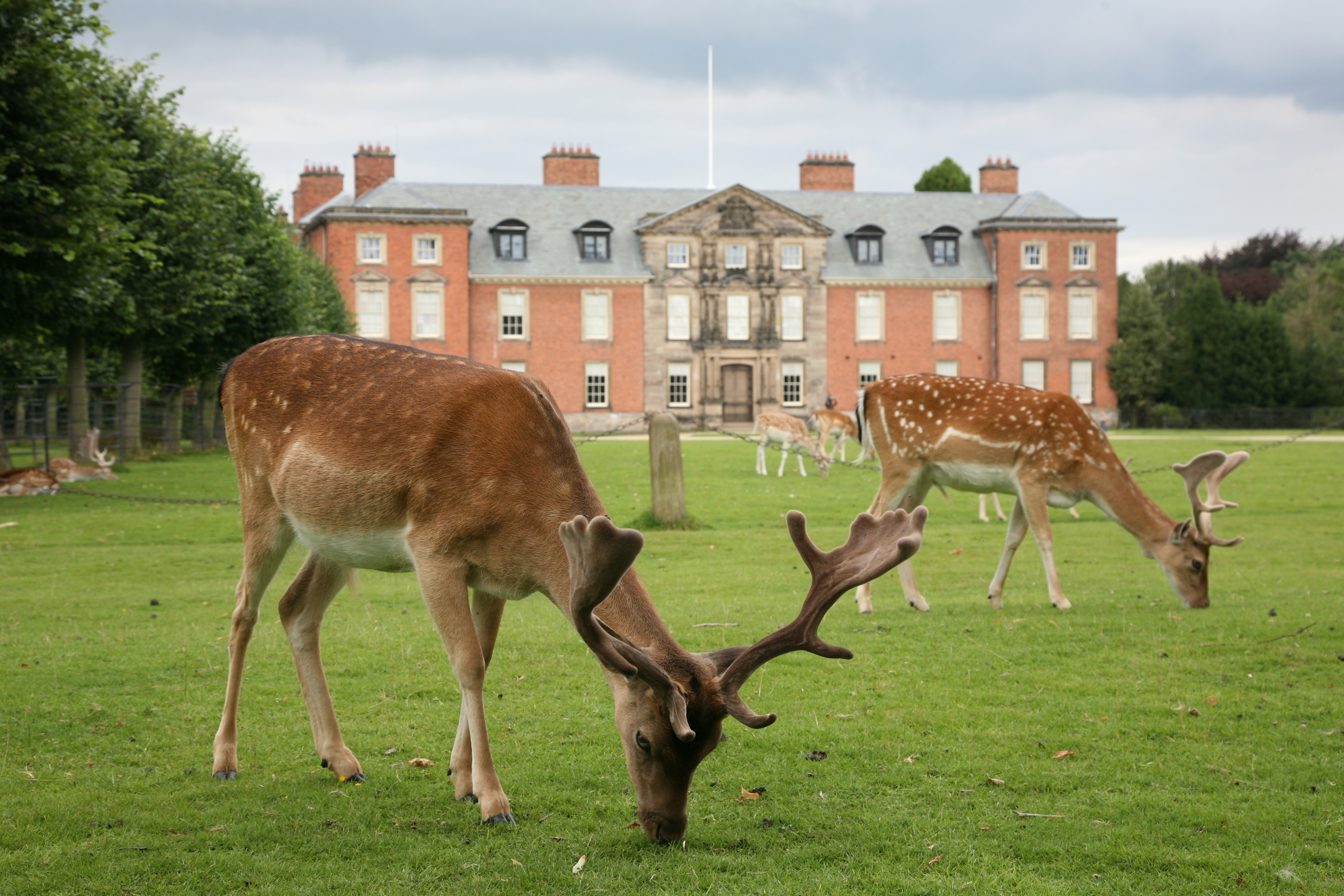
Deer in front of the house

It has historic formal gardens and a deer park. The park and gardens are listed Grade II* on the Register of Historic Parks and Gardens. The park is also a Site of Special Scientific Interest, based on the significance of its mature timber fauna. The 300-acre (120 ha) deer park at Dunham Massey dates back to medieval times.

As of 2012, the gardens housed over 700 plant species, as well as 1,600 trees and shrubs; it hosts the largest winter garden in Britain. The Winter Garden has many snowdrops, daffodils and bluebells.

During the Second World War, the eastern part of the estate was requisitioned for use first as a United States Army camp and later repurposed as Dunham Massey POW Camp.

== Listing and ownership ==
The stately home was designated a Grade I listed building on 5 March 1959. It has been owned by the National Trust since the death of the 10th and last Earl of Stamford in 1976. 557,886 people visited the site in 2025, making it one of the National Trust's top ten most popular sites; it was also the only Trust site where visitor figures increased during the COVID-19 pandemic.

== See also ==
- Grade I listed buildings in Greater Manchester
- Listed buildings in Dunham Massey
