= Roger Grey, 10th Earl of Stamford =

English peer (1896–1976)

Roger Grey
- 10th Earl of Stamford; 11th Baron Grey of Groby
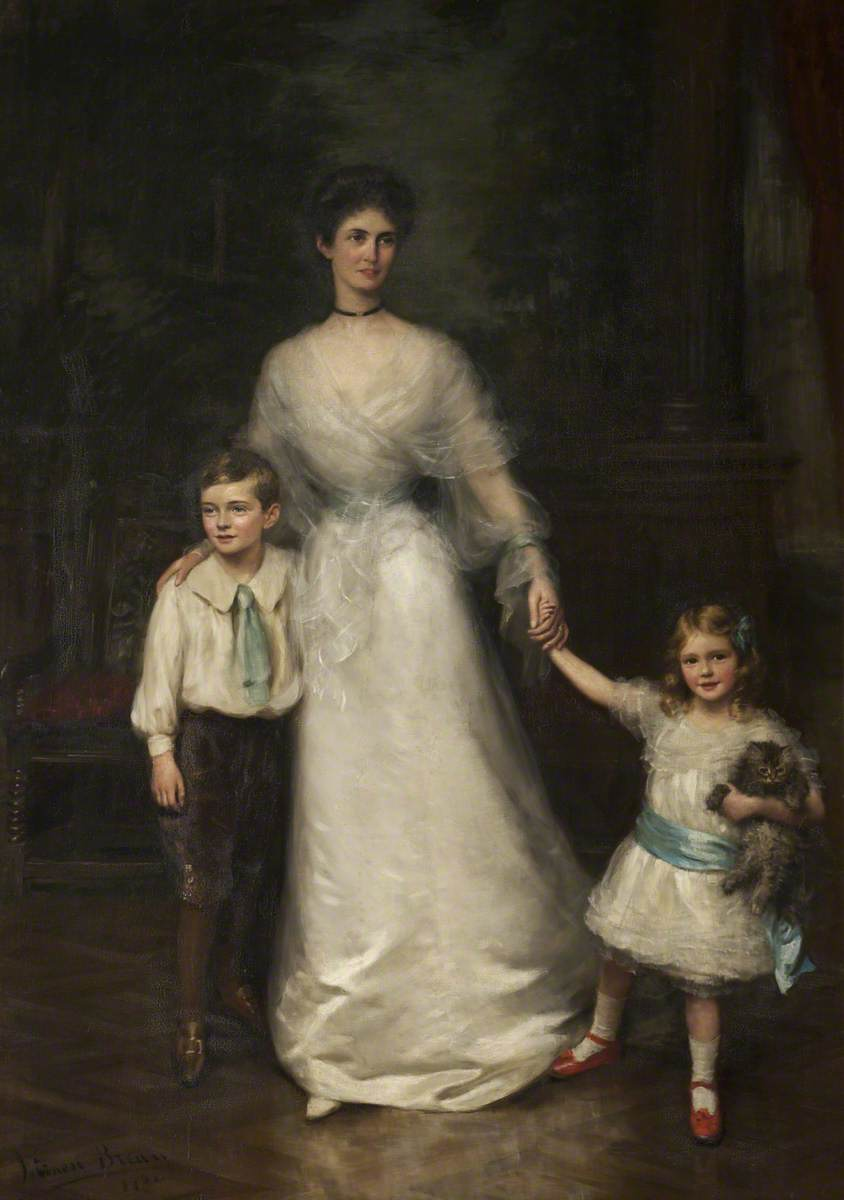
- John Ernest Breun (1862-1921) - Elizabeth Louisa Penelope Theobald (d.1959), Countess of Stamford, and Her Two Children, including Roger Grey
- Tenure: 24 May 1910 – 18 August 1976
- Born: 27 October 1896; London, England
- Died: 18 August 1976 (aged 79)
- Noble family: Grey
- Father: William Grey, 9th Earl of Stamford
- Mother: Penelope Theobald

Roger Grey, 10th Earl of Stamford (27 October 1896 – 18 August 1976) was an English peer. He took his seat in the House of Lords on 19 March 1919, but he rarely sat in the House.

== Life and activities ==
Born in London on 27 October 1896, he was known from birth by the courtesy title of Lord Grey of Groby. The only son of William Grey, 9th Earl of Stamford, and his wife, née (Elizabeth Louisa) Penelope Theobald (1865–1959), he was the brother of Lady Jane Grey (1899–1991), who became on marriage Lady Jane Turnbull.

Having inherited the earldom of Stamford at the age of thirteen, he took over the management of the Dunham Massey estate in 1917, on attaining his majority. In keeping with his father's outlook, he ran the estate on paternalistic lines, charging his agricultural tenants low rents in the belief that farming was less a business than a way of life.

Educated at Eton College and at New College, Oxford, from 1919, he was a 2nd Lieutenant in the Territorial Force Reserve during the First World War. In 1918–1919, he served as honorary attaché at the British legation in Bern. In the 1922 coalition government of David Lloyd George, he was Parliamentary Private Secretary (unpaid) to Viscount Peel, Secretary of State for India.

Highly respected in Altrincham, he was invited to become Charter Mayor of that town in 1937, the year of George VI's coronation. He continued as Mayor of Altrincham until 1938. For many years, he served as a Justice of the Peace and Deputy Lieutenant for the county of Cheshire.

Except on rare occasions in aid of charity, and by converting it into a military hospital during the First World War, Lord Stamford did not open his home to the public, choosing to live as a recluse. An idealist, he espoused the principles of Christian socialism and, although lacking their panache, his outlook was in harmony with the Young England movement. He and his mother were close friends of Hewlett Johnson, whom he may well have helped in his preferments to the deaneries of Manchester and Canterbury. He moved in the circle of Ramsay MacDonald.

At Dunham Massey, he entertained the exiled Emperor Haile Selassie I of Ethiopia after the latter's expulsion from the then Abyssinia. Known for avoiding conflict, he was a supporter of the League of Nations.

He is said to have persuaded Robert Hudson, 1st Viscount Hudson, Minister of Agriculture, to preserve the medieval deer park at Dunham Massey from tree-felling during the World War II. He sold his Carrington estate to a company which became a subsidiary of Royal Dutch Shell, but added to the landholding at Dunham Massey by prudent purchases of other farms in the post-war years.

On 17 July 1946, he and his mother entertained King George VI and Queen Elizabeth to luncheon at Dunham Massey.

== Dunham Massey Hall ==
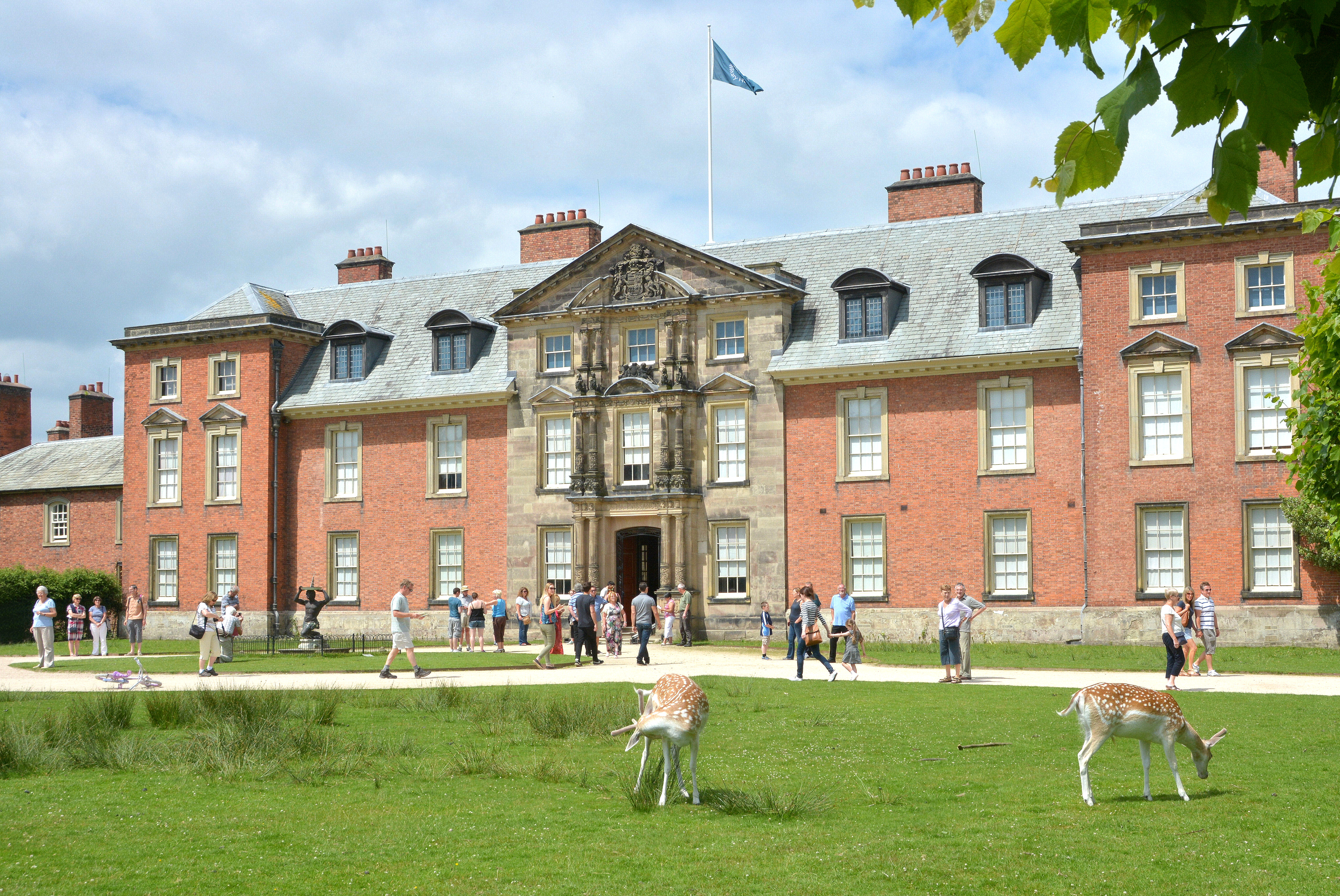
Dunham Massey Hall

His seat, Dunham Massey Hall in Altrincham, came to the Grey family in 1758 through the marriage of Harry Grey, 4th Earl of Stamford, to Lady Mary Booth, daughter and sole heiress of George Booth, 2nd Earl of Warrington.

== Death and legacy ==
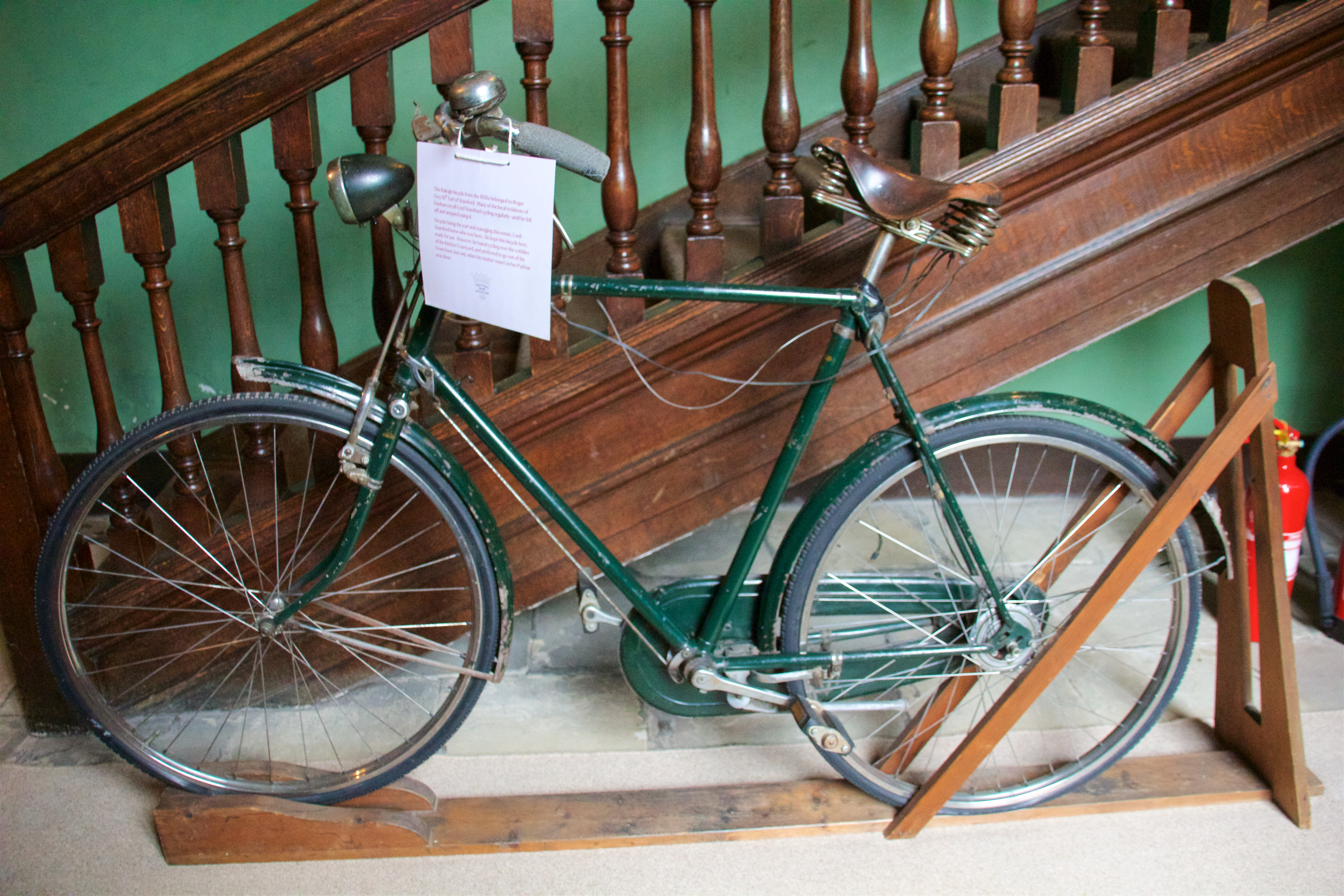
Raleigh bicycle from the 1930s belonging to Roger Grey, 10th Earl of Stamford

Lord Stamford did not marry. At his death in Manchester on 18 August 1976, both his peerage titles of Earl of Stamford and of Baron Grey of Groby became extinct. He bequeathed his Dunham Massey estate, the hall and its contents to the National Trust. He left a diary which records his collecting activities.

He was buried not in the family chapel in the parish church of Bowdon but in the churchyard of St Mark's, Dunham Massey, where he lies near his mother and with some family servants. A memorial to Stamford in the Bowdon parish church describes him as "A Landowner devoted to the Welfare of his People". There is another memorial to him at Bradgate Park, Leicestershire, an ancestral Grey estate, but one which he did not own.

The Dunham Massey archive is now in the possession of the John Rylands Library in Manchester, to which Stamford added the archive of Gilbert White, curate of Selborne in Hampshire, of whom he was a collateral descendant.

== Arms ==
Coat of arms of Roger Grey, 10th Earl of Stamford
Coronet A Coronet of an Earl Crest A Unicorn passant Ermine armed maned tufted and unguled Or in front of a Sun in Splendour proper Escutcheon Barry of six Argent and Azure Supporters On either side a Unicorn Ermine armed maned tufted and unguled Or Motto A ma puissance

== Notes ==
Peerage of England
Preceded by William Grey	Earl of Stamford; 1910–1976	Extinct
