= Peter Archambo I =

Huguenot goldsmith (1699–1759)

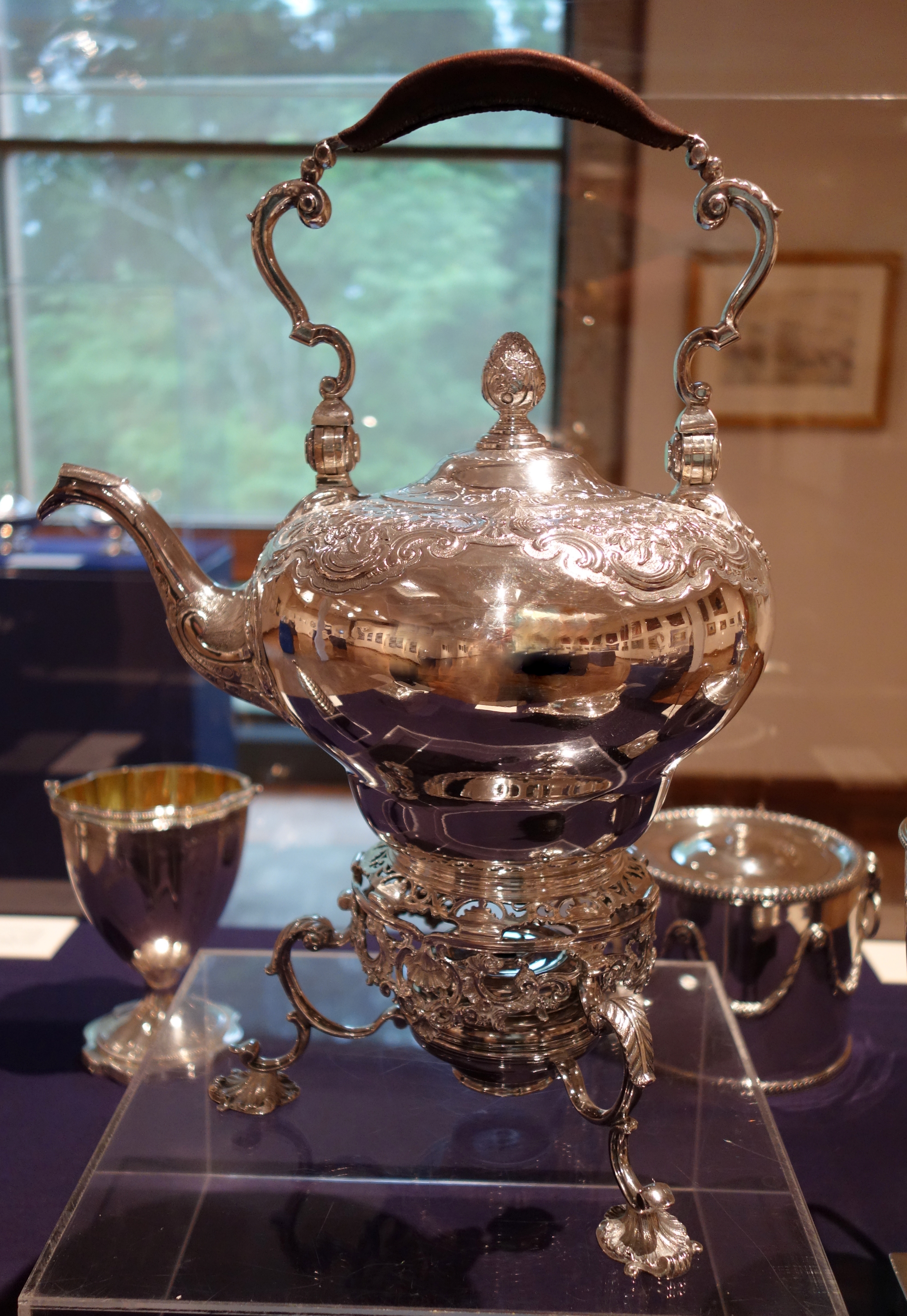
Silver kettle, stand, and burner by Peter Archambo I, 1740–1741

Peter Archambo I (1699–1759), in his time Peter Archambo, was a Huguenot silver- and goldsmith. He was the English-born son of the Huguenot refugee Archambault family from France. In 1710 he was apprenticed to the notable Huguenot goldsmith Jacob Margas (1677 – c. 1750).

The sons of Huguenot immigrants were often apprenticed to masters of Huguenot origin, benefitting from their master's manufacturing skill and design knowledge and thus were in a position to develop the ideas and designs brought by their masters from France. Huguenot silver is noted for its fine workmanship and design elements including strap work, cut card work, and cast and applied ornaments and decoration with elaborate engraving.

Archambo's work is described as French in influence and he is credited with helping to introduce the Rococo style into England (popular c. 1725 – c. 1765).

After serving as apprentice for ten years to Jacob Margas he became a Freeman of the Butchers' Company on 7 December 1720 (rather than the Goldsmiths' Company, which was restricting entry to foreigners into their guild). He first registered his mark in London in 1721, his second mark in 1722 and his third mark in 1739 and is thought to have retired around 1750 and to have died c. 1759.

Archambo's work is characterised as in a more restrained manner than that of some of his contemporaries such as the extraordinarily complex silversmith Paul de Lamerie, to whom his son, Peter Archambo (today distinguished as Peter Archambo II) was initially apprenticed.

Archambo produced much fine quality domestic silver encompassing a wide range of objects, including cups, candlesticks, cream jugs and cake baskets. The wares often feature marine motifs such as shells and figures such as Neptune.

In 1731 he produced the hot water kettle with a circular body with a finely engraved contemporary armorial crest now part of the collection at The Johnston Collection in East Melbourne in Victoria. Shells and Neptune adorn this elegant item which would have been a key requisite for entertaining in style.

Other of his works in well known collections include the magnificent wine urn chased with masks, shells and strap-work, and its companion, a wine cistern commissioned by George Booth, 2nd Earl of Warrington (1675–1758), which remain in the notable collection of silver at Dunham Massey Hall in Cheshire. The Gilbert Collection now at the Victoria and Albert Museum, London, has a neo-classical hot-water urn and a set of three exquisite caddies with finely engraved decoration. At the Metropolitan Museum of Art in New York City there are a pair of plain ewers dated 1740 and a pair of sauce boats dated 1733–1734.

Thomas Heming was apprenticed to Archambo from 1735 to 1745, and his work, distinctly French in character, shows signs of his master's influence. Heming was an influential and highly regarded goldsmith and from 1760 to 1782 he was appointed Principal Goldsmith to George III. He was responsible for many pieces of large and important silverware, including regalia and plate for the coronation of George III in 1761.
