= Nathaniel Booth, 4th Baron Delamer =

English peer (1709–1770)

Nathaniel Booth, 4th Baron Delamer (9 June 1709 – 9 January 1770) was an English peer who served as Chairman of Committees in the House of Lords from 1765.

== Family ==
The 6th and eldest surviving son of Dr Robert Booth, Dean of Bristol, he succeeded in the family titles as Baron Delamer and a baronet upon the death in 1758 of his cousin George, Earl of Warrington, being a patrilineal descendant of the 1st Baron Delamer but not of the 1st Earl of Warrington; the Dunham Massey estates were left to the Earls of Stamford via Lady Mary Booth's marriage.

In 1743, Nathaniel Booth married Margaret, daughter of Richard Jones, of Ramsbury Manor, Wiltshire. Lord and Lady Delamer lived in London at Cavendish Square and at Burgh House, Hampstead; they had two sons, both of whom died young, and a daughter, Elizabeth, who died unmarried in 1765. Lady Delamer died in 1773.

When Lord Delamer died in 1770 the barony (cr. 1661) became extinct whilst the baronetcy was inherited by his second cousin and heir male, the Revd Sir George Booth, Rector of Ashton-under-Lyne, who was seated at Cotterstock Hall, Northamptonshire.

== See also ==
- Baron Delamer
- House of Lords

Peerage of England
Preceded by George Booth	Baron Delamer; 1st creation 1758–1770	Extinct
Baronetage of England
Preceded by George Booth	Baronet (of Dunham Massy); 1758–1770	Succeeded by George Booth
