= Heming (company) =

British jewellery company

Heming & Co. Limited
- Company type: Private
- Industry: Jewellery
- Founded: London (1745)
- Founder: Thomas Heming
- Headquarters: London, United Kingdom
- Website: hemingjewels.com

Heming is a British jewellery company, founded in London in 1745. The company has a showroom in the Piccadilly Arcade near to the original store on Piccadilly.

== History ==
Thomas Heming's trade card & shop interior, The King's Arms, New Bond St c.1765

Heming's history dates to 1738 when Thomas Heming began his apprenticeship to the Huguenot silver and goldsmith Peter Archambo. In 1745 Thomas Heming entered his first mark at Goldsmith's Hall, registered to a Piccadilly address, before going on to trade from his shop at the King's Arms in New Bond Street, opposite Clifford Street. Heming was made a freeman of the Worshipful Company of Goldsmiths in 1746 and rose to prominence in 1760 with his appointment as Principal Goldsmith to King George III, a position held until 1782.

It was Lord Bute, one of Heming's most important patrons, who encouraged this significant new appointment. Heming was the first working goldsmith to hold this post since the early seventeenth century and the majority of pieces were made in his own workshop. The superb quality and refined delicacy of many of the items reflect the influence of Peter Archambo.

== Products ==
During Thomas Heming's tenure as Principal Goldsmith to the King, George III commissioned numerous items including the Coronation Service. A large number remain with the Royal Collection.

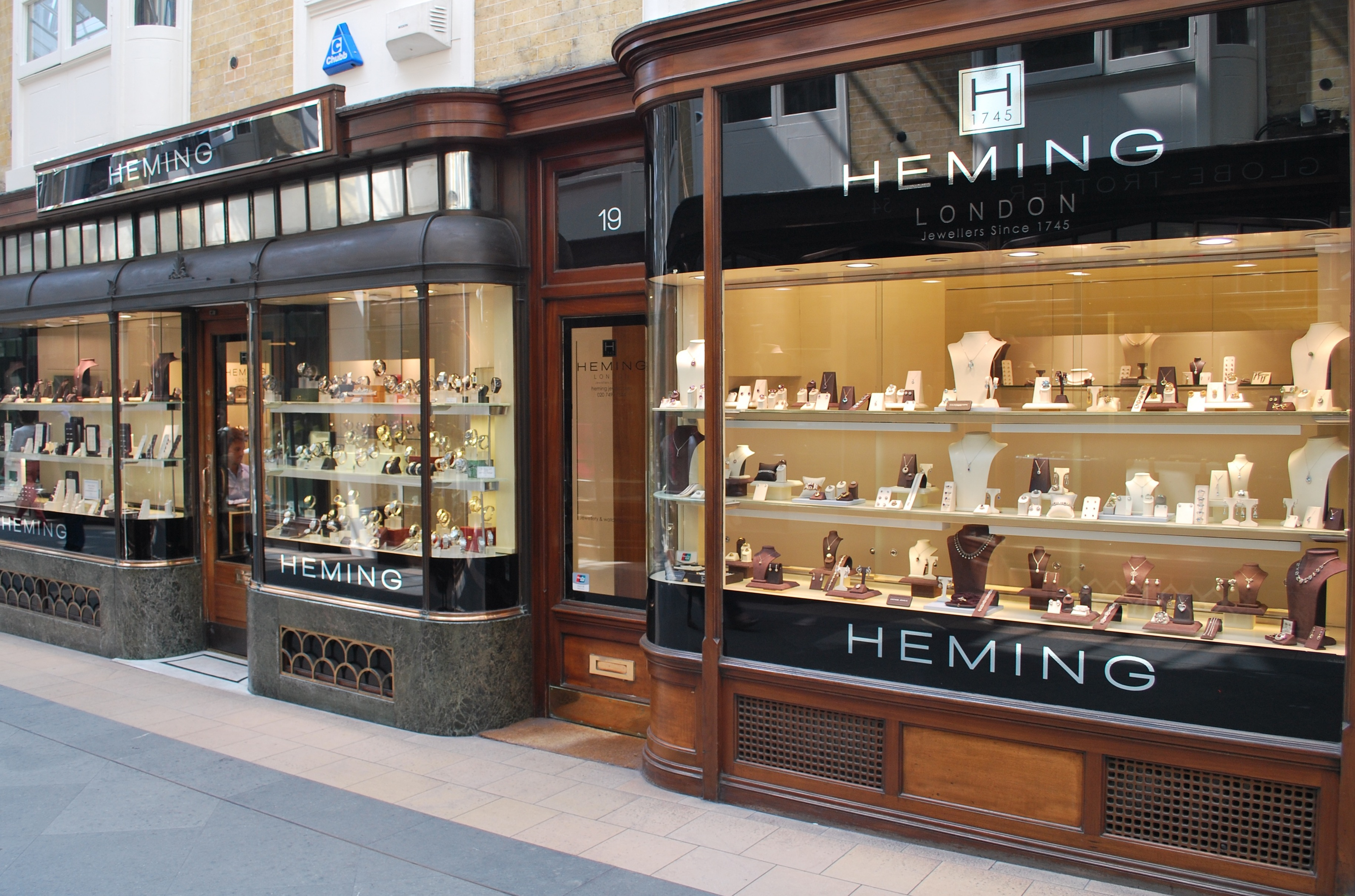
View of the current Heming store at London's Piccadilly Arcade

Heming's reputation as a British jeweller grew during the 20th century with additional Royal Appointments. Today the company designs classic jewellery as well as contemporary collections incorporating diamonds and gemstones set in precious metals.
