= Listed buildings in Dunham Massey =

Dunham Massey is a civil parish in the Metropolitan Borough of Trafford, Greater Manchester, England. It contains 48 listed buildings that are recorded in the National Heritage List for England. Of these, three are listed at Grade I, the highest of the three grades, one is at Grade II*, the middle grade, and the others are at Grade II, the lowest grade.

The major building in the parish is Dunham Massey Hall; the hall, many structures associated with it, and buildings in its adjacent park are listed. The rest of the parish is mainly rural, and contains the settlements of Dunham Town, Sinderland Green, and Dunham Woodhouses. Most of the listed buildings outside Dunham Massey Park and Gardens are houses and cottages, farmhouses and farm buildings. The Bridgewater Canal passes through the parish and a bridge and an aqueduct associated with it are listed. The other listed buildings include another bridge, an obelisk, a former school, a former water-powered mill, and a war memorial.

== Key ==
Grade	Criteria
I	Buildings of exceptional interest, sometimes considered to be internationally important
II*	Particularly important buildings of more than special interest
II	Buildings of national importance and special interest

== Buildings ==
Name and location	Photograph	Date	Notes	Grade
Sawmill; 53.38141°N 2.40049°W		1616 (possible)	A watermill in the grounds of Dunham Massey Hall, originally a corn mill and later a sawmill, it is in brick on a stone plinth, with stone dressings, quoins, and a stone-slate roof with coped gables. There are two storeys and an attic. On the south front is a semi-circular stone arched waterwheel housing, and on the north side is a projecting wing. Some windows are mullioned, and there are oeil-de-boeuf windows. Inside is a reconstructed overshot waterwheel, and items of machinery.	II*
Kitchen garden wall and Gardener's Cottage; 53.38495°N 2.39638°W		Early 17th century (possible)	The garden wall is the older part, Gardener's Cottage dating possibly from 1702. The wall encloses the kitchen garden and has a roughly square plan. It is in brick with stone dressings and copings, buttresses, heating flues in the northwest side, and a southwest gateway with a segmental arch. The cottage has a stone-slate roof, two storeys and three bays. The entrance front has a central doorway, mullioned windows on the ground floor and casement windows above. At the rear is a segmental-headed cart entry with a keystone, and mullioned windows.	II
Elm Tree Cottage and Lime Tree Cottage; 53.38464°N 2.39195°W		17th century (possible)	A house, later two cottages, in brick on a stone plinth, with a slate roof, two storeys, three bays, and a rear extension. The original doorway and the ground floor windows have segmental brick arches, and the windows are casements.	II
Magnolia Cottage and Meadows Cottage; 53.38805°N 2.39060°W		17th century	A pair of cottages that have been considerable altered, they are in brick with thatched roofs, two storeys, a single-depth plan, and a central door flanked by a casement window on each side. The left cottage has two eyebrow dormer windows; the right cottage has a stone plinth, the remains of timber framing, and a 20th-century dormer window.	II
Stables west of Barn Cottages; 53.38255°N 2.40233°W		Late 17th or early 18th century	The stables are in brick with stone dressings and a stone-slate roof with coped gables. There are two storeys, with stables below and a hayloft above. On the ground floor are two segmental-headed doorways and mullioned windows. On the upper floor are five square pitching holes, and in each gable is a circular pitching hole.	II
Langham Grove Obelisk; 53.37900°N 2.39990°W		1714	The obelisk is in the grounds of Dunham Massey Hall. It is in stone and stands on an inscribed pedestal with a moulded base and cornice. The pedestal has a base of five steps.	II
Orangery; 53.38381°N 2.39935°W		c. 1720	The orangery in the grounds of Dunham Massey Hall is in brick on a stone plinth, with a timber eaves cornice and a hipped stone-slate roof. There are five bays, each with a semicircular-headed sash window, the central one also with a door. At the rear is a yard enclosed by a wall with stone copings.	II
Wellhouse and root arbour 53.38419°N 2.39912°W		c. 1720	The wellhouse is the earlier, the root arbour dating probably from the 18th century. The wellhouse is in brick with stone dressings and a stone-slate roof. There are two storeys, with cisterns on the top floor and a well on the ground floor, three entrances, and round-headed windows. Inside are suction pumps for domestic water supply to Dunham Massey Hall. The root arbour has five sides, and arched openings supported on tree trunks.	II
Carriage house, Dunham Massey Hall; 53.38232°N 2.40069°W		1721	The former carriage house is in brick with stone dressings and a stone-slate roof. There are two storeys, and a U-shaped plan, consisting of a seven-bay range, with four-bay wings around a courtyard. In the centre is a tall carriageway with giant pilasters, an entablature and a pediment in the inside, and a semicircular archway with impost blocks, voussoirs and a pediment on the outside. Above this is a timber clock turret, a lead-covered cupola, and a weathervane. On the inside, flanking the carriageway, are three segmental arches on the ground floor. The windows are cross windows on the ground floor and segmental-arched windows above.	I
Stables, Dunham Massey Hall; 53.38193°N 2.40040°W		1721 (probable)	The former stables were extended to the west in the 18th century. They are in brick on a stone plinth, with stone dressings, a band, and a hipped stone-slate roof. There are two storeys, a U-shaped plan, with nine bays and two-bay wings on the east front. In the central bay is a segmental-headed doorway with pilasters, a triple keystone, an entablature, and a pediment. There are two further doorways on the ground floor and cross windows, and on the upper floor are oeil-de-boeuf windows. The west front has seven bays, and similar windows to the east front. The central bay projects slightly and contains a semicircular -headed doorway with a triple keystone, and at the top a small pediment. At each end is a mounting block.	I
Dunham Hall; 53.38275°N 2.39986°W		c. 1721	The oldest part in the service court, the main part of the house was built in 1732–40, and the south front was remodelled in 1905–07. The hall is in brick with stone dressings, a green slate roof, and has a double courtyard plan. The south front has eleven bays and a modillion eaves cornice. The central three and the outer two bays on each side project, and have three storeys, the other bays having two storeys and dormers. The central three bays are pedimented, and the windows are sash windows. The east front has eleven bays, a stone plinth, a plain eaves cornice, a coped parapet, two semicircular-headed stair windows, and a one-storey bow window. The north front has 13 bays, and the main courtyard has sides of seven and four bays.	I
Agden View; 53.38642°N 2.41179°W		1725	A brick house with a slate roof and two storeys, it was extended to the right by one bay in the 18th century, and by another bay with a higher roofline in the early 19th century. The windows in the right bay are sash windows, and elsewhere they are casements. At the rear is a 20th-century porch.	II
Barn near Gardener's Cottage; 53.38585°N 2.39807°W		Early 18th century	The barn, which is in an isolated position in a field, is in brick with a slate roof. There are two storeys and two bays, a blocked circular pitching hole, and a doorway with a pointed head. Inside is a raised cruck truss.	II
Ivy House; 53.38427°N 2.39273°W		Early 18th century	A brick house with brick bands, a modillion eaves cornice, and a slate roof. There are two storeys with an attic, a double-depth plan, three bays, and a 20th-century garage on the right. The doorway has a moulded timber surround and a pediment, and the windows are casements with cambered brick arches.	II
Pier (northwest); 53.38242°N 2.40030°W		Early 18th century	The pier is at the northwest corner of the forecourt garden of Dunham Massey Hall. It is in stone, about 1.5 metres (4 ft 11 in) tall with a square plan, and has a projecting plinth and cornice.	II
Pier (southeast); 53.38212°N 2.39865°W		Early 18th century	A garden feature at the southeast corner of the forecourt garden of Dunham Massey Hall. It is in stone and consists of a rectangular pier with a projecting base and a cornice. On the pier is the statue of a lion, from the crest of the Booth family. It is flanked by two short walls with scrolled copings.	II
Pier (southwest); 53.38176°N 2.40002°W		Early 18th century	A garden feature at the southwest corner of the forecourt garden of Dunham Massey Hall. It is in stone and consists of a rectangular pier with a projecting base and a cornice. On the pier is the statue of a lion, from the crest of the Booth family. It is flanked by two short walls with scrolled copings.	II
Sundial; 53.38259°N 2.39980°W		Early 18th century	The sundial was in the forecourt of Dunham Massey Hall. It consists of a kneeling African figure in lead on a two-step plinth holding the sundial on his head. This statue was removed by the National Trust in 2020 in response to the Black Lives Matter movement and replaced with an explanatory plaque.	II
Temple; 53.38280°N 2.40495°W		Early 18th century	The Temple is a garden feature in the grounds of Dunham Massey Hall. It is in stone, and consists of a shelter with a moulded pediment, and recesses on two sides. The recesses have segmental heads, impost bands, and keystones.	II
Two piers and lakeside wall 53.38334°N 2.40034°W		Early 18th century	The wall runs along the south side of The Moat in the grounds of Dunham Massey Hall. It is in brick with rounded and moulded stone coping. In the centre are two square stone piers that have bead moulded corners, and a moulded cornice and plinth. The coping sweeps up to meet the piers.	II
Two small piers 53.38192°N 2.39925°W		Early 18th century	The piers flank the drive at the south of the forecourt garden of Dunham Massey Hall. They are in stone, and have rectangular shafts, each with a base, a cornice and a pyramidal cap.	II
Big Tree Cottages; 53.38468°N 2.39271°W		1730	Originally a house and a cottage, later three cottages, they are in brick and have a slate roof with coped gables. The cottages have two storeys, a double-depth plan, and one bay each. The doorway and the ground floor windows have segmental-arched heads, and all the windows are casements. On the upper floor is a decorative datestone.	II
Deer House; 53.38209°N 2.38732°W		1740	The deer house is in the grounds of Dunham Massey Hall. It is in brick, and has a roof of stone-slate with coped gables. There are two storeys with a hayloft above, and access for the deer below. On three sides is a continuous lean-to containing seven semi-elliptical arches. There are vents along the sides, an oeil-de-boeuf window at one end, a first-floor loading door at the other, and two mullioned windows.	II
Gateway opposite kitchen gardens 53.38416°N 2.39654°W		c. 1750	The gateway is in a boundary wall. It has a rusticated surround with a flat head, a keystone, a cornice, and a parapet, and contains an ornate iron gate.	II
Manor Farmhouse, railings and gates 53.38807°N 2.41457°W		Mid-18th century	Originally built as a dower house, later a farmhouse, it is in brick on a stone plinth, and has a roof of slate and stone-slate. There are three storeys, three bays, a three-storey brewery wing to the left, and a rear porch. In the centre, approached by steps, is a recessed porch with a semi-elliptical head, and a door with a fanlight. The windows on the lower two floors are sashes with flat brick arches and stone sills, and on the top floor they are casements. At the top of the middle bay is a coped gablet containing a clock face. The wing has a hipped roof and mullioned windows. The garden forecourt has rusticated stone piers, and decorative wrought iron railings and gates.	II
Aviary; 53.37448°N 2.38681°W	—	18th century	The aviary is attached to Dunham Massey Lodge, it is in brick and has a slate roof with a stone-coped ridge. The aviary has an L-shaped plan and a cloister-like arrangement. The wings have six and two bays, and contain brick arches with stone keystones. Inside there are nesting boxes.	II
Big Tree House; 53.38450°N 2.39219°W		18th century	A brick house, partly roughcast, with a dentiled eaves cornice, and a coped parapet. There are two storeys with attics, a double-depth plan, two bays, and an outshut and 20th-century extension at the rear. On the front are two two-storey bow windows containing sashes separated by pilasters; the other windows are casements. The doorway is in the left gable end, and has pilasters, side lights, and a dentilled pediment.	II
Brick Kiln Lane Bridge; 53.38237°N 2.40726°W		18th century	The bridge carries Brickkiln Lane over a mill stream. It is in stone and consists of a single segmental arch that has keystones with herringbone decoration. The bridge has a band, and low parapets with chamfered copings.	II
Dunham Massey Lodge; 53.37444°N 2.38703°W	—	18th century	Two houses, the later house added in the 19th century, they are in brick with slate roofs, two storeys, and a total of six bays. The older house has a stone plinth, and timber cornices over both floors. It was refaced in the 19th century with the addition of two two-storey canted bay windows and a flat-roofed porch with Tuscan pillars. The later house has sash windows and a hipped roof.	II
Obelisk; 53.38808°N 2.40364°W		18th century	The obelisk in Whiteoaks Wood is in line with the drive from Dunham Massey Hall, providing a feature in the view from the house. It is in sandstone, and consists of a tall shaft on a stepped plinth.	II
Slaughterhouse; 53.37967°N 2.39233°W		18th century	The slaughterhouse in the grounds of Dunham Massey Hall is in brick with stone dressings, and has a stone-slate roof with coped gables. It has two storeys, and one room in each floor. There is one doorway and two windows on each side, all with flat brick arches.	II
Barn Cottages; 53.38265°N 2.40192°W		Before 1751	A barn that was later converted into two cottages, it is in brick, and has a 20th-century tiled roof with coped gables. The original cart entries, with quoins, and the vents have been blocked. The cottages have two storeys and central doorways. Most of the windows are sashes, with a casement window in the left bay.	II
The Village Farmhouse and gatepiers 53.38840°N 2.41487°W		1752	A brick farmhouse with a slate roof, two storeys with an attic, a double-depth plan, and three bays. The central doorway has a moulded surround, a keystone and a fanlight, and the windows are casements with cambered brick arches, keystones and stone sills. Above the central window on the upper floor is a datestone. The enclosure in front of the house includes rusticated gate piers with elaborate urns.	II
Dunham School; 53.38949°N 2.39227°W		1759	The school was considerably extended to the north in about 1860 and again in the 20th century. The original part is in brick, partly rendered, and has a slate roof. It has two storeys, three bays. The central doorway and the window to the right have segmental heads with keystones, and the left window is a replacement. Above the door is a small gable containing a circular inscribed panel.	II
1 and 2 Greenbank; 53.38747°N 2.41620°W		Late 18th century	Originally one house, later divided into two, it is in brick on a stone plinth, and has a slate roof. There are two storeys, three bays, and single-storey flanking wings, with the doors on the sides. The windows are sashes with keystone wedge lintels, and above the doorways are 19th-century canopies.	II
Orchard View; 53.38715°N 2.41542°W		Late 18th century	Originally two cottages, later combined into one, it is in brick with a slate roof. There are two storeys, originally with a single-depth plan, and later extended to the rear. The doorway and windows have cambered brick arches, and the windows are casements.	II
Rose Cottage and Farm Cottage; 53.38388°N 2.39364°W		Late 18th century	Originally four cottages, later combined into two, in brick with a slate roof. They have two storeys, a double-depth plan, and at the rear is a continuous outshut. The doorways and windows, which are three-light casements with stone sills, have segmental heads.	II
Aqueduct and bridge 53.38328°N 2.40951°W		1776	The aqueduct carries the Bridgewater Canal over the River Bollin. The aqueduct and the adjoining bridge are in brick and stone, with repairs in concrete. They both have a segmental arch with a keystone, a band, and brick parapets with stone copings.	II
Dunham School Bridge; 53.38992°N 2.39270°W		1776	The bridge carries School Lane over the Bridgewater Canal. It is in brick with sandstone dressings, and consists of a single segmental arch with a band, copings on the parapet rising to an apex, and brick buttresses.	II
Willow Cottage; 53.38827°N 2.41635°W		Late 18th to early 19th century	A brick house with a slate roof, two storeys, two bays, and a left lean-to. In the centre is a decorative timber porch and a door with a fanlight. The windows on the front are sashes with stone sills and wedge lintels, and at the rear they are casements.	II
Farm buildings, Home Farm; 53.37385°N 2.38627°W	—	1822	The farm buildings form a quadrangle around the farmyard. They are in brick and have slate roofs. The south range has cart entries, honeycomb vents, pitching holes, and a first-floor door. In the east range is an arcade of ten arches with keystones, above each of which is a pitching hole. The other ranges have a stone plinth, doors, casement windows, and pitching holes.	II
Big Tree Cottages; 53.38449°N 2.39293°W		Early 19th century	A row of three brick cottages with a double-depth plan, two storeys and four bays. There are two doorways on the front and one in the right gable end. The doorways and the windows, which are casements, have cambered brick arches.	II
Dog Farmhouse; 53.38475°N 2.39253°W		Early 19th century	The farmhouse is in brick with a slate roof, two storeys, a double-depth plan, two bays, and a rear wing. The central doorway has a 19th-century canopy, and the windows are sashes with stone sills and cambered brick heads.	II
Home Farm dovecote 53.37389°N 2.38652°W	—	Early 19th century	The dovecote in the centre of the farmyard is in brick on a stone plinth, with quoins, a sill band, and a slate roof. It has an octagonal plan and two storeys. On the ground floor is a door, above are circular dove holes, and on the roof is a cupola with an elaborate wrought iron weathervane. Inside are nesting holes set into the brickwork.	II
Sinderland House; 53.40261°N 2.39984°W	—	Early 19th century	A brick farmhouse, rendered at the front, on a plinth, with a sill band and a slate roof. There are two storeys with an attic, and three bays. The central doorway has a pitched hood, and the windows are sashes.	II
The Hollies; 53.39039°N 2.41384°W		Early 19th century	A brick house with a slate roof, two storeys, three bays, and a rear wing. In the centre is a doorway with pilasters and a radial fanlight, and the windows are sashes with stone sills and brick cambered arches.	II
Bollington Mill; 53.38023°N 2.40693°W		1860s	A former water-powered corn mill with an undershot wheel built over the River Bollin. It is in brick with a hipped slate roof, five storeys, five bays, and a left lean-to. The central bay projects slightly, and has a small gablet. The windows have rusticated jambs, segmental arches, and keystones. At the rear is an archway with rusticated voussoirs and a keystone over the mill leat.	II
Dunham Town war memorial 53.38751°N 2.39190°W		c. 1930	The war memorial is in the churchyard of St Mark's Church. It is in sandstone, and has a square base with ogee chamfering, a slightly tapering plinth with a moulded foot, and a cross with a square cross-section, slightly flared arms, and a laurel wreath between the arms. On the plinth are inscriptions and the names of those lost in the two World Wars.	II
