= William Grey, 9th Earl of Stamford =

English peer

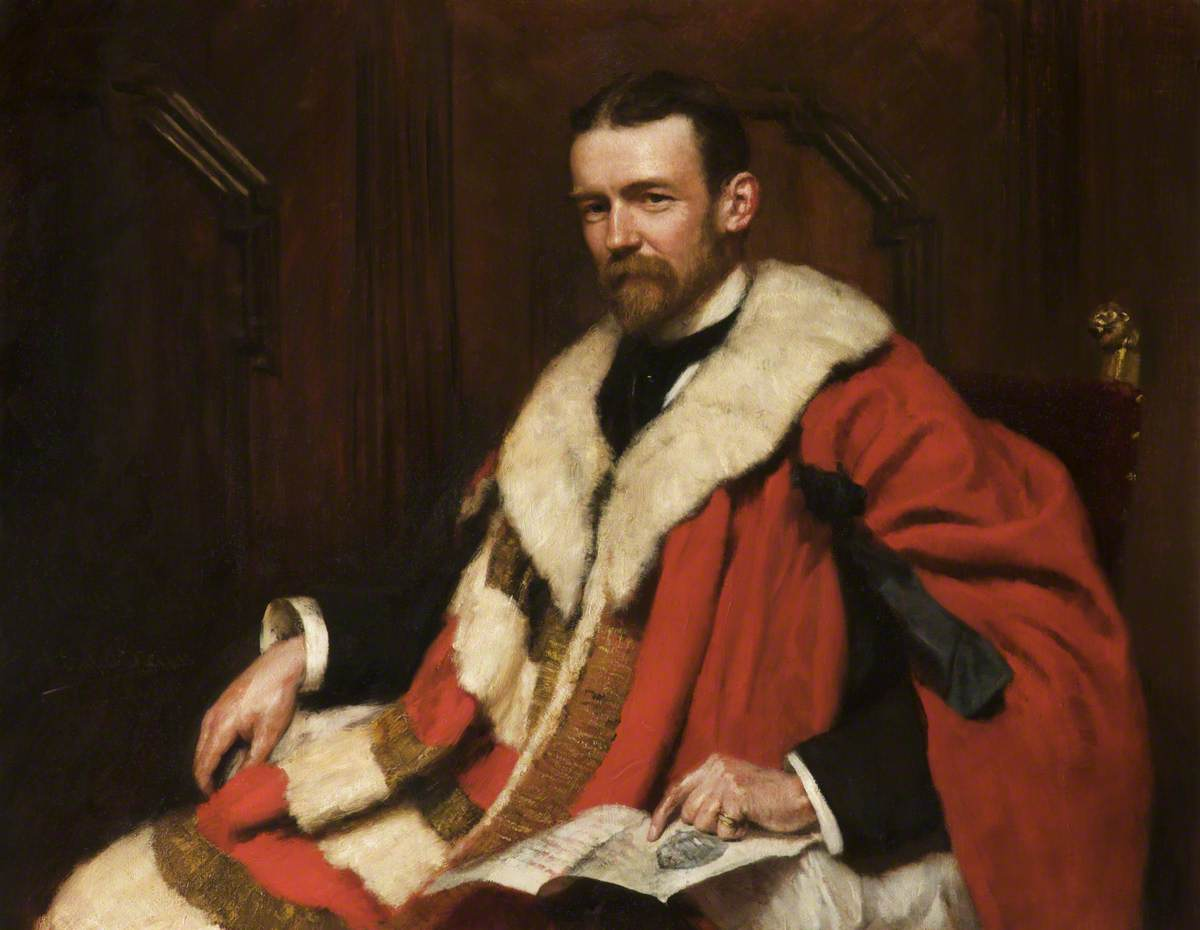
William Grey Portrait

William Grey, 9th Earl of Stamford (18 April 1850 – 24 May 1910) was an English peer.

== Biography ==
Grey was born in Newfoundland, the son of Revd. William Grey and Harriet White, educated at Exeter College, Oxford and, from 1878 to 1883, Professor of Classics and Philosophy at Codrington College in Barbados. He was married in London in 1895 to (Elizabeth Louisa) Penelope Theobald, daughter of the Revd. C. Theobald. They had a son and heir, Roger, in 1896 and a daughter, Jane, in 1899.

On the death of his first cousin Harry Grey, 8th Earl of Stamford in Africa in 1890, he inherited the titles of Earl of Stamford and Baron Grey of Groby and the 3,000-acre (12 km^{2}) estate at Dunham Massey in Cheshire. Following a delay whilst the House of Lords considered the legitimacy of the 8th earl's son's claim to the title, he moved in 1906 to Dunham Massey to take up residence in the remaining family seat, which had been empty for many years. Once there, he set about modernising the electrical and plumbing systems and redesigning the interiors with the help of the furniture historian and connoisseur Percy Macquoid.

He was a devout and philanthropic individual, serving as a vice-president of the Bible Society and, at one point, as a member of the Metropolitan Asylum Board and the council of the Metropolitan Hospital Fund.

On his death in 1910, he was succeeded by his son Roger Grey, 10th Earl of Stamford.

Peerage of England
Preceded by Harry Grey	Earl of Stamford; 1890–1910	Succeeded by Roger Grey
