= Andries Carpentière =

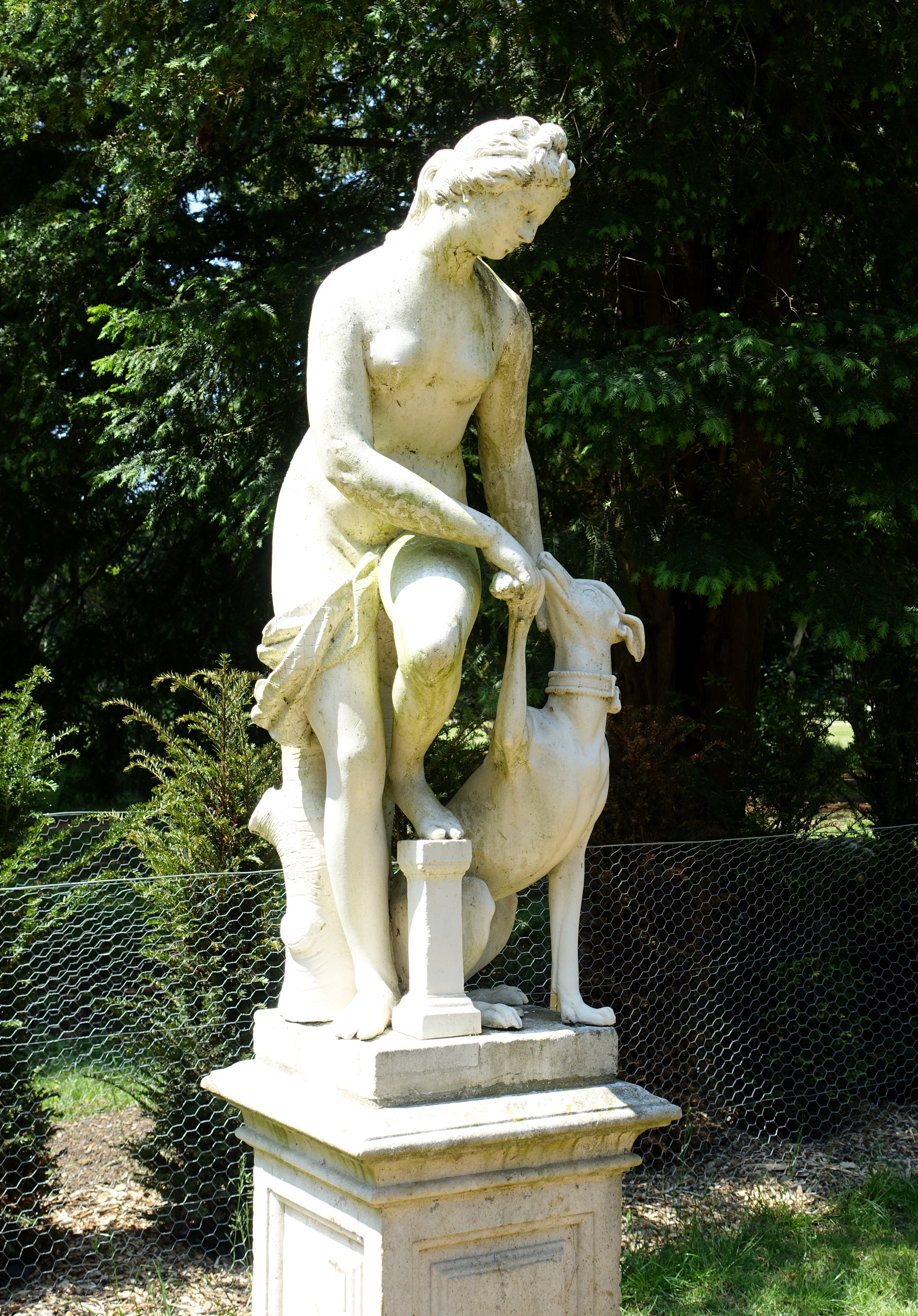
Diana by Andries Carpentière (Andrew Carpenter), at Wrest Park

Andries Carpentière or Charpentière (1672–1737) was an English sculptor of French or Flemish descent active in Britain in the early 18th century. His name is sometimes anglicised as Andrew Carpenter. He worked in both marble and lead.

== Biography ==
He was first recorded in London in 1702. For some years he worked as principal assistant to John Nost before setting up his own studio – by 1714 he had established a lead-statue-making business on Piccadilly and he produced several garden sculptures in that material. He worked at Cannons for James Brydges, 1st Duke of Chandos and at Wrest Park.

== Works ==
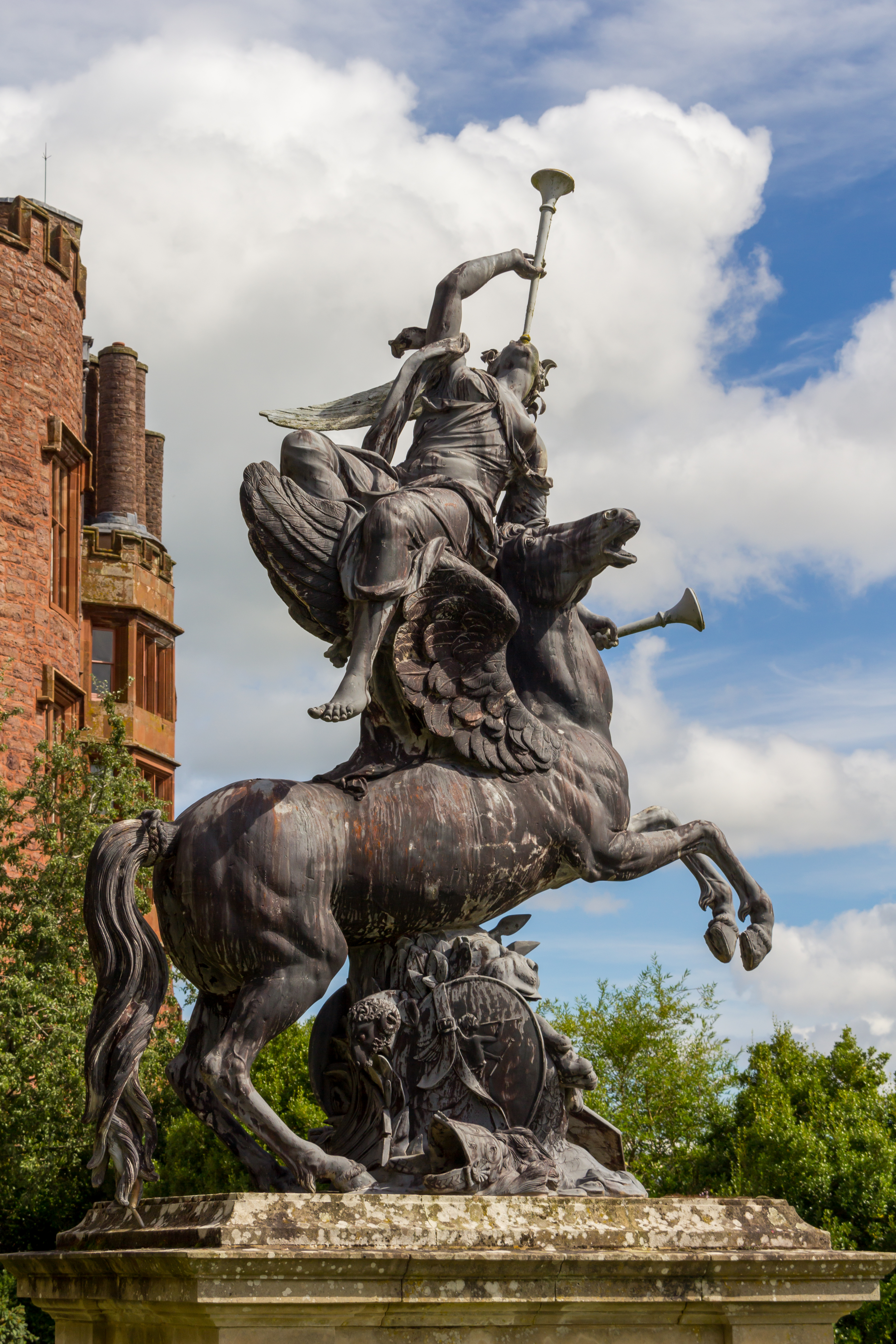
Fame at Powis Castle

- Venus – Lyme Park
- Fame – Powis Castle
- Tomb monument to Sir John Crewe (attributed) – St Helen's Church, Tarporley
- Meleager
- Tombs to the Booth family in St Mary's Church, Bowdon
