= George Booth, 2nd Earl of Warrington =

English peer and landowner

The Right Honourable George Booth
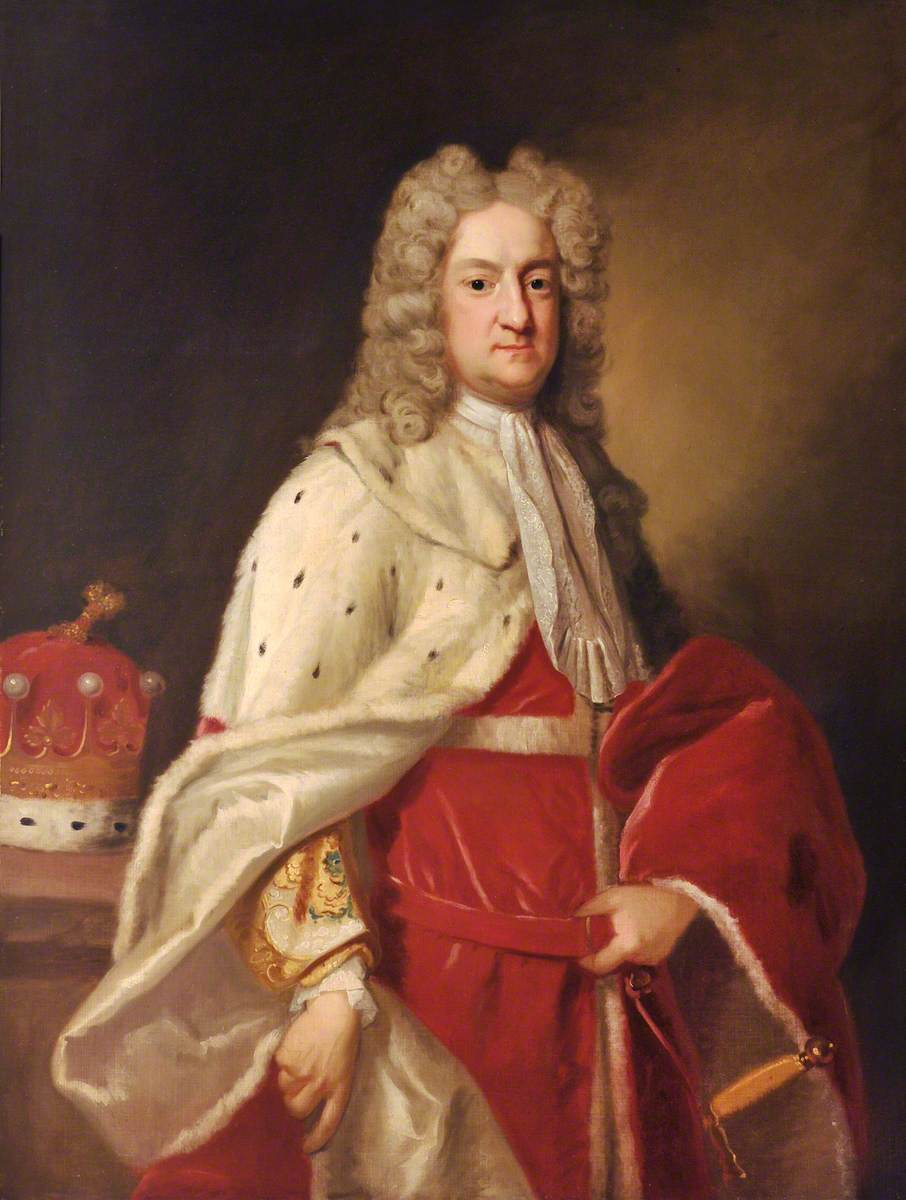
- Portrait by Michael Dahl, 1727
- Born: 2 May 1675; Mere Hall, Cheshire
- Died: 2 August 1758 (aged 83); Dunham Massey Hall, Cheshire
- Resting place: Church of St Mary the Virgin, Bowdon
- Spouse: Mary Oldbury
- Children: Mary Booth, Countess of Stamford
- Parents: Henry Booth, 1st Earl of Warrington (father); Mary Langham (mother)

George Booth, 2nd Earl of Warrington (2 May 1675 – 2 August 1758) was an English peer and landowner.

== Life ==
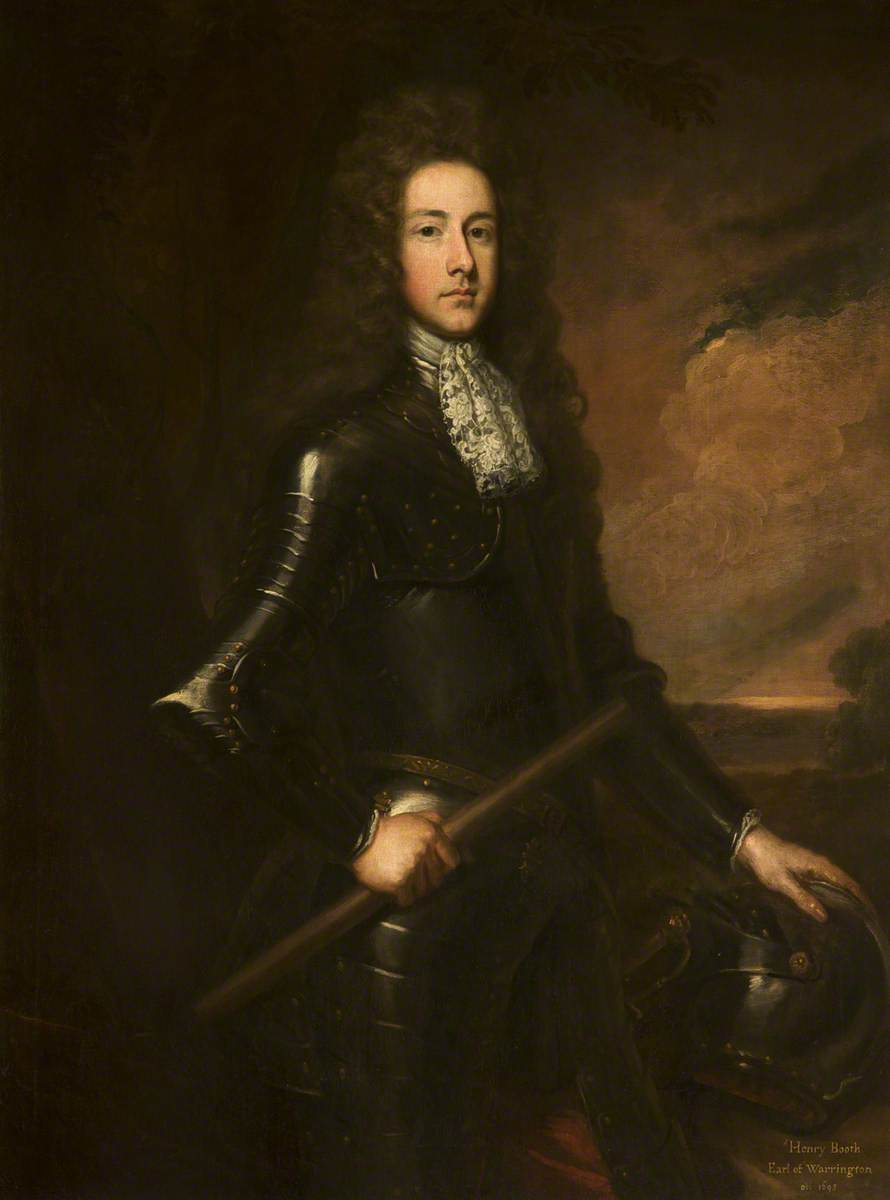
Portrait of Warrington's father Henry

Born at Mere Hall, Cheshire, on 2 May 1675, the second son of Henry Booth, 1st Earl of Warrington, by Mary Langham, daughter of Sir James Langham Bt, of Cottesbrooke, he was known by the courtesy title of Lord Delamer before succeeding to the family titles upon his father's death in 1694. Apart from being a renowned collector of silver plate, he received the appointment of Lord Lieutenant of Cheshire, another nobleman being nominated to discharge the duties during his minority.

In 1739, he wrote, Considerations upon the Institution of Marriage, with some thoughts concerning the force and obligation of the marriage contract, wherein is considered how far divorces may or may not be allowed, By a Gentleman. Humbly submitted to the judgment of the impartial. It is an argument in favour of divorce on the ground of incompatibility of temper. From other sources we learn that he had been convinced of the advisability of admitting this as a sufficient reason by his own unhappy experiences. Luttrell states that the lady had a fortune of £40,000, and Philip Bliss, in a manuscript note in a copy of Walpole's Royal and Noble Authors, now in the British Museum, adds:

Some few years after my lady had consign'd up her whole fortune to pay my lord's debts, they quarrelled, and lived in the same house as absolute strangers to each other at bed and hoard.

Of the earl and his lady there is an unflattering description in a letter by Mrs. Bradshaw, printed in Letters to and from Henrietta, Countess of Suffolk (1824), i. 97:

The Earl and Countess of Warrington, met us, which to me quite spoiled the feast; she is a limber dirty fool, and he the stiffest of all stiff things.

Besides his pamphlet on divorce the earl was the author of a letter to the writer of the "Present State of the Republic of Letters", vindicating his father from the reflections against him in Burnet's History of his own Time. Warrington died on 2 August 1758, and was buried in the Booth Chapel, the family vault, at Bowdon Church, 3 miles (4.8 km) from Dunham Massey Hall.

== Family ==
In 1702, Lord Warrington married Mary Oldbury, daughter of Sir John Oldbury, a City merchant, of St Dunstan's in the East, who later made his fortune from selling insurance to ships that trafficked enslaved people from Africa to the Americas, her mother was his wife, Mary Bohun. Mary, Countess of Warrington, died in 1740, having given birth to an only child, their daughter and heiress, Lady Mary Booth, who married in 1736 Henry Grey, 4th Earl of Stamford, who inherited the estates in Cheshire and Lancashire. Upon his death, the earldom of Warrington became extinct, whilst the other family titles of Baron Delamer and the baronetcy, created in 1611, devolved upon his cousin, Nathaniel Booth.

Their only daughter, Lady Mary Booth, became the Countess of Stamford upon marrying Henry Grey, 4th Earl of Stamford, and she inherited all the Booth estates, including Dunham Massey Hall and Staley Hall. Their son, George Grey, 5th Earl of Stamford, was recreated in 1796 Earl of Warrington in addition to the Stamford title, the family being known as Earls of Stamford and Warrington (until the death in 1905 of the dowager Countess Katharine, widow of George Grey, 7th Earl of Stamford).

== See also ==
- Booth baronets
- Dunham Massey Hall
- Peter Archambo

== Sources ==
- Collins Peerage
- Burke's Peerage (1970 edition), q.v. Stamford, E
- The BBC – George Booth, 2nd Earl of Warrington, 16 April 2012
- George Booth (1675–1758), 2nd Earl of Warrington, BBC Paintings
- THE ARMS OF BOOTH QUARTERING OTHERS, FOR GEORGE, 2ND EARL OF WARRINGTON (1675–1758), Christie's

Peerage of England
Preceded by Henry Booth	Earl of Warrington; 1st creation 1694–1758	Extinct
Preceded by Henry Booth	Baron Delamer; 1st creation 1694–1758	Succeeded by Nathaniel Booth
