= John Nost =

Flemish sculptor

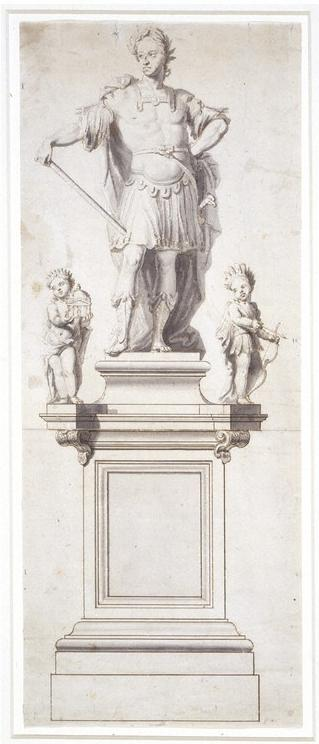
Preparatory drawing by Jan van Nost for a statue of William III & II, now in the Victoria & Albert Museum

John Nost (Dutch: Jan van Nost) (died 1729) was a Flemish sculptor who worked in England in the late 17th and early 18th centuries.

== Life ==
Originally from Mechelen in what is now Belgium, he moved to England in the second half of the 17th century, gaining employment with the sculptor Arnold Quellin as a foreman. After Quellin's death in 1686, Nost married his widow, and established his own sculptural works business in the Haymarket district of London.

He was prolific and received many commissions, including at Hampton Court Palace, Melbourne Hall, Castle Howard, Buckingham Palace, and Chatsworth. Many of his statues were cast in lead.

Van Nost died at his home at Hyde Park in London on 26 April 1729.

== Apprentices and collaborators ==
Van Nost was heavily involved with other well-known sculptors of the day. He trained Andrew Carpenter, and his own nephew John van Nost the younger; his nephew moved to Ireland following his uncle's death and became a leading sculptor there.

Several well-known sculptors had their premises near Nost at the Haymarket and it is known that he collaborated with many of them. For example, he worked on a commission with Richard Osgood for Hampton Court in 1701.

== Notable works ==
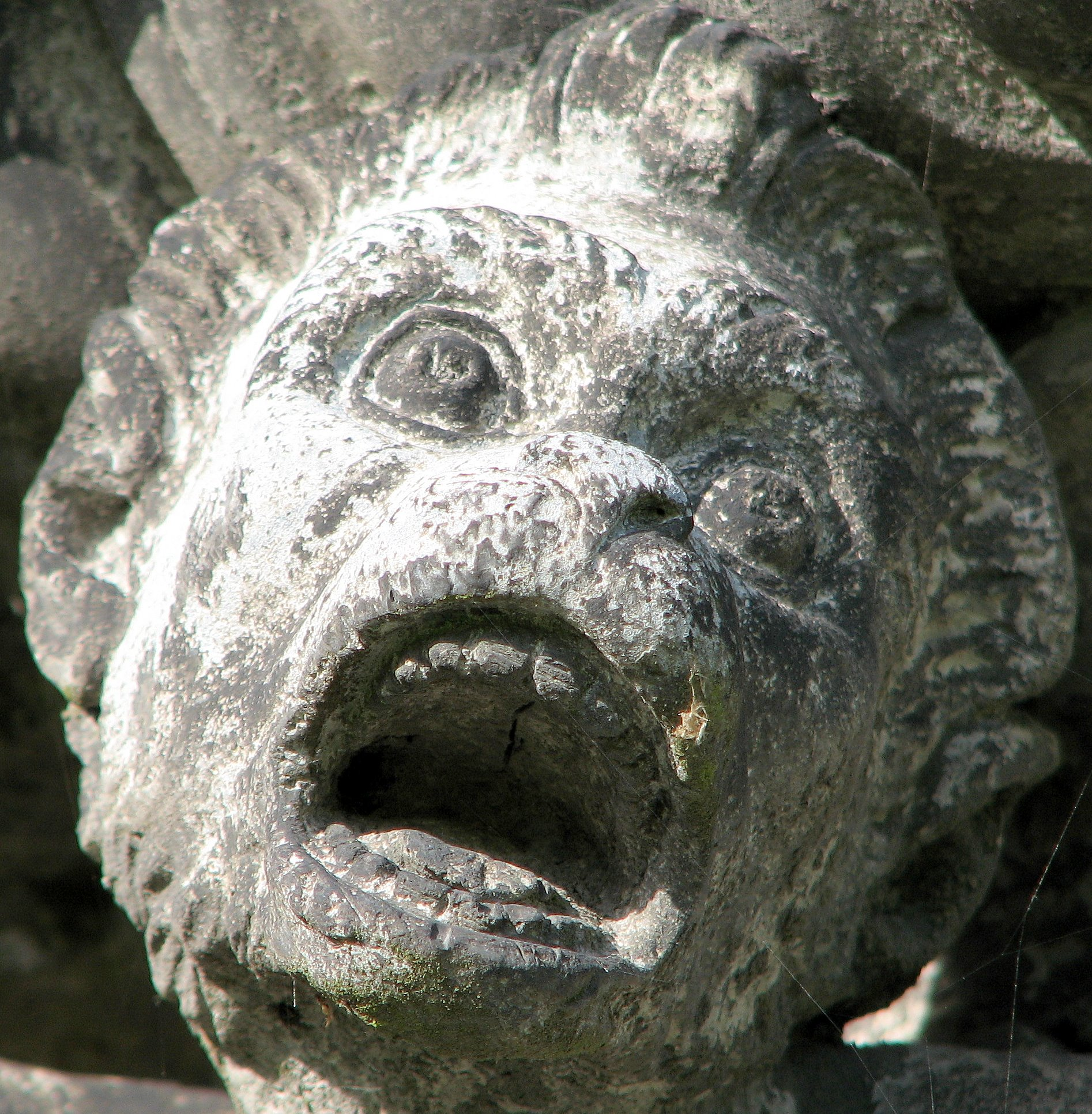
Detail of a figure on the Vase of the Seasons in the gardens of Melbourne Hall

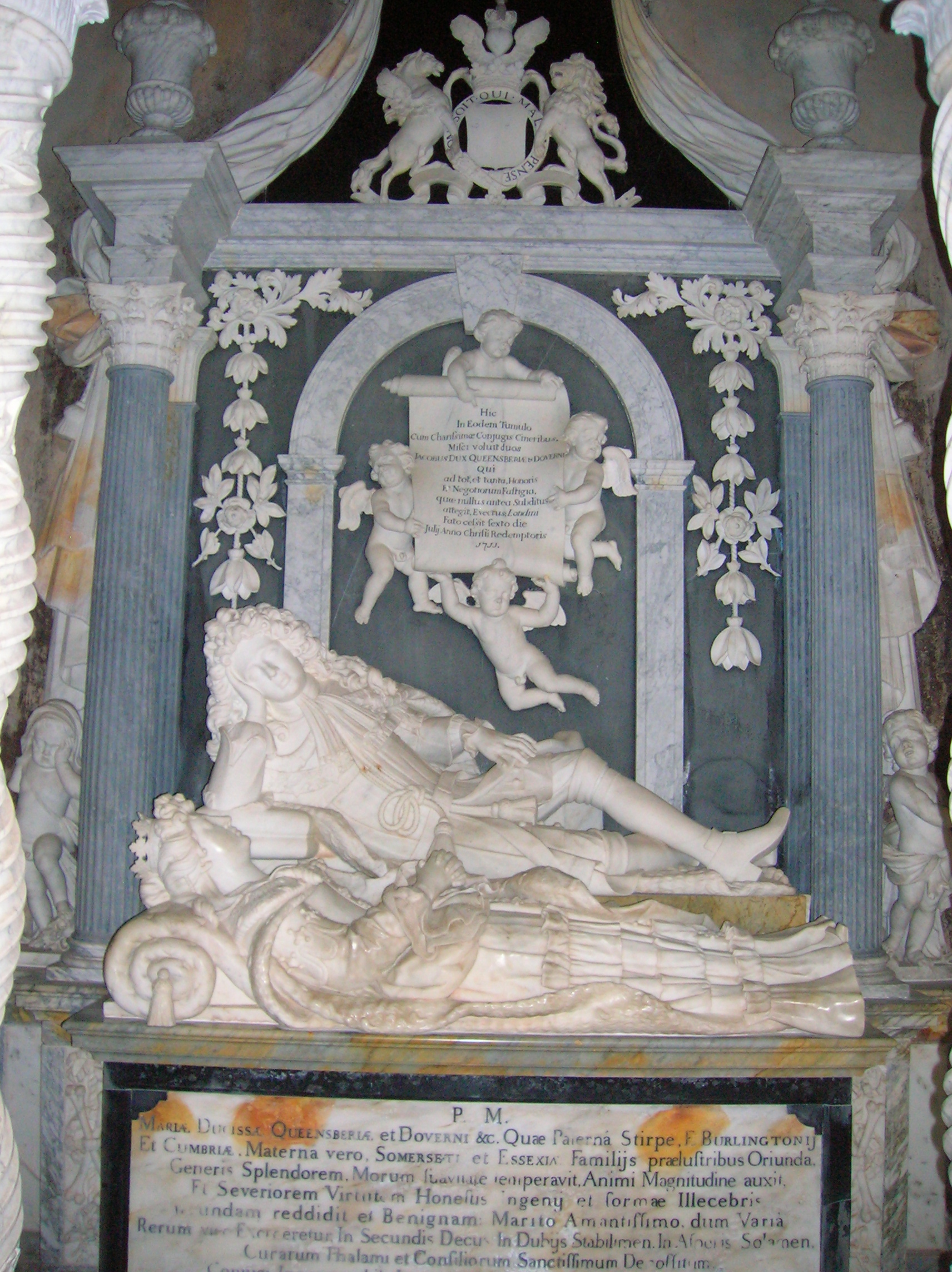
Monument to James Douglas, 2nd Duke of Queensberry, and his wife Mary at Durisdeer (1711)

Source: Dictionary of British Sculptors, 1660–1851, Rupert Gunnis.

- Statue of Sir Hugh Wyndham (judge) at Silton, Dorset (1692)
- Figures of a Boy and Girl, Chatsworth House (1698)
- Monument to John Digby, 3rd Earl of Bristol, Sherborne, Dorset (1698)
- Pair of amorini, Melbourne Hall (1699) for his patron, Thomas Coke
- Fireplace for Thomas Coke's London house on St James Place (1699)
- Various mythological figures for the gardens of Melbourne Hall (1700)
- Coat of Arms on entrance piers, fireplaces and marble tables, Hampton Court (1700)
- Flower Pot Gates, Hampton Court (1700)
- Statues of King William III and Queen Mary, Royal Exchange, London, (c.1700)
- Fountains at Hampton Court (1701–2)
- Multiple fireplaces for Melbourne Hall (1701–7)
- The Crouching Venus, Umberslade Hall (1702)
- Multiple garden figures for Castle Howard (1703–10)
- Statues within the pediment of Buckingham Palace (1705)
- Vase of the Seasons, Melbourne Hall (1705)
- Font at Collegiate Church of St Mary, Warwick (1705)
- Fountains and figures for Stonyhurst House (1705–1716)
- Monument to James Douglas, 2nd Duke of Queensberry, Durisdeer Church, Dumfriesshire (1711)
- Garden figures, Stourhead House (c.1714)
- Garden figures for Moulsham Hall (1717) (for Humphrey Mildmay)
- Equestrian Statue Of George I for Essex Bridge, Dublin (1717) (moved to Barber Institute of Fine Arts, Birmingham 1937)
- Garden figures for Rousham House (c.1719)
- Statue of Queen Mary for University College, Oxford (1720)
- Garden figures for Seaton Delaval Hall (c.1720)
- Garden figures for Chirk Castle (c.1720)
- Statue of Sir Robert Geffrye for the almshouses at Shoreditch (1723) (original now at Mottingham with a replica at the almshouses)
- Statue of George II for Cannons House (c.1724) (moved in 1753 to create a centre-piece for Golden Square in London)
- Two large vases for Wrest Park (1725) for the Duke of Kent
- Statue of George I for Grosvenor Square, London (1726) (stolen 1838)
- Garden figures for Boreham House (c.1728)
