= Fountains in the United Kingdom =

== English country house fountains ==
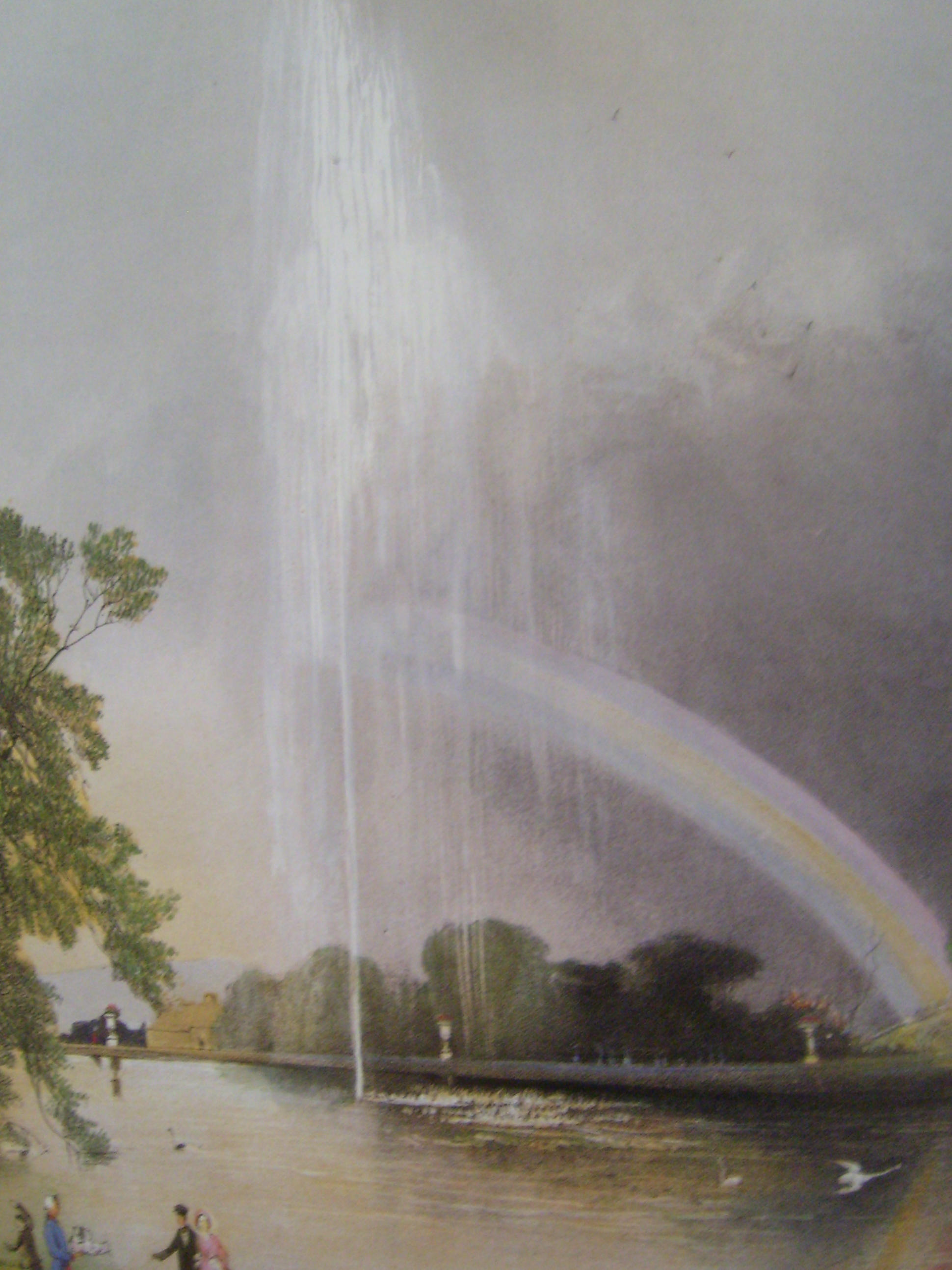
The Great Fountain, Enville (1857)

Fountains became a decorative feature of the English country house as early as the end of the 17th century. These baroque fountains were influenced by the fountains of the Italian Renaissance garden and the Garden à la française, particularly the fountains of Versailles. Chatsworth House in Derbyshire featured a cascade and fountains (1696-1703) in the style of French baroque gardens. It had a seahorse fountain and a willow tree fountain, which sprayed water on unsuspecting visitors.

In 1843 William Cavendish, 6th Duke of Devonshire, the owner of Chatworth House, learned that Tsar Nicholas I of Russia was planning to visit his home. To mark the occasion, the Duke commissioned his gardener Joseph Paxton to construct the world's highest fountain on his estate. Paxton built an eight-acre lake as a reservoir for the fountain, 350 feet above the level of the fountain, to provide water pressure. The Emperor Fountain was finished in just six months, and could jet water 296 feet high. Unfortunately the Tsar never came to see fountain, but it still functions today.

In the nineteenth century, the development of steam engines allowed the construction of more dramatic fountains. In the middle of the century the Earl of Stamford built the Great Fountain, Enville, which jetted water 150 feet above the surface of a lake on his estate. He used two steam engines to pump water to a reservoir at the top of the hill above his estate. The fountain could spout water for several minutes, until the reservoir was empty.

In the early 21st Century, Lord Neidpath (later Earl of Wemyss and March) commissioned a giant, gravity-fed fountain at his family's ancestral home of Stanway House, in the Cotswolds. The fountain is driven by two reservoirs over a mile from the canal in the gardens of the house, and the custom-made bronze nozzle in the lake can produce a plume of water 300 feet (91 m) tall. The fountain is the tallest in Britain - seconded by the Perseus and Andromeda Fountain, Witley Court, at 121 feet (37 m); the tallest gravity-fed fountain in the world - seconded by the Fountain of Fame at the Royal Palace of La Granja de San Ildefonso, Segovia, Spain at 154 feet (47 m); and the second tallest fountain of any kind in Europe - only exceeded by the 400 feet (120 m)-high Jet d'Eau (driven by turbine) in Lake Geneva.

== London fountains ==
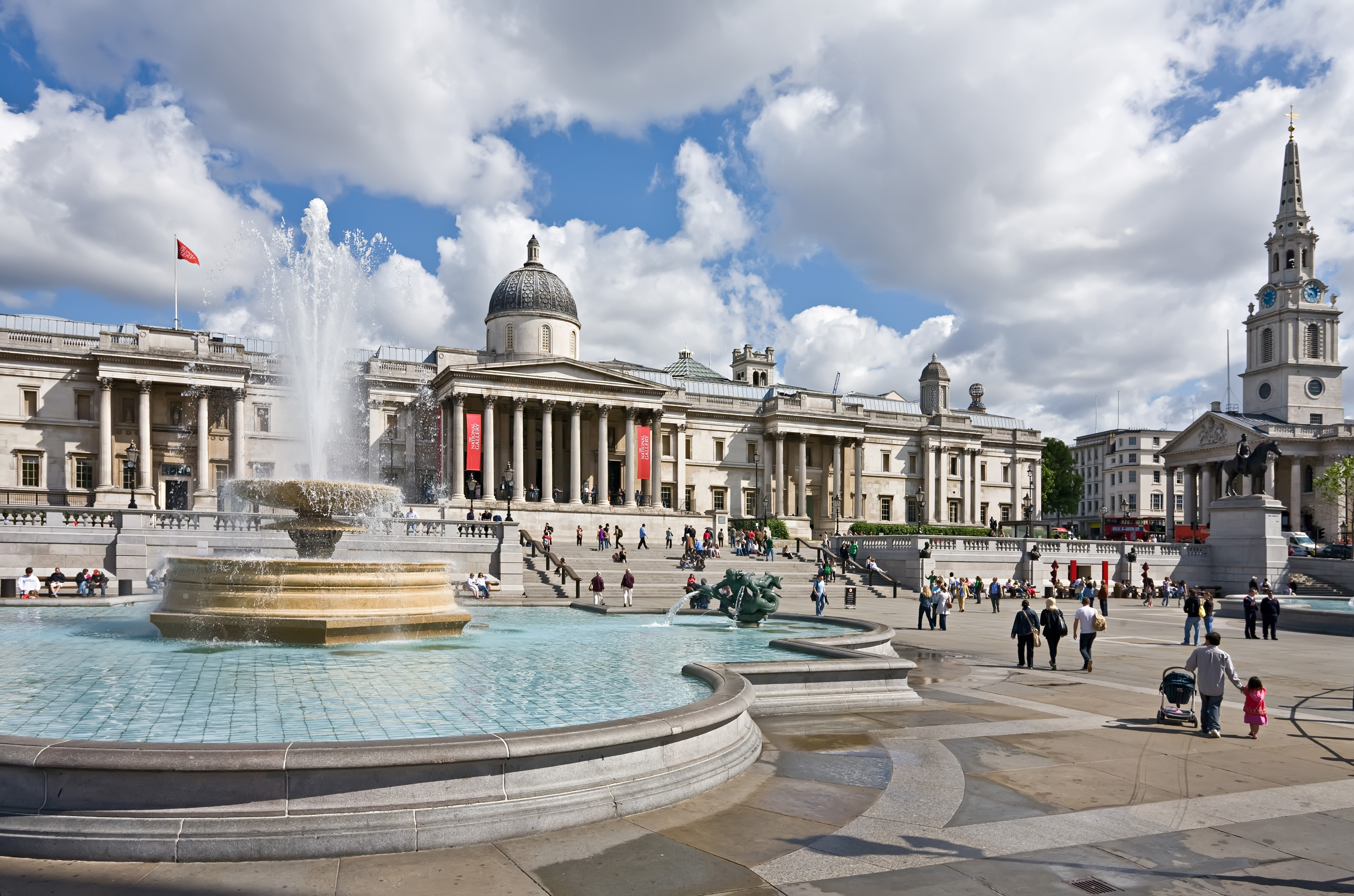
Fountain in Trafalgar Square, (1845)

In the 19th century, major European cities, led by London and Paris, began to use aqueducts, artesian wells and steam pumps to supply drinking water directly to homes. Fountains gradually ceased to be sources of drinking water and became public monuments in city squares and parks, honouring national heroes and events.

The fountains in Trafalgar Square were not part of the original design of the square, which was created beginning in 1826 to commemorate the victory of Lord Nelson over the fleet of Napoleon Bonaparte 1805. The fountains were added in 1845 by architect Charles Barry, famous for designing the Houses of Parliament, to break up the vast open space of the square and also to reduce the space available for unruly street demonstrations. The fountains were powered by a steam engine behind the National Gallery, which pumped water that came from an Artesian Well.

The original fountains were replaced in 1938-47 with two new fountains designed by Sir Edwin Lutyens, with sculptures by Sir Charles Wheeler and William McMillian, as monuments to two British naval heroes of the First World War, Lord John Jellicoe and Lord David Beatty. They were rebuilt again, with new pumps and lighting, in 2009.

The Shaftesbury Memorial Fountain in Piccadilly Circus, London by Alfred Gilbert, features an aluminium statue of Anteros representing "The Angel of Christian Charity." It was built in 1893 to honour the British philanthropist Lord Shaftesbury, but instead it scandalised Londoners, who thought it was a statue of Eros.

== Exposition fountains ==
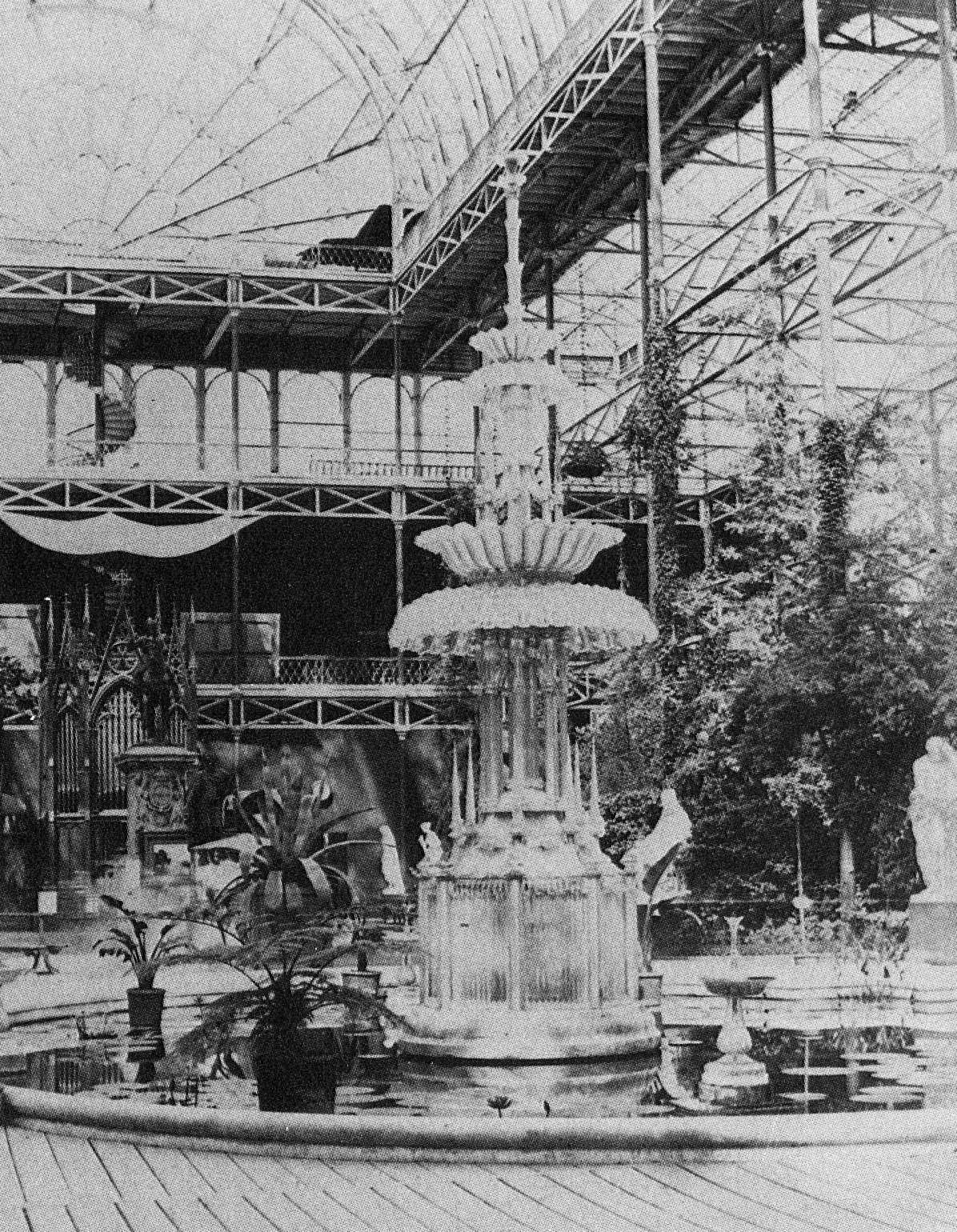
The Crystal Fountain at the Crystal Palace, London Great Exhibition of 1851.

In the 19th century, international expositions in London and Paris introduced fountains using new materials and technologies. The Crystal Fountain was the first of these fountains. Designed by Follett Osler, it was the world's first glass fountain, made of four tons of pure crystal glass. It was displayed in the central court of the Crystal Palace of the London Great Exhibition of 1851. It was destroyed by fire, along with the Crystal Palace, in 1936. The Art Journal Illustrated Catalogue of the Great Exhibition wrote in 1851 that the fountain was "perhaps the most striking object in the exhibition; the lightness and beauty, as well as the perfect novelty of the design, have rendered it the theme of admiration with all visitors. The ingenuity with which this has been effected is very perfect; it is supported by bars of iron, which are so completely embedded in the glass shafts, as to be invisible, and in no degree interfering with the purity and crystalline effect of the whole object.

== Gallery of notable fountains in the United Kingdom ==
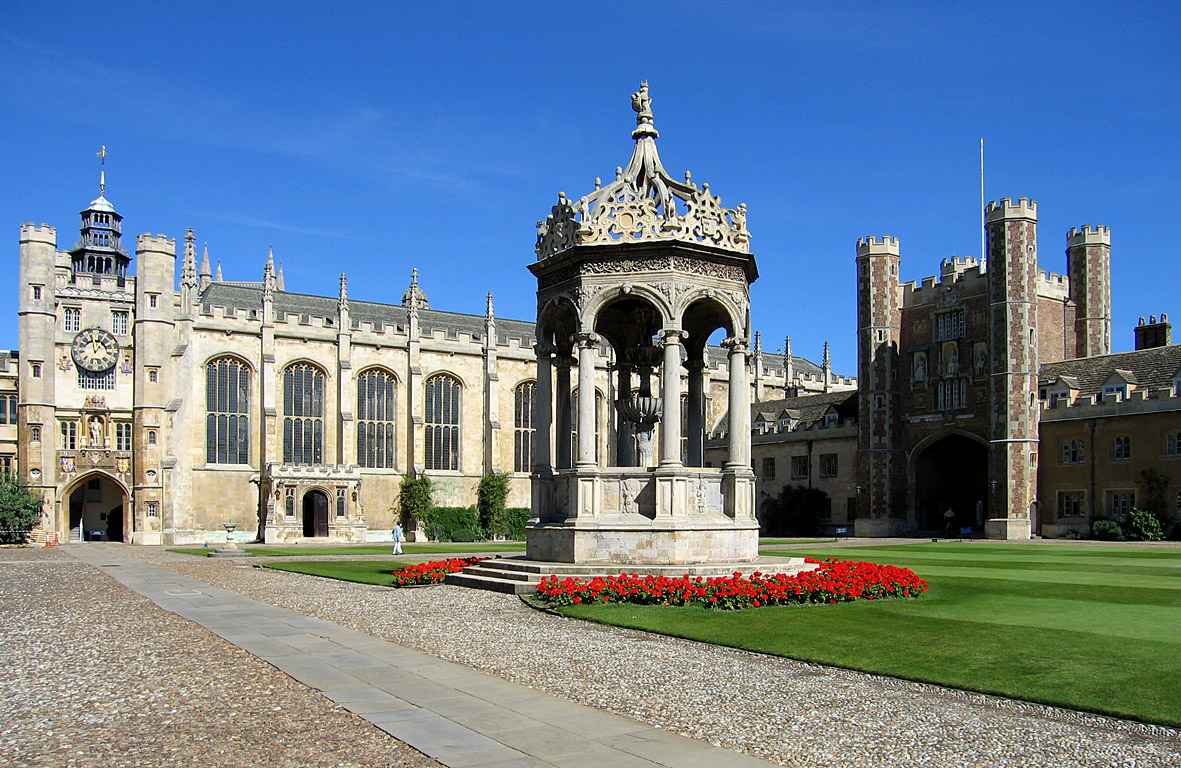
The fountain in the Great Court of Trinity College, Cambridge in the University of Cambridge. The Great Court was constructed between 1599 and 1608.

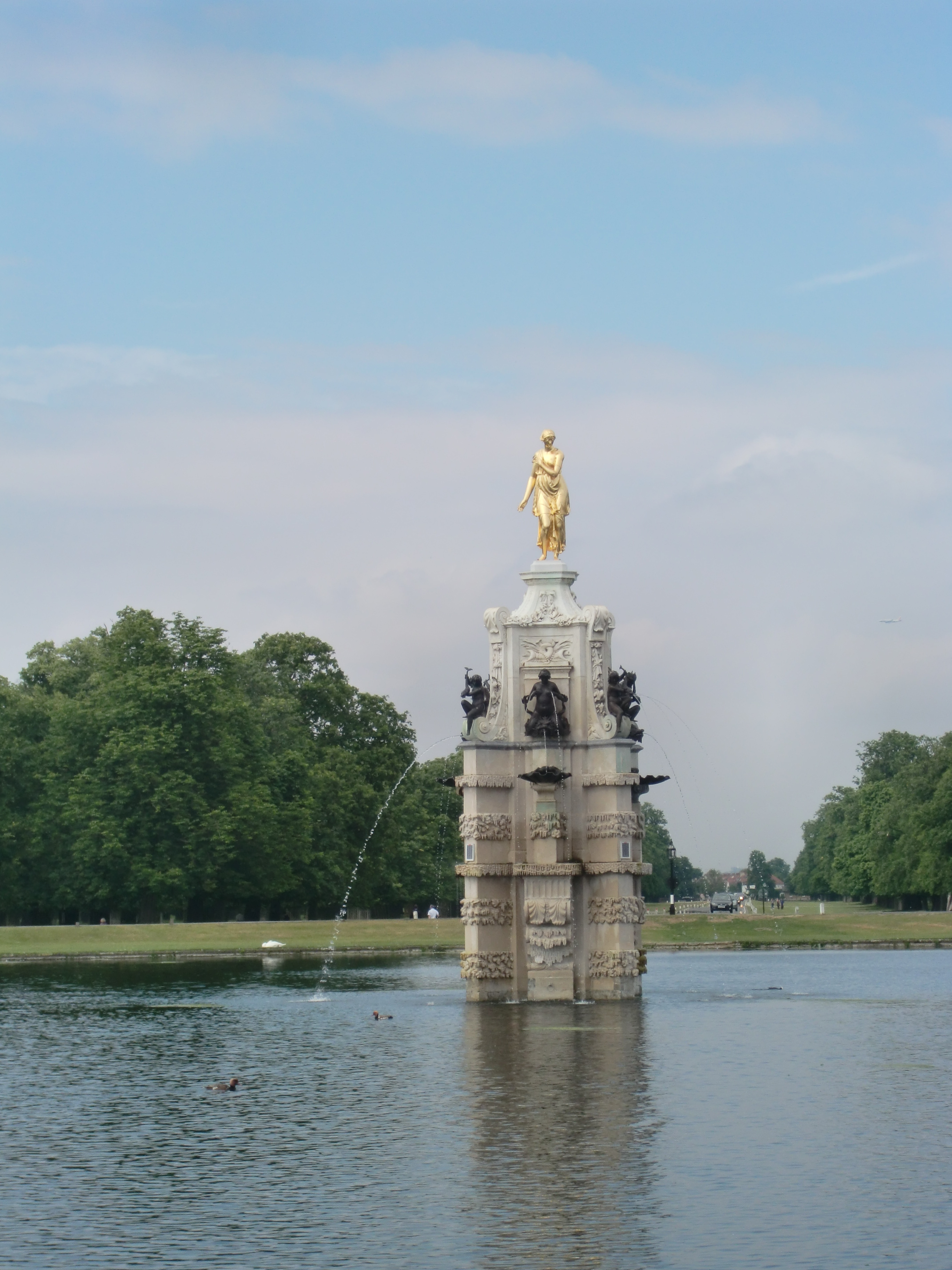
The Diana Fountain, Bushy Park has statuary commissioned in the 1630s by Charles I, and a design probably by Inigo Jones. The fountain was redesigned and relocated to its present site near the entrance of Hampton Court Palace in 1713.

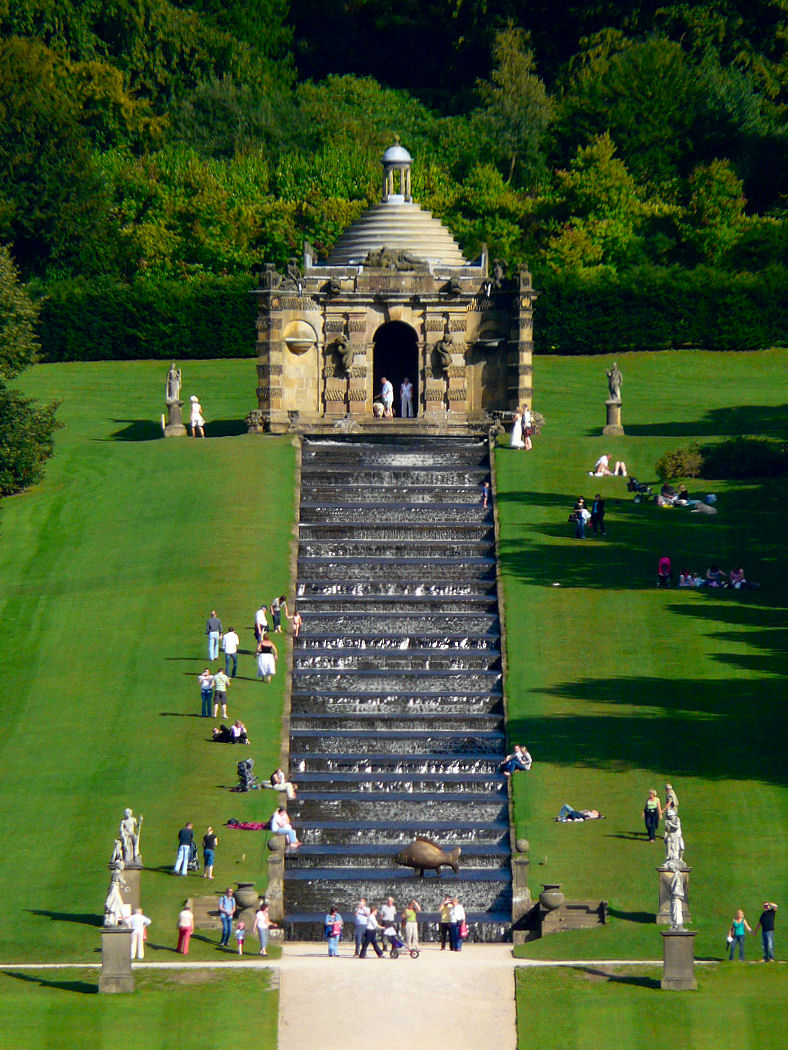
Cascade House at Chatsworth House, Derbyshire (1696-1703)

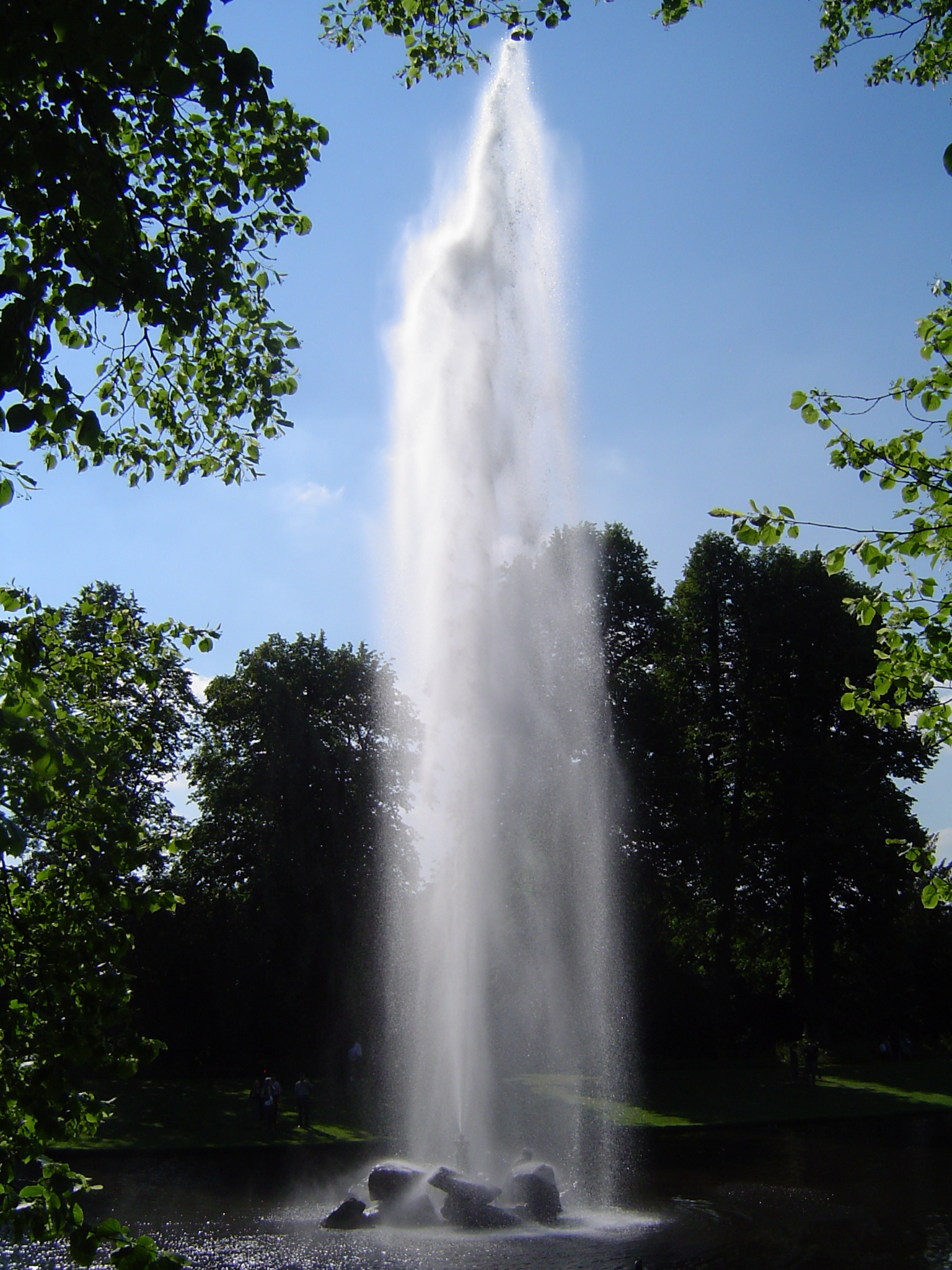
The Emperor Fountain, Chatsworth House, Derbyshire (1843) was built for a visit of Tsar Nicholas I of Russia which never took place. It could jet water upward 296 feet.

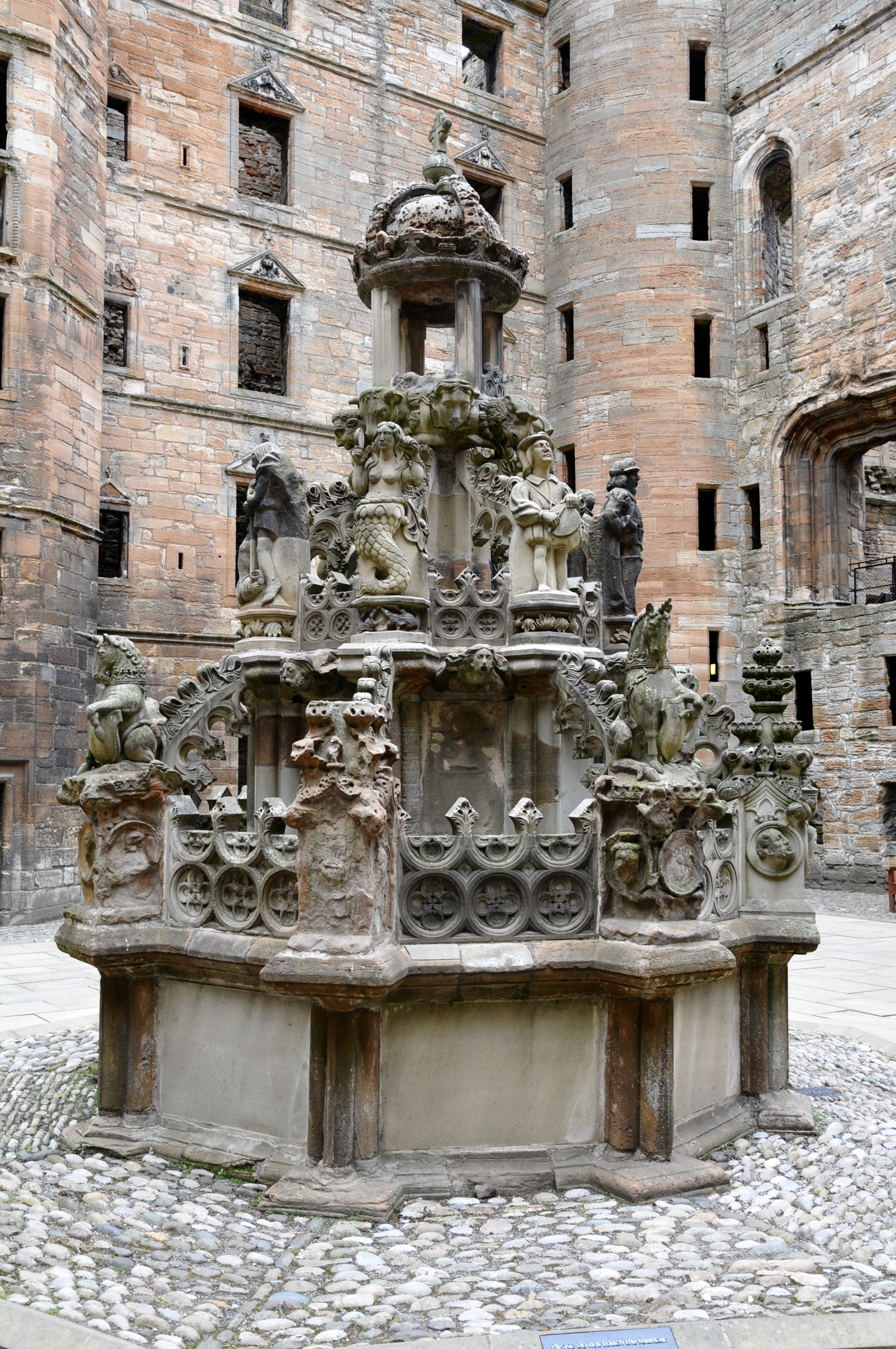
Linlithgow Palace has as its centrepiece the oldest working fountain in Britain, dating from 1537 and said to flow with wine when Bonnie Prince Charlie stayed here in 1745

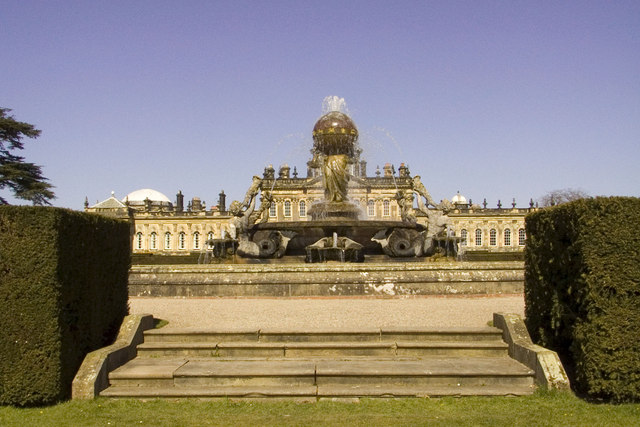
Atlas Fountain by John Thomas opened in 1853 at Castle Howard

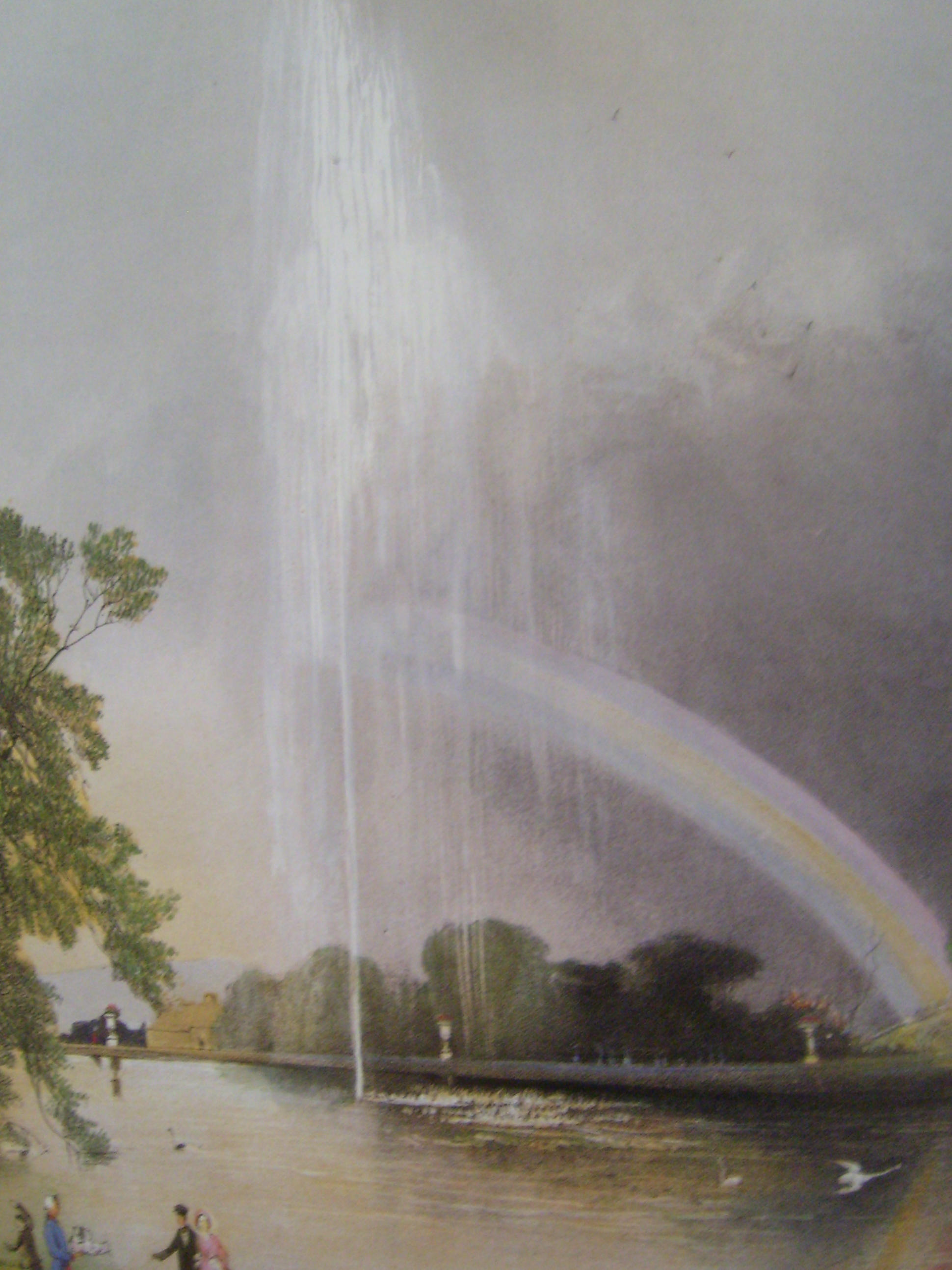
The Great Fountain, Enville (1857). Fed by a hilltop reservoir, it jetted water upwards 150 feet for the duration of a few minutes.

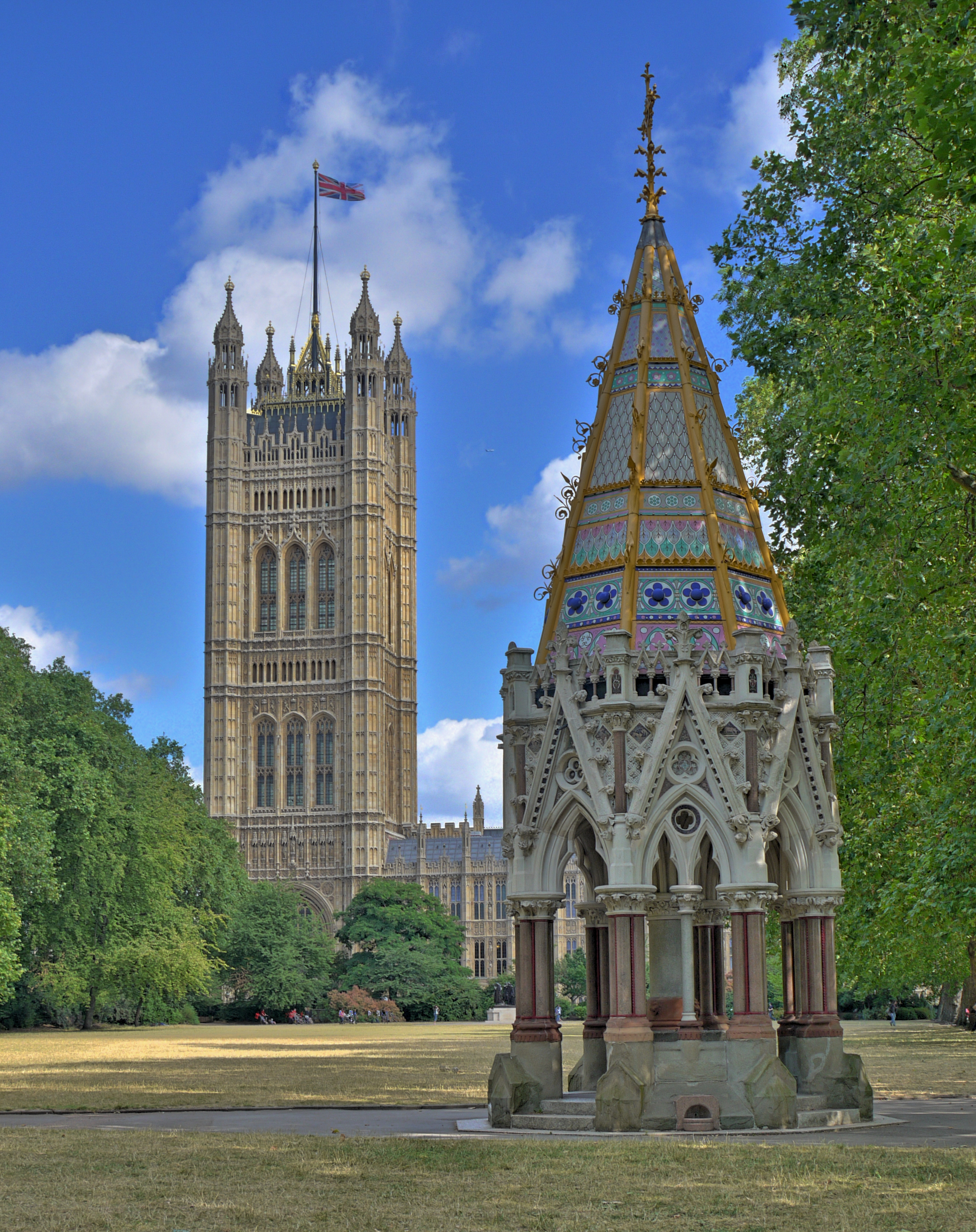
The Buxton Memorial Fountain in London (1865) commemorates the emancipation of the slaves in the British Empire in 1834.

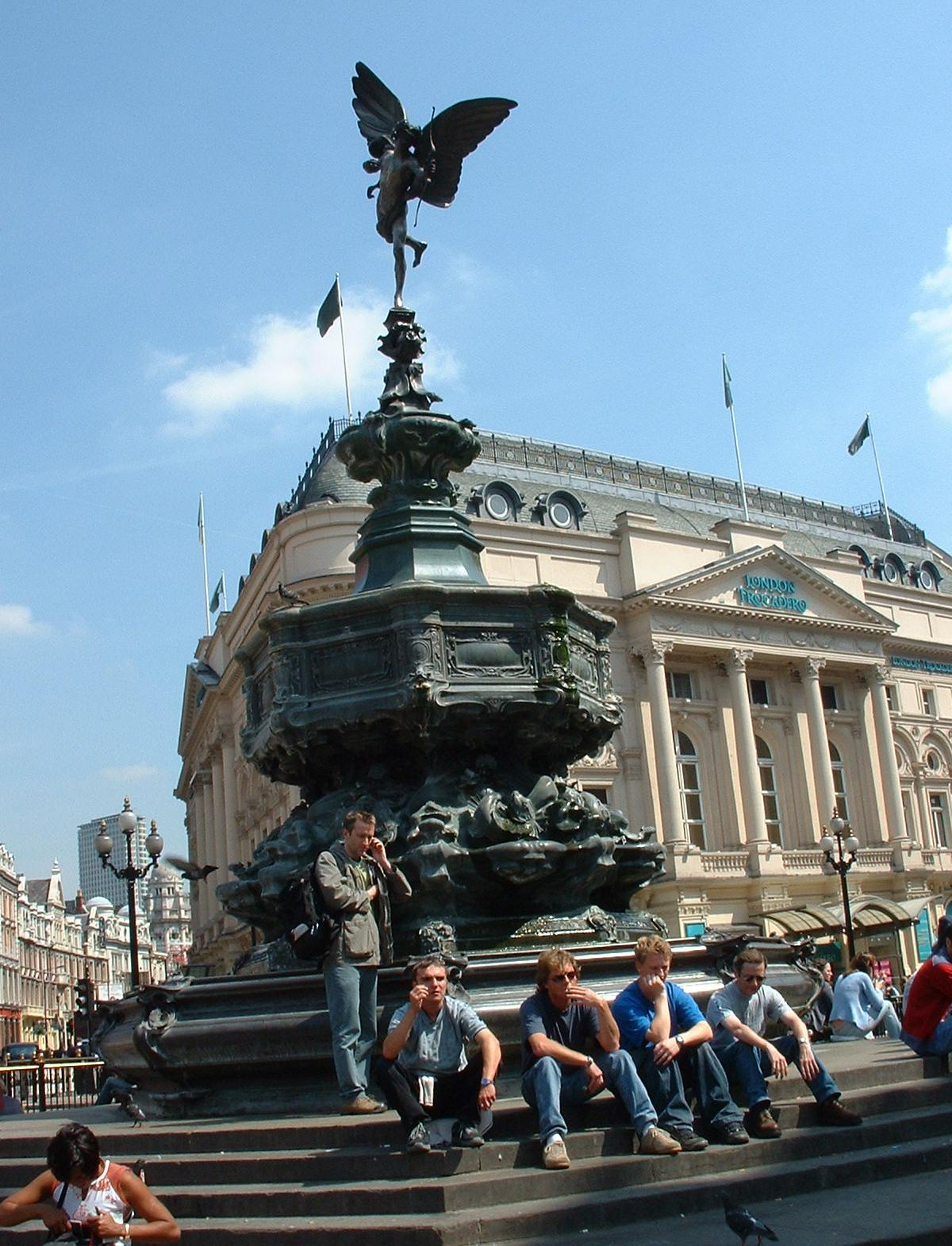
The Shaftesbury Memorial Fountain in Piccadilly Circus, London. (1893), features an aluminium statue of Anteros representing "The Angel of Christian Charity." It was built to honour the British philanthropist Lord Shaftesbury,

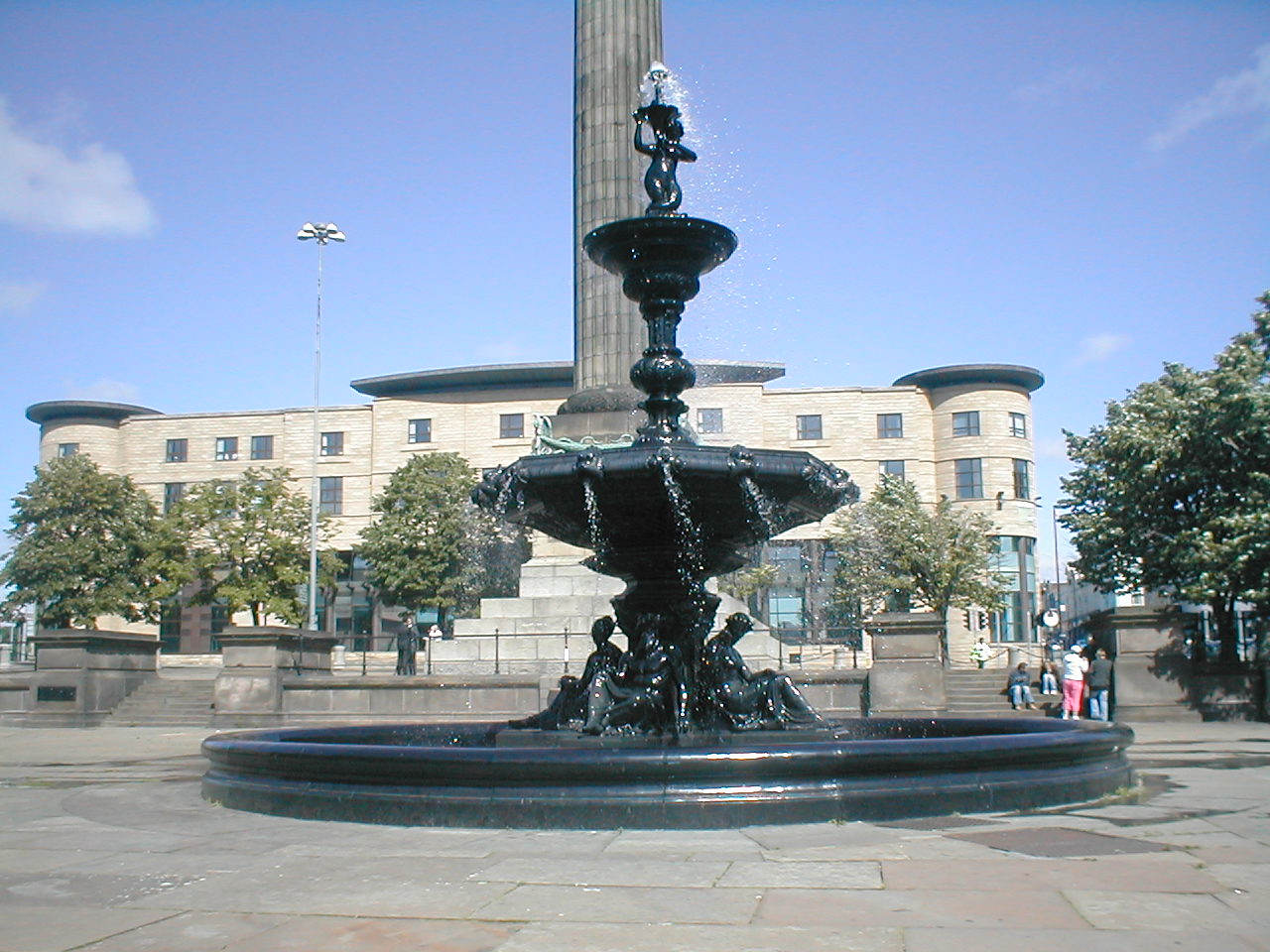
The Steble Fountain (1877) in William Brown Street, Liverpool, England, was a gift to the city from Colonel R.F Steble, who was a Mayor of Liverpool.

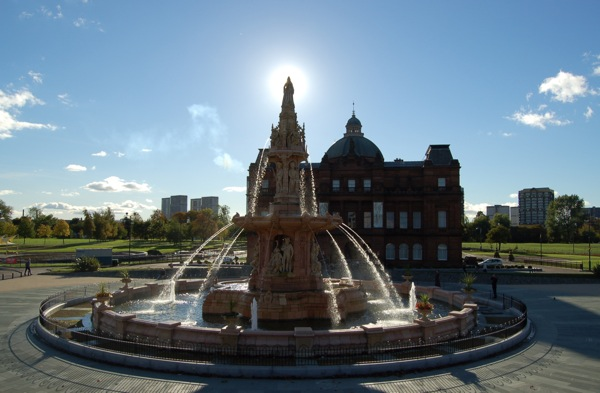
The Doulton Fountain on Glasgow Green (1888.) was originally made for the 1888 International Exhibition of Science, Art and Industry in Glasgow. The entire fountain is made of terra-cotta. The statue of Queen Victoria at the summit was destroyed by lightning and replaced by a copy.

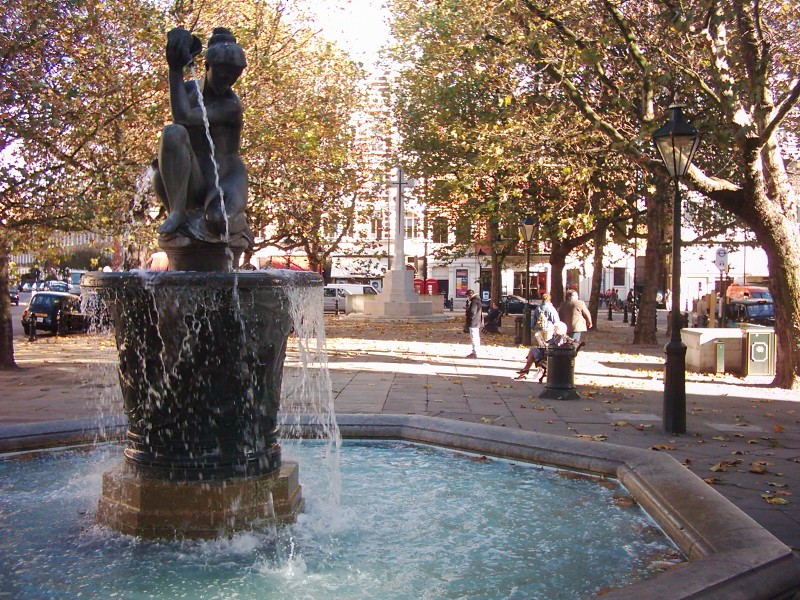
The Venus Fountain in Sloane Square, London (1953), depicts Venus, King Charles II and his mistress, Nell Gwynn, who lived nearby the square.

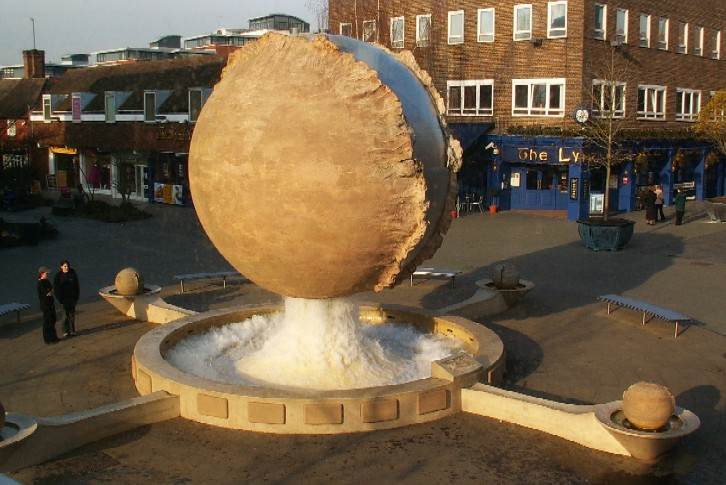
Rising Universe (1992), in Horsham, West Sussex, England. was built to commemorate the bicentenary of the birth of the poet Percy Bysshe Shelley, who was born near Horsham. The sphere fills gradually with water, sinks slowly, then suddenly releases 6.5 tons of water, and rises again.

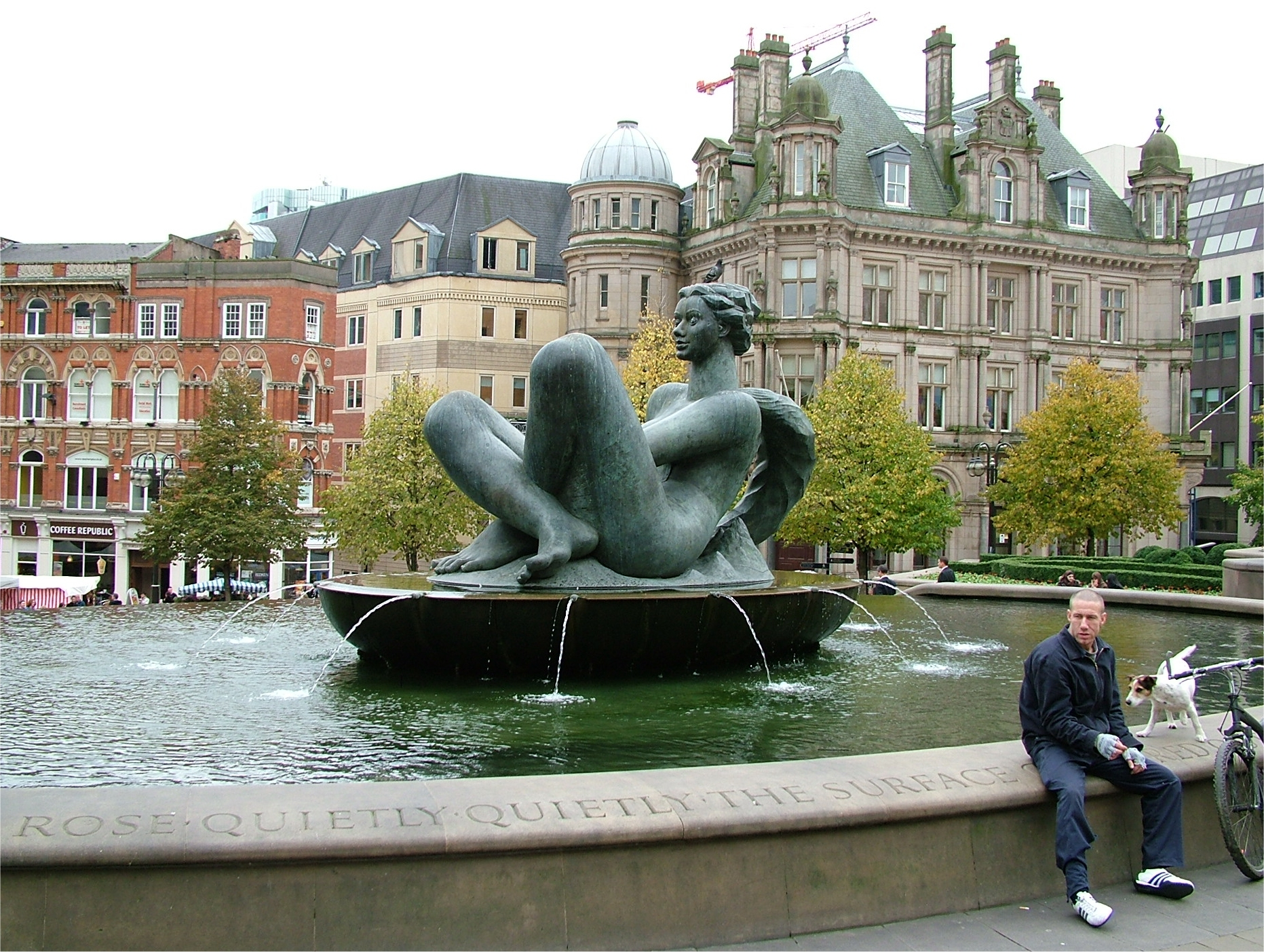
The River (1994), in Victoria Square, Birmingham was designed by Dhruva Mistry. It is known locally as "the Floozie in the Jacuzzi."

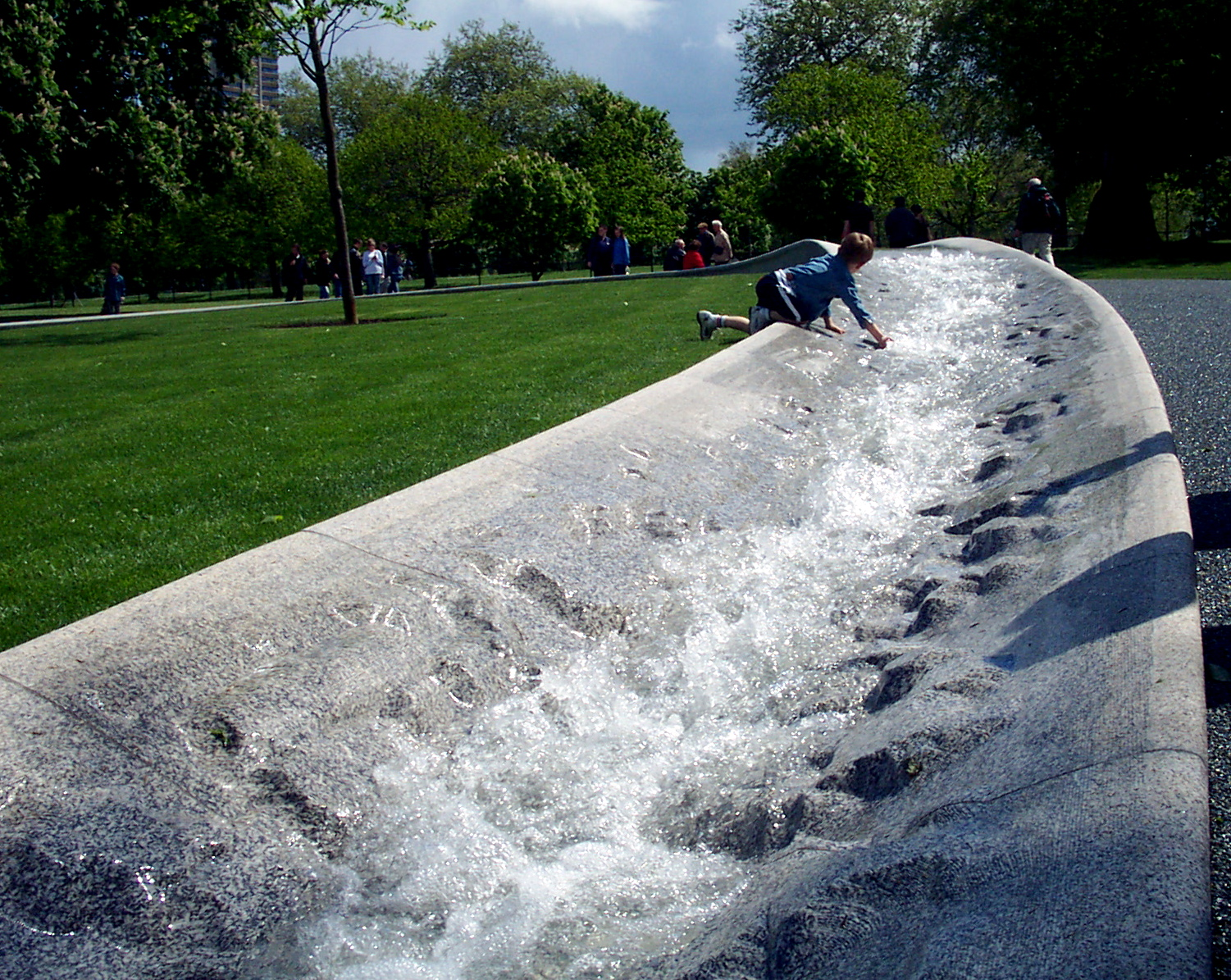
Diana, Princess of Wales Memorial Fountain in Hyde Park, London (2003)

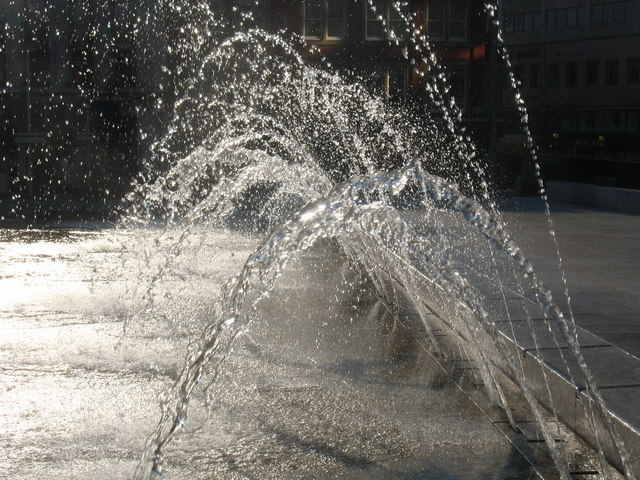
Old Market Square Nottingham by Kathryn Gustafson opened in 2007

== Bibliography ==
- Marilyn Symmes (editor), Fountains- Splash and Spectacle - Water and Design from the Renaissance to the Present. Thames and Hudson, in association with the Cooper-Hewillt National Design Museum of the Smithsonian Institution. (1988). (ISBN 0-500-23758-1).
