= Great Fountain, Enville =

Fountain in Enville, South Staffordshire, Staffordshire, England

Coordinates: 52°28′25″N 2°15′41″W

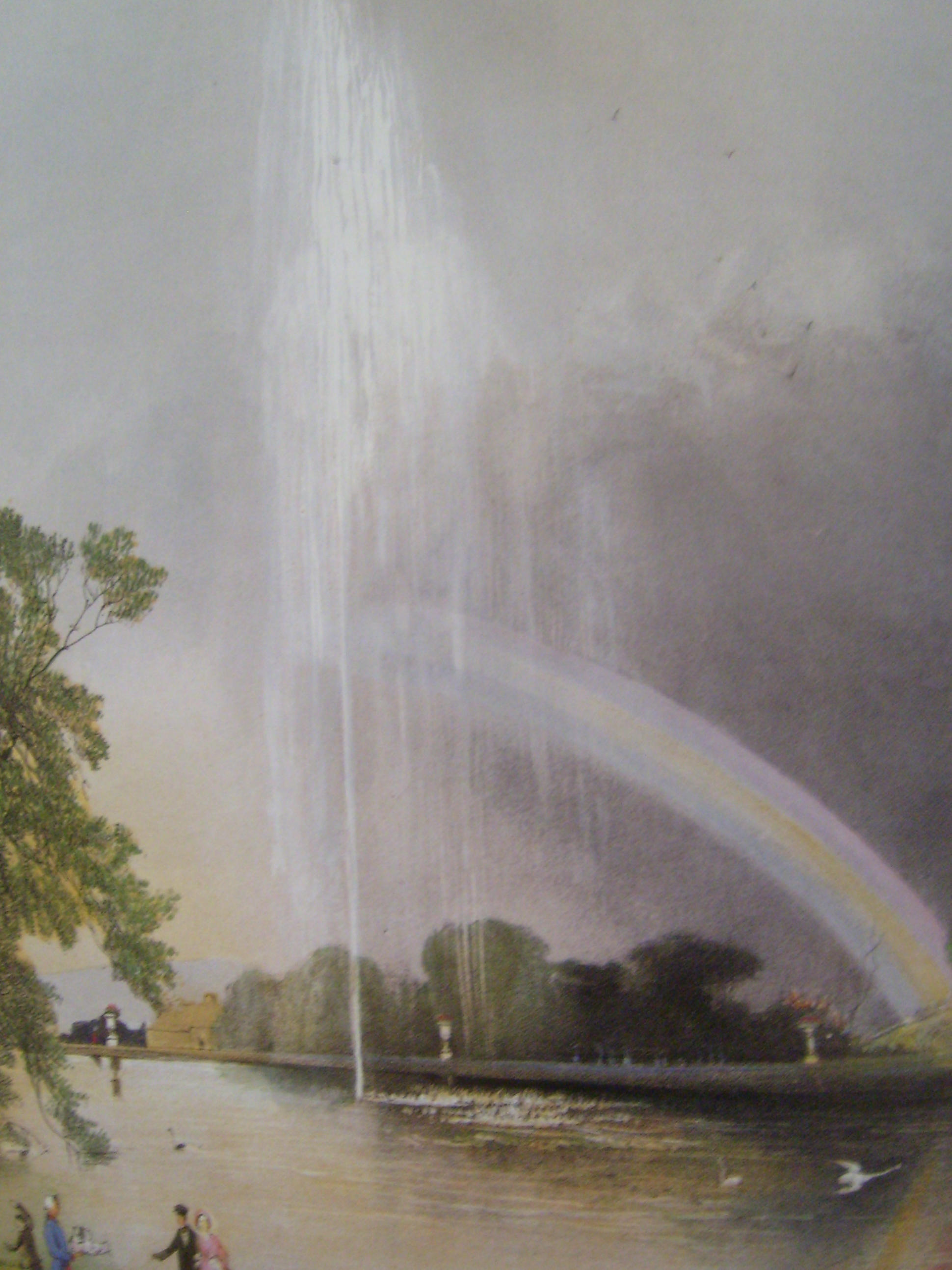
The Great Fountain, Enville, Staffordshire (1857)

The Great Fountain, Enville, was a fountain created in the mid-19th century by the Earl of Stamford in the middle of a lake on his Enville Hall estate, in Enville, Staffordshire, England.

The fountain was described by English artist, E. Adveno Brooke, who visited and made a chronolithograph of the fountain in 1857: "As we stood admiring the beauty and tranquility of the scene, a bubbling sound of water, at first gentle and gathering force by degrees, broke out and we beheld the commencement of one of the most beautiful aquatic displays it is possible to conceive. This, the large fountain, is on a level with the surface of the lake, and composed of five jets, the central one throwing a column of water 150 feet high; the supply being obtained from a large reservoir on the hill, to which it is first pumped by the united action of two engines, each of thirty horsepower." The water continued to jet for several minutes, until the water in the reservoir was exhausted.

The Great Fountain was the early ancestor of similar fountains located in lakes or bays, such as the Jet d'Eau in Geneva, Switzerland, which was first created in 1886, and more modern fountains, such as King Fahd's Fountain in Jeddah, Saudi Arabia, opened in 1985, which uses mechanical pumps to jet water upwards 312 metres (1,024 ft) above the surface of the Red Sea.

It is not known if the fountain still exists or operates today.

== Bibliography ==
- Marilyn Symmes (editor), Fountains- Splash and Spectacle - Water and Design from the Renaissance to the Present. Thames and Hudson, in association with the Cooper-Hewillt National Design Museum of the Smithsonian Institution. (1988). (ISBN 0-500-23758-1).
