= Astley Vicarage =

Listed building in Greater Manchester, England

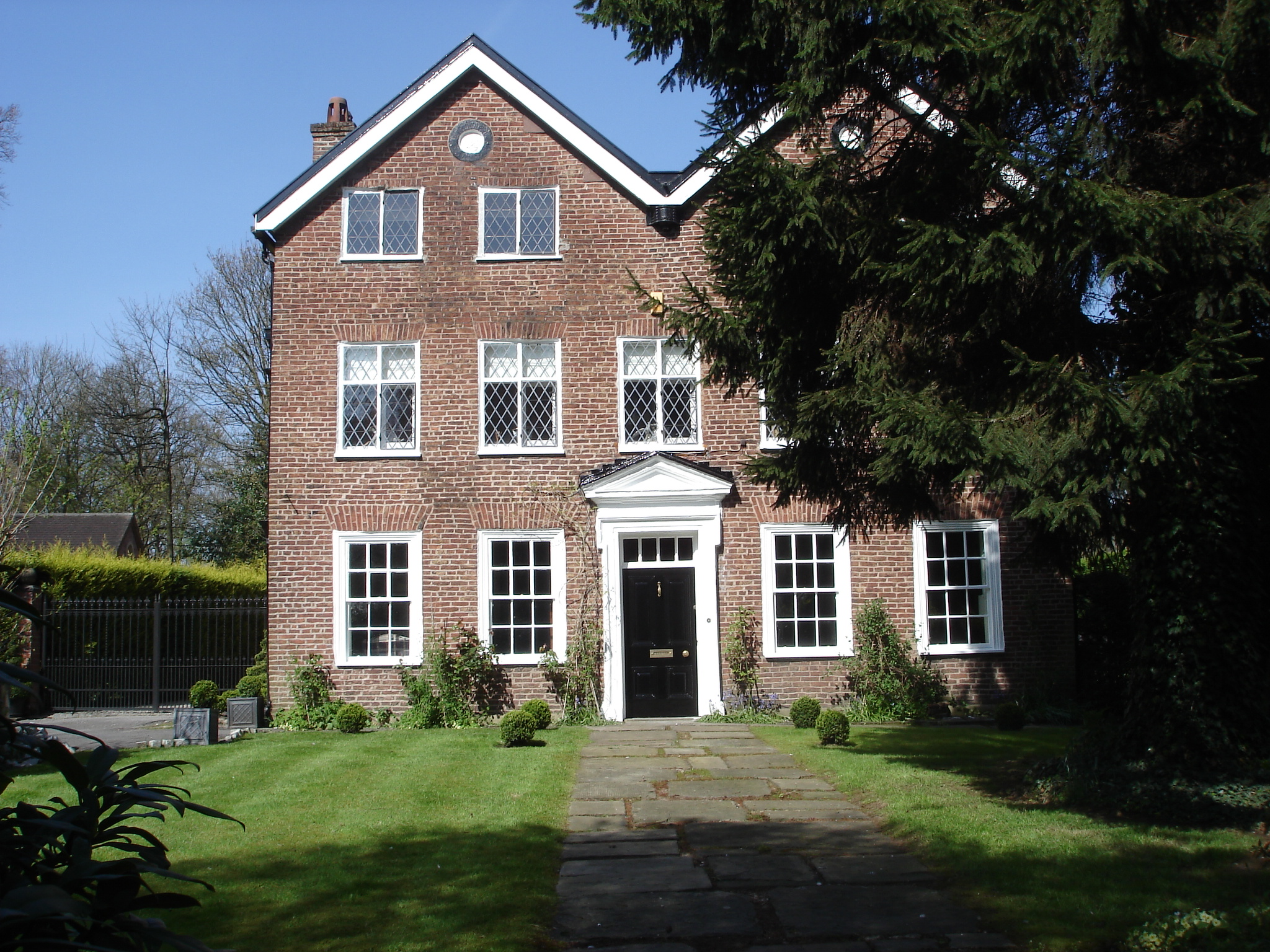
- Astley Vicarage in 2014

- Location within Greater Manchester
- Former names: The Parsonage; The Vicarage
- Alternative names: The Old Vicarage

General information
- Architectural style: Neoclassical
- Location: Church Road, Astley, Greater Manchester, England
- Coordinates: 53.5029°N 2.4540°W
- Year built: 1704; 322 years ago
- Renovated: 20th century (roof)

Listed Building – Grade II*
- Official name: Astley Vicarage
- Designated: 18 July 1966
- Reference no.: 1356223

Listed Building – Grade II
- Official name: Pair of gate piers at Astley Vicarage
- Designated: 18 July 1966
- Reference no.: 1068486

Astley Vicarage (also known as The Old Vicarage) is a Grade II* listed former parsonage on Church Road in Astley, a village within the Metropolitan Borough of Wigan, Greater Manchester, England. Historically in Lancashire, it is part of the Astley conservation area, and its listing highlights its early classical architectural style and historical associations with the local parish. The building was sold by the Church Commissioners in the 1990s and is now a private residence.

== History ==
The vicarage was constructed in 1704 as a parsonage for clergy serving the Astley area. Its origins are linked to Adam Mort, a Puritan philanthropist who endowed land for a church and parsonage in the early 17th century to improve religious provision in what was then a remote rural community. Initially referred to as "The Parsonage," the building became known as "The Vicarage" when Astley was established as a parish in 1867. For nearly three centuries, it served as the residence for successive vicars of St Stephen's Church.

On 18 July 1966, Astley Vicarage was designated a Grade II* listed building for its architectural and historic significance.

The building is part of the Astley village conservation area, which was designated in 1989 to protect the historic character of the settlement. In the 1990s, the Church Commissioners sold the property, and it has since been a private residence, often called "The Old Vicarage".

== Architecture ==
The building is an early example of domestic classicism in England. Constructed in English garden wall bond brick, the structure follows a double-depth central-staircase plan and rises three storeys in height across five bays. The symmetrical front elevation features twin gables and a central four-panel door framed by an eared and pedimented doorcase with an overlight. Windows on the ground floor include flush sashes, with cross casement windows on the first floor and two-pane casements on the second, all beneath flat brick arches. Decorative elements include round windows in the gables and an ornate rainwater head. The roof was replaced with 20th-century tiles.

The side elevations display similar gables, projecting chimney stacks with tall paired shafts, and mullioned windows, while the rear incorporates a two-storey lean-to extension. Internally, the building still has many of its original features, including ovolo-moulded floor beams, a dog-leg staircase with a handrail and decorative details, and original panelled and boarded doors throughout, contributing to its historic character.

=== Gate piers ===
The pair of gate piers at the vicarage are separately designated as a Grade II listed structure. Dating from the 18th century, they are constructed in stone and form part of the historic entrance to the vicarage grounds. The timber gate is a replacement.

== See also ==
- Grade II* listed buildings in Greater Manchester
- Listed buildings in Astley, Greater Manchester
