= Rudesind Barlow =

English Benedictine monk, academic, and Rector

Rudesind Barlow (1585–1656) was an English Benedictine monk, a recusant academic, and Rector of the English College in Douai.

== Life ==
He was born William Barlow in 1585, the third son of Sir Alexander Barlow of Barlow Hall, Chorlton-cum-Hardy, near Manchester and his wife, Mary Brereton. As an adult, Barlow went to France to be educated with his younger brother Edward at the English College in Douai. (His brother became Ambrose Barlow and is venerated as one of the Forty Martyrs of England and Wales.)

Wishing to become a Benedictine, Barlow joined the Spanish congregation in 1604 at which time he was given the religious name by which he is now known, being professed at Cella Nueva in Galicia in 1605. Ordained a Catholic priest in 1608, he graduated with the degree of Doctor of Divinity at Salamanca. In 1611 he transferred to join the community of English monks at the Priory of St Gregory the Great in Douai (now Downside Abbey in England), where he was made its prior in 1614. Two years later he was also appointed a professor of theology at St. Vaast College of the University of Douai, a house of studies for the monks of the Abbey of St. Vaast, motherhouse of Douai Priory. He held this office for forty years.

From 1621 to 1629 Barlow served as the President General of the English Benedictine Congregation. In 1633 he became titular Cathedral-Prior of Canterbury. Beyond a circular letter to the English Benedictines about their relations with the Vicar Apostolic of England, none of his writings survive. According to Ralph Weldon, Barlow was looked on as a leading theologian and canonist; and effectively opposed Richard Smith, who claimed leadership of the English Roman Catholics, in becoming Bishop of Chalcedon. On the death of William Bishop, the first Vicar Apostolic of England, Barlow was consulted by the pope as to the best successor, and recommended Smith; but later he differed on the question of the extent of the vicar's jurisdiction.

Ralph Weldon said: "He formed almost all the bishops, abbots, and professors that flourished in those parts for some time after. He was esteemed the first or chief of the scholastic divines or casuists of his time, and in knowledge of the canon law inferior to no one of his time or the age before." The circle of his friends included Robert Bellarmine and other contemporary scholars. He often worked behind the scenes with one description of his being "A mandarin operating at the still centre of power".

He more than once refused the dignity of abbot and bishop, "and it was thought he would have refused that of cardinal, which was said to have been preparing for him." From 1621 to 1629 he was President-General of the English Congregation. In 1633 he became titular Cathedral-Prior of Canterbury. Beyond a circular letter to the English Benedictines about their relations to the vicar Apostolic, none of his writings are left, although Gee, writing in 1624, attributes to him a book called "The Enemies of God". Weldon added that after his death a bishop offered the Benedictines of Douai an establishment if they would give him Rudesind's writings, "but in vain they were sought for, for they were destroyed by an enemy".
