= Elizabeth Evelinge =

17th-century English Catholic abbess and translator

Sister Catharine Magdalen O.S.C.
- Abbess of Saint-Augustin-de-Clarques

Personal details
- Born: Elizabeth Evelinge; 1596/1597 England
- Died: 1668 Aire-sur-la-Lys, France
- Denomination: Catholic Church
- Occupation: nun, abbess, translator

Sister Catharine Magdalen O.S.C., born Elizabeth Evelinge, (1596/1597 – 1668) was a Catholic abbess and English translator whose work has been confused with that of Catherine Bentley.

== Life ==
Evelinge was born in 1596 or 1597 and she is thought to have had two sisters, Rose and Mary Evelinge. She and Rose were already at the Convent of Poor Clares, Gravelines where Elizabeth Tyldesley was the abbess in 1620. They took vows on 22 July 1620 and Mary Evelinge joined them in 1621. The convent thrived and it created three new dependant communities including one in 1629 in Aire-sur-la-Lys.

Evelinge moved to Aire-sur-la-Lys and after serving as Portress and Mistress of Novices. In about 1633 she became the abbess there. She was abbess for 25 years and she died there in 1668. After she died her obituary noted that she had translated "The History of the Angelicall Virgin Glorious St. Clare" by Luke Wadding which was published in 1635 in Dobai. Wadding was an influential Irish historian and theologian. However the book in question states that it was translated by another nun Catharine Bentley aka Sister Magdalen Augustine. Catherine Bentley had become a nun in 1611 and she died in 1659 as the abbess of the convent in Aire.

They may have both worked on it or the historical records disagree.
