= Battle of Burton Bridge =

There have been two Battles of Burton Bridge, both fought over the medieval bridge at Burton upon Trent:

- Battle of Burton Bridge (1322) - a victory for King Edward II over the rebellious Earl of Lancaster
- Battle of Burton Bridge (1643) - a victory for the Royalists in the First English Civil War
