= Listed buildings in Astley, Greater Manchester =

Astley is a settlement in the Metropolitan Borough of Wigan in Greater Manchester, England. Originally a village, it now forms a continuous urban area with Tyldesley to the north. It lies on flat land north of Chat Moss and is crossed by the Bridgewater Canal and the A580 "East Lancashire Road". Astley contains 10 listed buildings designated by English Heritage and included in the National Heritage List for England. Of these, three are listed at Grade II*, the middle of the three grades, and the others are at Grade II, the lowest grade.

Astley's listed buildings reflect its history and include farmhouses and ancient halls, two with moated sites. Damhouse or Astley Hall, which for centuries was the manor house for the township, is included in this list although it is just across the boundary in Tyldesley. Astley's second chapel was destroyed in an arson attack in 1961 but the vicarage stands and is listed. Industry in the 20th century is represented by the former engine house and headgear at Astley Green Colliery Museum.

== Key ==
Grade	Criteria
II*	Particularly important buildings of more than special interest
II	Buildings of national importance and special interest

== Buildings and structures ==
Name and location	Photograph	Date	Notes	Grade
Morleys Hall; 53.4892°N 2.4693°W		16th century	Morleys Hall, now a private residence, is a moated hall converted to two houses on the edge of Astley Moss. The hall which was largely rebuilt in the 19th century on the site of a medieval timber-framed house, incorporates elements from the 16th and 17th centuries. The moat a scheduled monument.	II*
Peel Hall; 53.4934°N 2.4559°W	—	16th century	Peel Hall was built in the 16th century, but rebuilt in the 18th and early 19th centuries. It is built on a moated site of English garden wall bond brick with slate roof on a projecting stone plinth from an earlier building on the site once owned by Cockersand Abbey.	II
Damhouse; 53.503°N 2.456°W		1650	Damhouse or Astley Hall was the manor house for Astley though it is inside the Tyldesley boundary. It was used as the administration block for Astley Hospital. Since 1991 Morts Astley Heritage Trust has renovated it for office use and tea room. The house is built of rendered brick with stone details and a slate roof. The three-storey frontage has five unequal bays with stone mullioned windows and crosswing gables. The central three-storey porch bay has a studded oak door with Doric columns, pediment and a fanlight. The frontage is largely as built but the plaque over the door is a replacement. The east wing dating from the early 19th century is of rendered brick and has a chapel on the first floor. Restoration in 1999–2000 discovered the attic contained a "short" long gallery that had subsequently been subdivided.	II*
Sales House; 53.4836°N 2.4656°W	—	17th century	Sales House is a mid-to-late 17th-century farmhouse built in English garden wall bond brick with a stone slate and slate roof. The two-storey house has a T-shaped plan and four bays one of which is a gabled crosswing. It has its original boarded door with strap hinges.	II
Astley Vicarage; 53.5029°N 2.4540°W		1704	Astley Vicarage is built in English garden wall bond brick. It has three storeys and its twin-gabled front has five bays and a central door. The house has had few alterations since it was built and is a combination of early Classical and vernacular architecture. Pevsner considers it a "very attractive and interesting house" possibly dating to 1704.	II*
Manor House Farmhouse; 53.4986°N 2.4477°W	—	1730	Manor House Farmhouse is a three-storey house built in brick with slate roof. Originally built with three bays a fourth was added later. The doorway has Ionic half-columns and plain entablature. The house has sash windows to the front and casement windows to the rear.	II
Gate piers at Astley Vicarage; 53.5029°N 2.4540°W	—	18th century	The 18th-century square stone gate piers at Astley Vicarage have moulded bases and caps. The timber gate is a replacement.	II
Morleys Hall Barn; 53.4892°N 2.4693°W	—	Early 19th century	Morleys Hall Barn comprises an early 19th-century threshing barn, byre and overloft and a lower range to south. It is built in red brick in English garden wall bond and has a slated roof. It has a recessed entry bay above which are stacked decorative ventilation panels. The moat a scheduled monument.	II
Astley Green Mining Museum winding house 53.4956°N 2.4467°W		1912	The former engine house housing Astley Green Colliery's twin tandem compound steam engine is now part of Astley Green Colliery Museum. It is built in brick, seven bays long and three bays wide under a slate roof. The bays have round-arched windows with iron glazing bars. The site is protected as a Scheduled Monument.	II
Astley Green Museum winding tower 53.4952°N 2.4467°W		1912	Astley Green Colliery Museum has the only surviving headgear on the Lancashire Coalfield. It is made from wrought iron lattice girders with rivetted plates at the joints. It has two large and one small wheels mounted at the top. It is nearly 30 metres (98 ft) tall and was built by Head Wrightson of Stockton-on-Tees in 1912 for Astley Green Colliery. The site is protected as a Scheduled Monument.	II
