= Elizabeth Tyldesley =

Elizabeth Tyldesley (or Clare Mary Ann, OSC) (1585–1654) was a 17th-century abbess at the Poor Clare Convent at Gravelines.

== Life ==
Elizabeth Tyldesley born in 1585, was the daughter of Thomas Tyldesley of Morleys Hall, Astley and Myerscough Hall and Elizabeth Anderton of Lostock, in Lancashire (now Greater Manchester). Her family were recusants and her mother arranged a pension for the Roman Catholic priest, Ambrose Barlow, so that he could secretly carry out priestly duties, offering Mass in the homes of Roman Catholics in the Leigh parish. Her grandfather, Edward Tyldesley, had left her a dowry of £500, but she never married.

Instead Elizabeth joined the English community of nuns of the Order of St. Clare, then called "Claresses", at Gravelines, at that time part of the Spanish Netherlands. The Poor Clare Convent at Gravelines was a religious community founded in 1607 by Mary Ward for English Roman Catholic women who wished to live the contemplative life of a nun, which was impossible after the Reformation and its consequence, the Dissolution of the Monasteries.

Elizabeth was one of seven candidates who received their religious habits on 5 February 1609. She assumed the name of Sister Clare Mary Ann when she received the habit. She completed her novitiate year and professed her first vows 3 November 1610. The way of life of the Poor Clares was austere: the nuns slept on straw sacks, ate meat only at Christmas and spent much of their day in silent prayer or contemplation, speaking only when necessary and with permission.

Five years later, she was elected abbess of the community. Previous incumbents of that office had struggled with financial difficulties, but under Mother Clare Mary Ann the establishment flourished. In 1626 a Franciscan deposed her from her role as abbess and she was replaced with Margaret Radcliffe. This was a very unpopular move and a fire broke out at the convent which was supposed by some to be divine intervention. Tyldesley was restored to her former position in 1627.

Tyldesley became Superior of four communities of Poor Clares, both Irish and English, and received more than a hundred women into religious life. Elizabeth died on 17 February 1654 after 44 years in the monastery, of which she had served as abbess for 39.

Tyldesley's nephew, the Cavalier and Catholic Sir Thomas Tyldesley, considered to be "one of the wealthiest gentlemen in Lancashire", must have been proud of his aunt's achievements, according to historian Gordon Blackwood.
