= Chorlton-cum-Hardy Golf Club =

UK golf club

Coordinates: 53°25′38″N 2°16′44″W

Chorlton-cum-Hardy Golf Club is a golf club in Chorlton-cum-Hardy in the southern suburbs of Manchester, England. It is separated from Sale Golf Club to the south only by the River Mersey. The clubhouse of the golf club is located at Barlow Hall, originally built in the 13th century, but rebuilt by Alexander Barlow in 1584. Edward Barlow was born at Barlow Hall in 1585 and was hanged for adhering to the Catholic faith at Lancaster Gaol in 1641. He was later canonized as Saint Ambrose Barlow in 1970 and his ghost reportedly haunts the upper floors of the hall. Although a golf course had existed here for centuries the modern formal club was established in 1903. In September 2011 it hosted the Mersey Championship.
