= Ralph Weldon =

Ralph Weldon may refer to:

- Ralph Weldon (Benedictine) (1674–1713), English Benedictine monk and chronicler
- Ralph Weldon (politician) (1606–1676), English politician
