= Astley Green Colliery Museum =

Museum in Greater Manchester, England

Lancashire Mining Museum
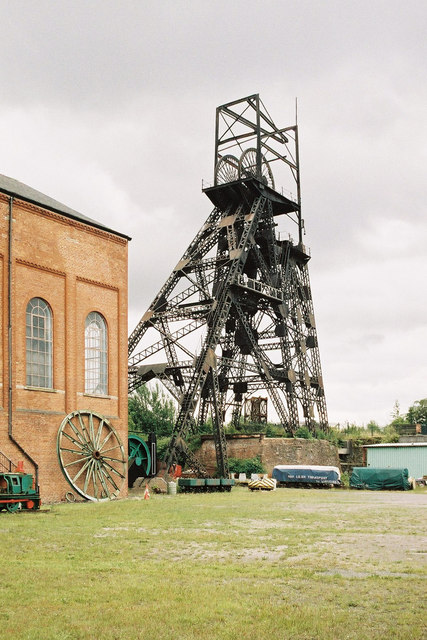
- Astley Green Colliery Museum
- Location: Astley in Greater Manchester, England
- Coordinates: 53.4953°N 2.4473°W (grid reference SJ70509996)
- Type: Heritage centre
- Website: Lancashire Mining Museum

The Astley Green Colliery Museum is a heritage museum in Astley near Tyldesley in Greater Manchester, England, operated by the Red Rose Steam Society. The site was originally a working colliery that produced coal from 1912 until its closure in 1970 and is now protected as a Scheduled Monument. The museum occupies a 15-acre (6 ha) site beside the Bridgewater Canal and contains the only surviving pit headgear and engine house on the Lancashire Coalfield.

== History ==
Astley Green Colliery was established to extract deep coal seams of the Manchester Coalfield beneath the peat bog known as Chat Moss, motivated by high coal demand in the late 19th and early 20th centuries and the depletion of accessible coal reserves in the Irwell Valley. Shaft sinking began in 1908 by the Pilkington Colliery Company, a subsidiary of the Clifton and Kersley Coal Company, and the pit began production in 1912. In 1928 the colliery was amalgamated with other local collieries to form Manchester Collieries. The mine was modernised when the coal industry was nationalised in 1947. Astley Green Colliery was closed in 1970 and was subsequently opened to the public as a museum.

== Museum ==
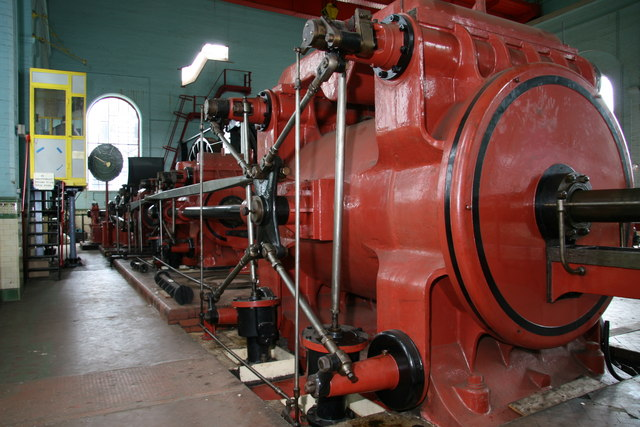
Astley Green Colliery's winding engine

The colliery’s headgear, constructed of wrought iron lattice girders with riveted joints and three wheel mounts, rises to nearly 30 metres (98 ft). Built by Head Wrightson of Stockton-on-Tees and completed in 1912, it is the only surviving pit headgear on the Lancashire coalfield. It has two large and one small wheel mounted at the top. In the winding house there is a twin tandem compound steam engine made by Yates and Thom of Blackburn who supplied 16 Lancashire boilers. Its engine house has the largest steam winding engine used on the coalfield. The 3,300 horse power twin tandem compound engine was built by Yates & Thom in Blackburn.

The museum’s collection includes 28 colliery locomotives, which has been described by sources as the largest assembly of its kind in the United Kingdom.

== Railway ==
Volunteers have restored a section of approximately 200 m of track, and one locomotive was operational as of 2019, with another undergoing essential maintenance pending the start of passenger services on the railway.

== See also ==
- List of Collieries in Astley and Tyldesley
- Scheduled Monuments in Greater Manchester
- Listed buildings in Astley, Greater Manchester
