= St Ambrose Barlow Catholic High School =

Secondary school in Merseyside, England

St Ambrose Barlow Catholic High School was a mixed secondary school located in Netherton in the English county of Merseyside. The school was closed in Summer 2016.

It was a voluntary aided school administered by Sefton Metropolitan Borough Council and the Roman Catholic Archdiocese of Liverpool. The school was named after Saint Ambrose Barlow, one of the Forty Martyrs of England and Wales.

St Ambrose Barlow Catholic High School offered GCSEs, BTECs and OCR Nationals as programmes of study for pupils. Graduating pupils wishing to enter sixth form usually went on to attend South Sefton College which is located nearby.

In July 2015 the Archdiocese of Liverpool announced that it had written to Sefton Metropolitan Borough Council to request legal proceedings to formally close St Ambrose Barlow Catholic High School. Reasons for the closure included a decrease in pupil numbers at the school. This led to a local petition to save the school from closure; however, this failed, meaning the school could not be saved from closure. In January 2016 Sefton Metropolitan Borough Council approved the closure for the end of the summer term in 2016. In July 2016, the school closed. The school has now been demolished and there are plans replace it with housing to boost popularity throughout Sefton.
