= Margaret Radcliffe =

English nun and abbess

Margaret Radcliffe/Radclyffe
- Born: 1582; England
- Died: 1654 (aged 71–72); Aire
- Other name: Abbess
- Occupation: nun

Margaret Radcliffe, also known as Margaret Paul (1582–1654), was an English nun who briefly served as abbess of the English Convent of Poor Clares, Gravelines, and was the founding superior of English convents in Brussels and Aire.

== Early life ==
Radcliffe was born in the 1580s. Her parents were Isabel (née Grey) and Sir Francis Radcliffe (1563–1622) of Dilston near Corbridge in Northumberland, and Derwentwater in Cumberland. She was their second daughter, but the first of four to commit to religious life. Her father was a noted recusant who was taken for questioning after the Gunpowder Plot in 1605. Building at the family seat including a chapel was said to have been funded by money left over after the plot failed.

== Religious career ==
The Radcliffes were Catholics, which was illegal in England at the time. This caused Margaret to go to the Spanish Netherlands. At Gravelines, she was clothed in the habit of the Poor Clares on 2 July 1611, and took her vows on 3 July 1612, at age 27. Mary Ward had founded the community in 1607 but subsequently left. Elizabeth Tyldesley, Mother Clare Mary Ann, was elected as abbess in 1615.

In 1617, Radcliffe's sister Elizabeth joined her and two years later their other two of sisters, Dorothy and Ann, had entered the convent. She and Elizabeth, were sent to Brussels in 1622 to found a new Franciscan convent. She was abbess and her sister was to be her assistant. They lived there for four years. Radcliffe created a regime for the nuns although she later feared that it was too tough as it was based on her own training as a Poor Clare. However it went well and in time they could leave with a new abbess appointed.

In September 1626, a Franciscan commissary deposed Tyldesley as abbess at Gravelines and appointed Radcliffe to replace her. This was unpopular and a fire broke out at the convent, allegedly divine retribution. Tyldesley was restored to her former position in 1627 after Radcliffe, and ten others, were moved to the Poor Clare convent in Dunkirk.

In 1629, a new convent was established at Aire in Artois with Radcliffe as abbess. The 24 founding members included those who had followed her to Dunkirk two years before. Radcliffe died at Aire in 1654.
