= Damhouse =

Listed building in Greater Manchester, England

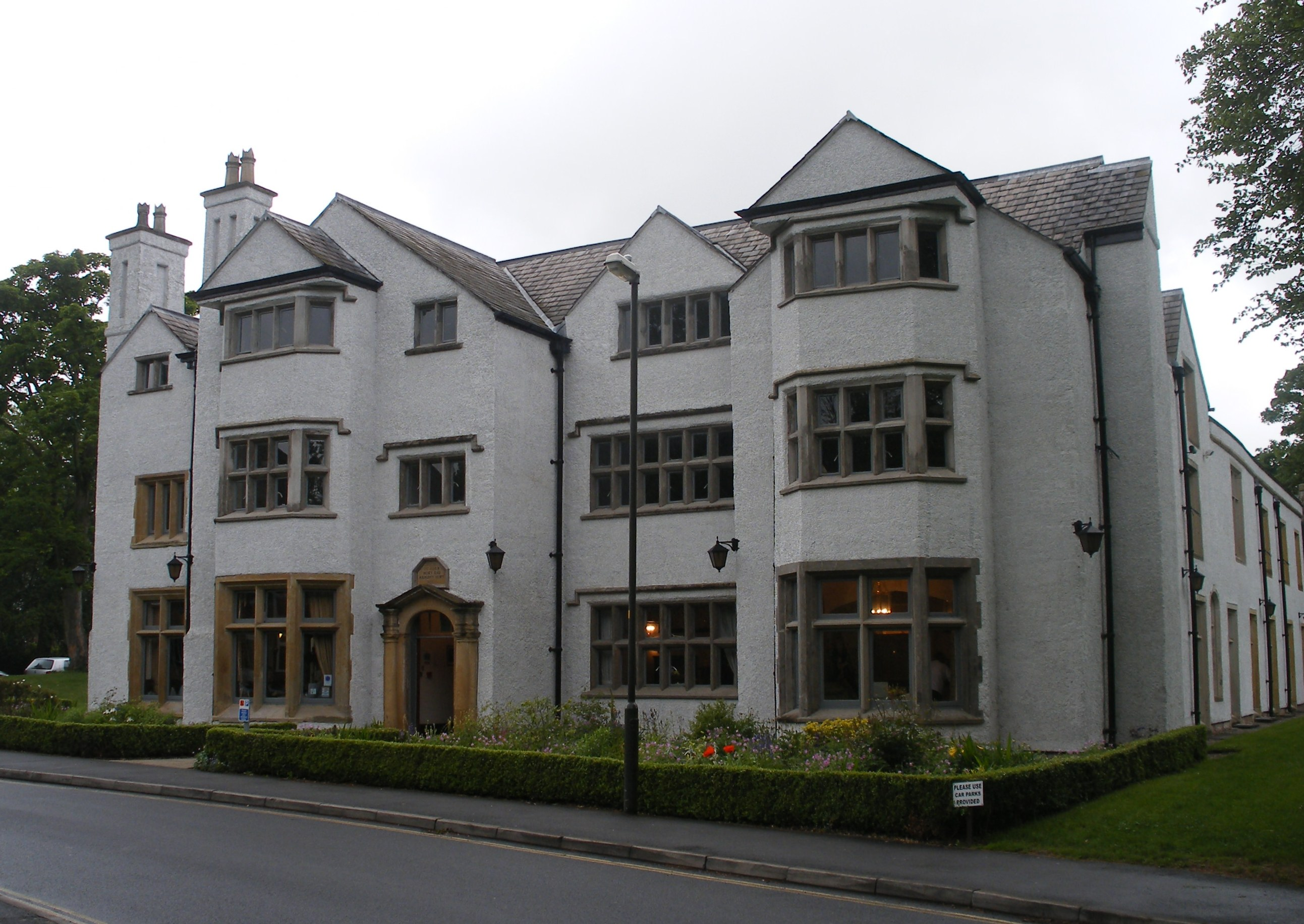
- Damhouse in 2011

- Location within Greater Manchester
- Alternative names: Astley Hall

General information
- Type: Manor house
- Location: Church Road, Astley, Greater Manchester, England
- Coordinates: 53.503°N 2.456°W
- Year built: 17th century
- Renovated: Early and late 19th century (added)
- Owner: Morts Astley Heritage Group

Design and construction
- Designations

Listed Building – Grade II*
- Official name: Administration block at Astley Hospital
- Designated: 18 July 1966
- Reference no.: 1163258

Website
- www.damhouse.net

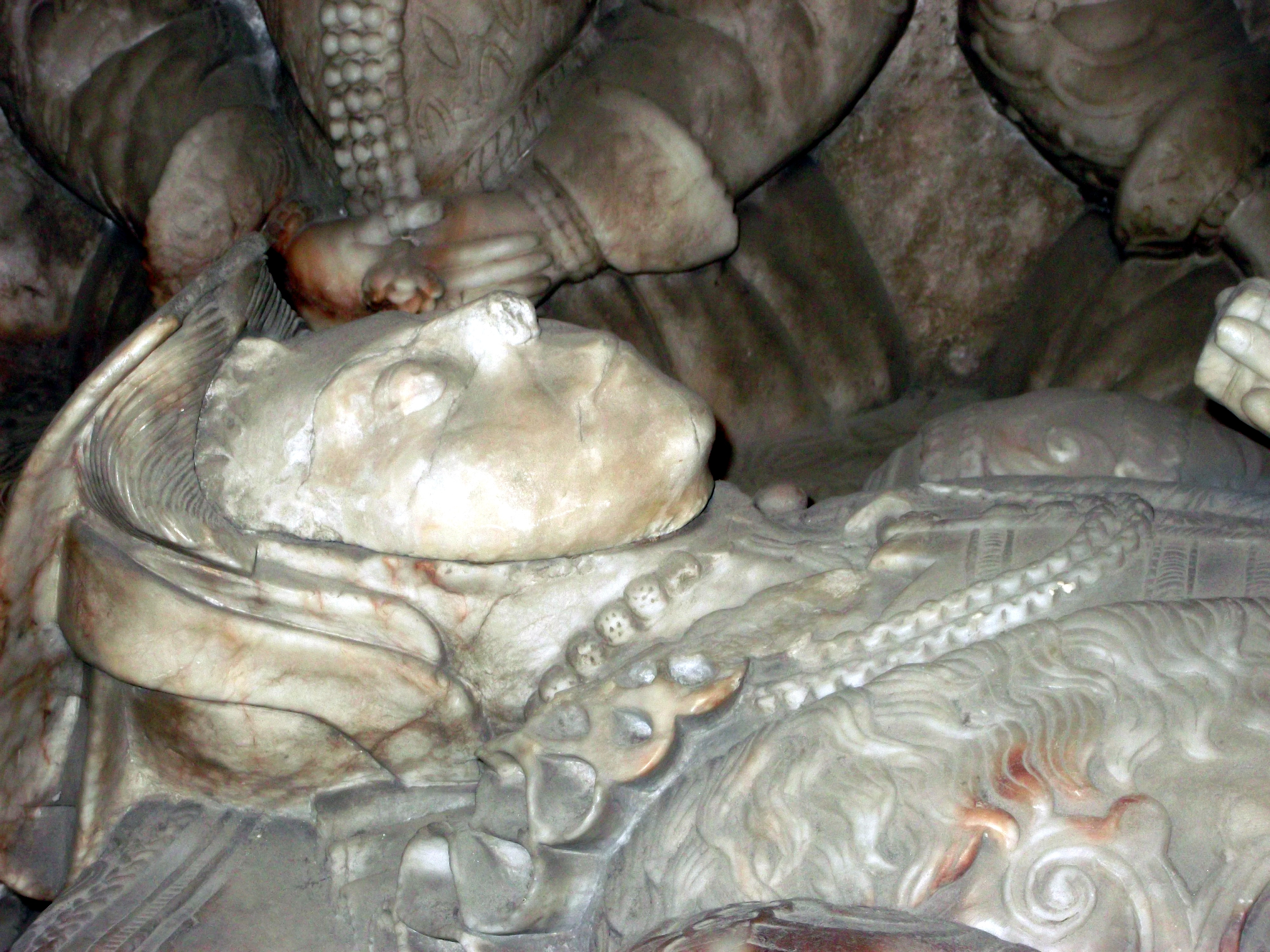
Ann Radcliff of Winmarleigh, last of the Radcliff heirs to Damhouse. Effigy in the Gerard Chapel, Church of St John the Baptist, Ashley, Staffordshire.

Damhouse or Astley Hall is a Grade II* listed building on Church Road in Astley, a village in the Metropolitan Borough of Wigan, Greater Manchester, England. It has served as a manor house, sanatorium, and since restoration in 2000, houses offices, a clinic, nursery and tearooms. The site was the manor house for the lords of the manors of Astley and Tyldesley from medieval times. The inscription over the lintel reads, "Erected by Adam Mort and Margret Mort 1650".

== History ==
From medieval times, Damhouse was the site of the manor house for the lords of the manors of Astley and Tyldesley. Hugh Tyldesley was the first recorded occupant of the Damhouse in 1212. He was succeeded by his son Henry. The manors were separated after the death of Hugh's grandson, Henry, in 1301 and Damhouse became the manor house for Astley. In 1345 Richard Radcliff took possession of the hall and became lord of the manor in 1353. The Radcliffs remained in possession until the failure of the male line with William Radcliff's death in 1561 and his half sister Ann Radcliff inherited. Ann's husband, Gilbert Gerard, became lord of the manor. He was attorney general to Queen Elizabeth I and was knighted in 1579. His son, Thomas Gerard, inherited the house and mortgaged it to James Anderton of Lostock.

Adam Mort bought the hall and 60-acre estate in 1595 and bought the manorial rights in 1606. Mort was a wealthy man and built a new house. He built Astley Chapel, the first chapel of ease to Leigh Parish Church and Morts Grammar School, Astley's first school. Adam Mort died in 1631 and was succeeded by his son Thomas who lived at Peel Hall, Little Hulton. Thomas's son, Adam, inherited Damhouse whilst a minor in 1638. The inscription over the lintel reads, "Erected by Adam Mort and Margret Mort 1650". Adam died in 1658 leaving the property to his son Thomas who was four years old. Thomas died unmarried in 1733. The property was bought by Thomas Sutton, a distant cousin in 1734. After Sutton's death in 1752 his cousin, Thomas Froggatt, inherited the estate which was in turn left to his son, Thomas. After 1799 the house was occupied by tenants including George Ormerod, who had inherited the Banks Estate of his uncle Thomas Johnson in Tyldesley.

Thomas Froggat's granddaughter Sarah, married twice. By her first husband John Adam Durie, she had a daughter Katherine. She married Malcolm Nugent Ross in 1844 and he leased the coal rights under the estate to Astley and Tyldesley Collieries in 1857. Katherine Durie became lady of the manor on the death of her mother in 1860. By now the estate was in decline. Katherine married Henry Davenport who died in 1845, and secondly Sir Edward Wetherall. In 1856 he was living at Damhouse. Upon his death in 1869 he was succeeded by George Nugent Ross Wetherall and then by his brother Henry Augustus Wetherall who was in financial difficulty.

Damhouse was sold in November 1889 and remained empty until 1893 when it was sold to the Leigh Council for use as a sanatorium for treating infectious diseases. Four isolation wards were built to house patients with scarlet and typhoid fevers and the house was used as offices and a nurses' home.

== House ==
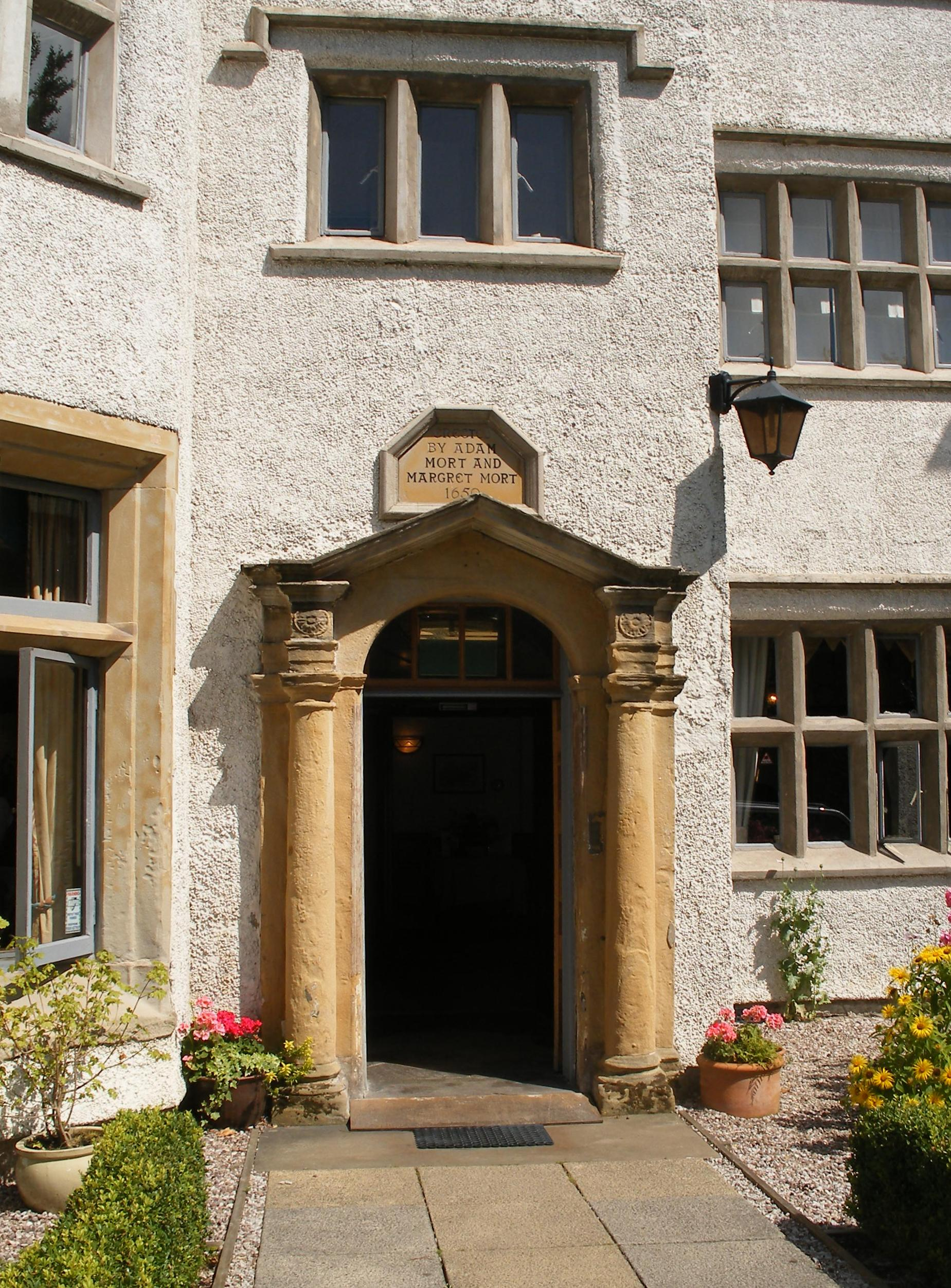
Doorway with Ionic columns, pediment and fanlight

An earlier building on the site was a stone and timber hall close to a large barn and cornmill powered by a water wheel. The house gets its name from the dam on the brook that was built to power the wheel.

The manor house Adam Mort built, dating from around 1600, is described in his will; he died in 1631. The house had a kitchen, parlour with a parlour chamber over it, bed chamber, little chamber, buttery, dairy, loft and clock loft with a bell. The house may have had a chapel. Outside there were stables, pig sties and a ruined stone and timber barn. The three-storey building was built of handmade bricks with a timber frame. A timber lintel over an inglenook fireplace has been dated to before 1600.

Much of this building survives, though Mort's grandson altered the front of the building in 1650 as evidenced by a plaque over the door. Considerable additions were made in the 18th and 19th centuries when the two-storey east wing was built for the Froggatts. It contains a large first-floor billiard room with four decorative gothic roof trusses. A single-storey north wing with a two-storey coach house was added before 1845 and a single storey west wing added sometime after 1845 when the house was restored by Sarah and Malcolm Ross.

The house, built around a quadrangle, open at the south west corner is built of rendered brick with stone details and a slate roof. The three-storey frontage has five unequal bays with stone mullioned windows and crosswing gables. There are canted three-storey bay windows in two of the crosswings. The central three-storey porch bay has a studded oak door with Doric columns, pediment and a fanlight. The frontage is largely as built but the plaque over the door is a 20th-century replacement. The east wing dating from the early 19th century is of rendered brick and has four-bays which included a chapel on the first floor. The north and west extensions are built of brick.

Restoration in 1999–2000 uncovered a "short" long gallery in the attic, 64 feet (20 m) in length. It had been sub-divided and is the only known example in North West England.

== Present day ==
Astley Hospital closed in 1994 and Morts Astley Heritage Group was founded with the aim of saving the listed building. After fundraising and acquiring grants from the Heritage Lottery Fund, the group bought the house and surrounding woodland in order to preserve it. Damhouse was renovated by 2000 and space within the property rented to the local clinic, a private nursery, and various businesses. On site is a tea room and a conference room and community rooms are available to hire.

The house is set in an area of woodland and there is a pond with an accessible footpath.

== See also ==
- Grade II* listed buildings in Greater Manchester
- Listed buildings in Astley, Greater Manchester
