= Thomas Tyldesley =

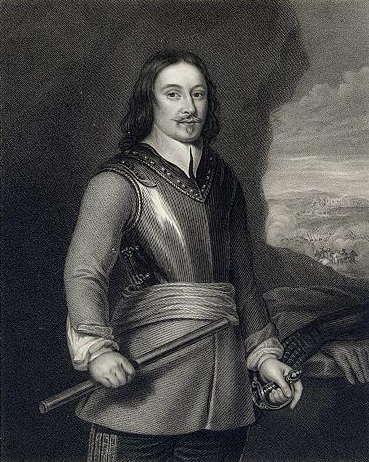
An 1831 engraving of Sir Thomas Tyldesley by John Cochran, after an earlier painting

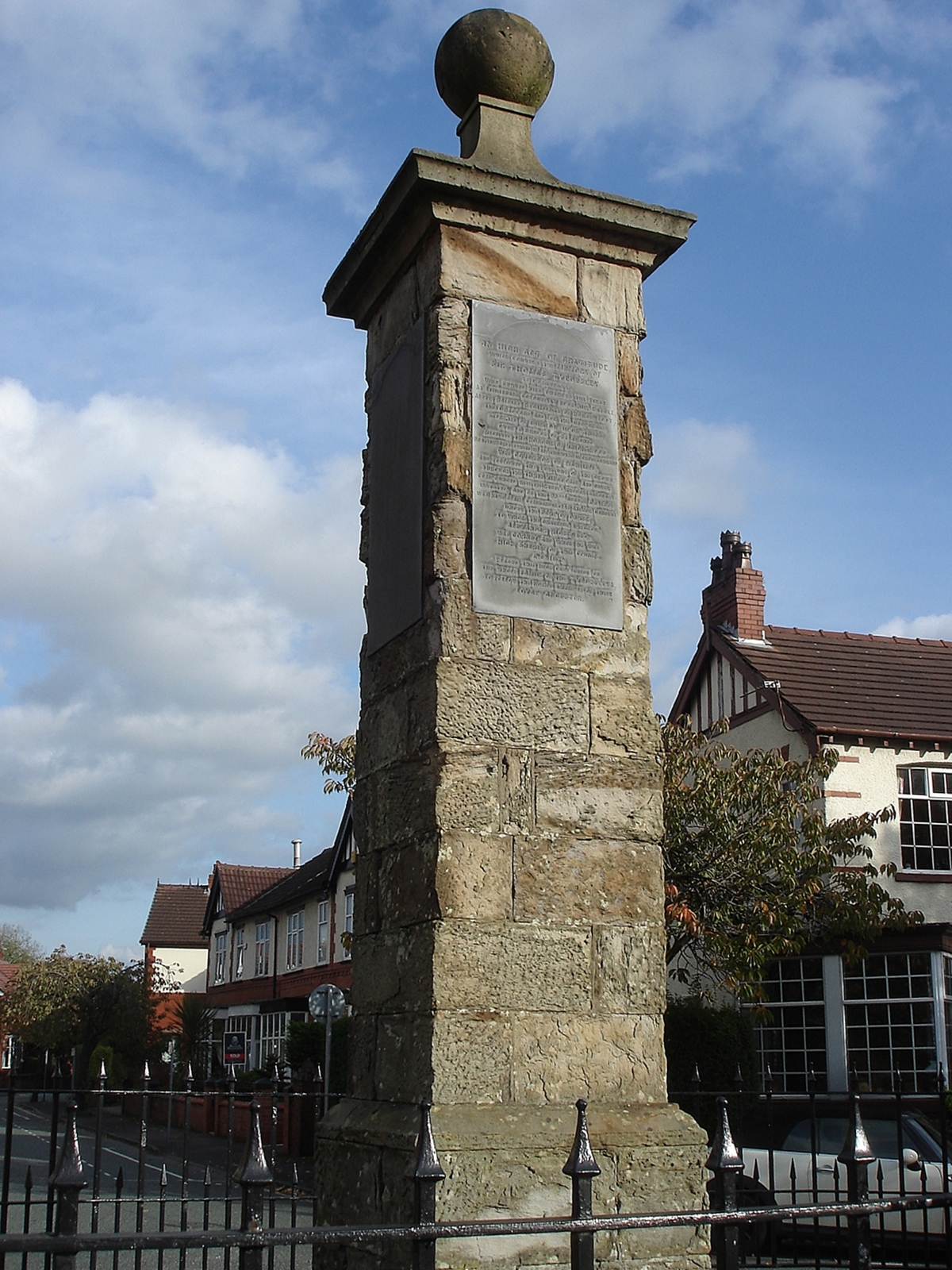
Monument to Sir Thomas Tyldesley, Wigan at the site of his death

Sir Thomas Tyldesley (1612 – 25 August 1651) was a supporter of Charles I and a Royalist commander during the English Civil War.

== Life ==
Thomas Tyldesley was born on 3 September 1612 at Woodplumpton, the eldest of the six children of Edward Tyldesley (1582–1621) of Morleys Hall, Astley, in the parish of Leigh and his wife Elizabeth Preston of Holker Hall. He entered Gray's Inn intending to follow a career of law. Later he became a professional soldier and served in the Thirty Years' War in Germany. He married Frances, elder daughter of Ralph Standish in 1634 and they had three sons and seven daughters. His family were recusants and his grandmother arranged a pension for priest, Benedictine martyr Ambrose Barlow so that he could secretly carry out priestly duties, offering masses in secret in the homes of Catholics in the Leigh parish. Barlow was arrested at Morleys Hall during such a service. His aunt, Elizabeth Tyldesley, was abbess of the Poor Clares at Gravelines in the Spanish Netherlands from 1610 to 1654. His annual landed income, mostly from tithes purchased from the Urmstons of Westleigh, was £2050 in 1641.

Tyldesley served King Charles I as lieutenant colonel at the Battle of Edgehill, after raising Regiments of Horse, Foot and Dragoons, and at the desperate storming of Burton-on-Trent over a bridge of 36 arches, received the honour of Knighthood. Afterwards he served in all three of the Civil Wars as a commander of some importance. He was present with Prince Rupert of the Rhine at the Bolton Massacre in 1644. He was Governor of Lichfield and followed the fortune of the Crown through the Wars of the Three Kingdoms and never surrendered to the Parliamentarians. He was killed in action on 25 August 1651 commanding as Major General under the Earl of Derby during the Battle of Wigan Lane. He was buried at his family chapel at Leigh Parish Church.

== In Literature ==
Letitia Elizabeth Landon's poetical illustration Sir Thomas Tyldesley was published in Fisher's Drawing Room Scrap Book, 1839 to the above portrait engraved by John Cochran.
