= Astley, Greater Manchester =

Village in Greater Manchester, England

Astley
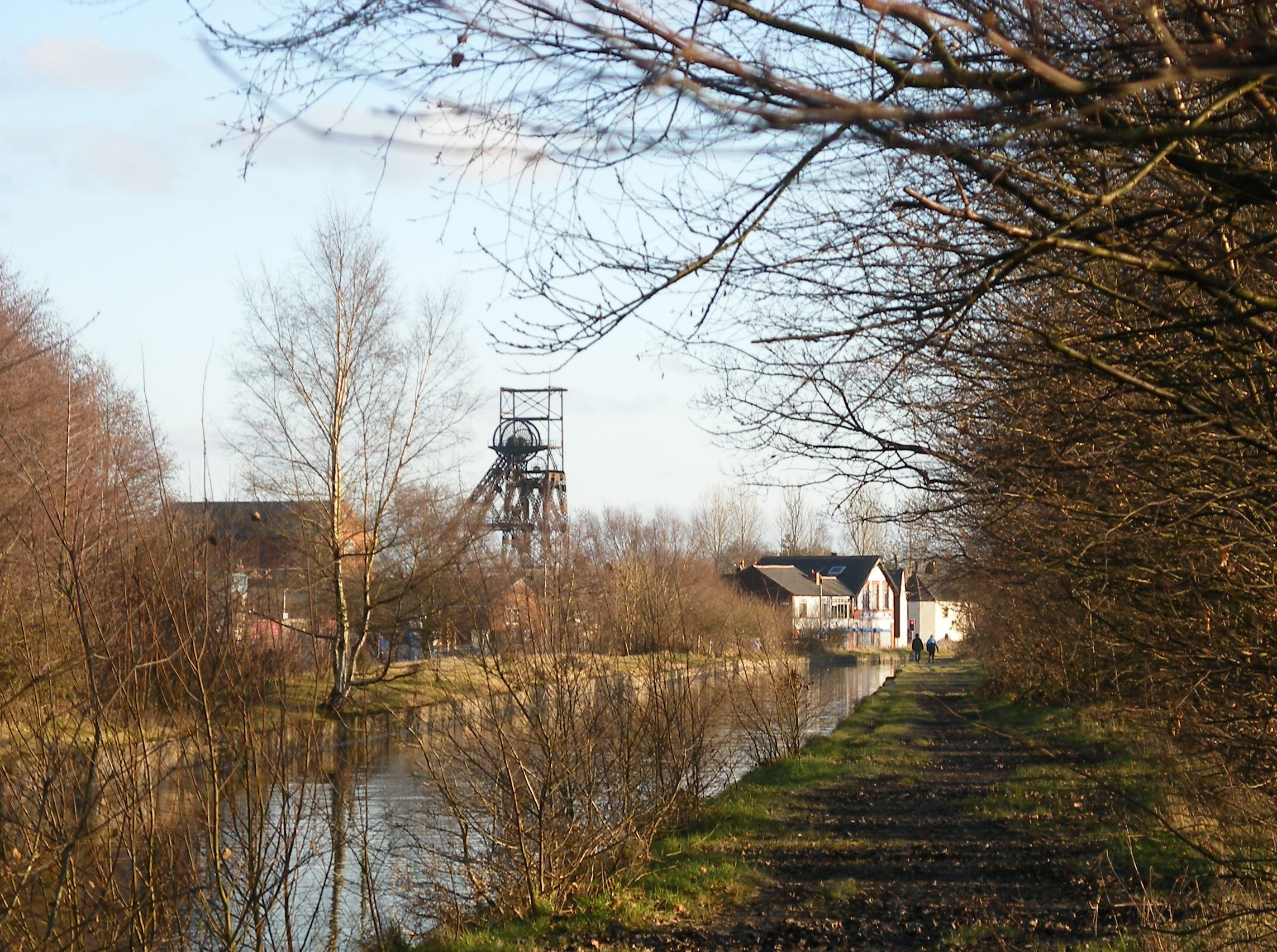
- Bridgewater Canal and Astley Green pithead

- Location within Greater Manchester
- Population: 11,270
- OS grid reference: SD699006
  - London: 163 mi (262 km) SE
- Metropolitan borough: Wigan
- Metropolitan county: Greater Manchester
- Region: North West
- Country: England
- Sovereign state: United Kingdom
- Post town: MANCHESTER
- Postcode district: M29
- Dialling code: 01942/0161
- Police: Greater Manchester
- Fire: Greater Manchester
- Ambulance: North West
- UK Parliament: Worsley and Eccles

Astley is a village at the far-eastern edge of the Metropolitan Borough of Wigan, Greater Manchester, England. It borders Tyldesley to the north, Boothstown and Mosley Common to the East and Chat Moss to the South.

Within the boundaries of the historic county of Lancashire, it is crossed by the Bridgewater Canal and the A580 East Lancashire Road on the Wigan/Salford Borough boundary border. Continuous with Tyldesley, it is between Wigan and Manchester, both 8 miles (13 km) away. Astley is part of the Worsley & Eccles UK Parliament Constituency. Astley Mosley Common ward had a population of 11,270 at the 2011 Census.

Astley's name is Old English, indicating Anglo-Saxon settlement. It means either "east (of) Leigh", or ēastlēah the "eastern wood or clearing". Throughout the Middle Ages, Astley constituted a township within the parish of Leigh and hundred of West Derby. Astley appears in written form as Asteleghe in 1210, when its lord of the manor granted land to the religious order of Premonstratensian canons at Cockersand Abbey.

Medieval and Early Modern Astley is distinguished by the dignitaries who occupied Damhouse, the local manor house around which a settlement expanded. The Bridgewater Canal reached Astley in 1795, and the Liverpool and Manchester Railway in 1830. The Industrial Revolution introduced the factory system when the village's cotton mill was built in 1833. Coal mining became an important industry.

Mining subsidence and a decline in coal production led to a reduction in the industry in the mid-20th century; its cotton mill closed in 1955, and the last coal was brought to the surface in 1970. Astley Green Colliery Museum houses collections of Astley's industrial heritage.

== History ==
=== Toponymy ===
Astley is of Old English derivation, and means "East Leigh", a reference to its position in relation to Leigh. Leigh is derived from leah, meaning a "wood", a "clearing" or a "meadow". The earliest written record of Astley was in documents dated 1210 when it appeared as the Middle English Asteleghe. Other archaic spellings include Asteleye (1292) and Astlegh (14th and 15th centuries).

=== Early history ===
The earliest evidence of human activity in the area is the remains of a Roman road which served as the route between Roman camps at Coccium (Wigan) and Mamucium (Manchester). The road ran to the north of Astley, past Keeper Delph and through Tyldesley. Evidence for the presence of Anglo-Saxons in the sparsely populated, heavily wooded and isolated region is provided by place names incorporating the Old English suffix leah, such as in Leigh, Tyldesley, Shakerley and Astley.

=== Manor ===
Astley emerged during the Early Middle Ages as a township in the parish of Leigh. It was mentioned in documents in 1210, when Hugh of Tyldesley, Lord of the Manors of Tyldesley and Astley, granted land to Cockersand Abbey. In 1212, he was recorded as tenant of Astley Hall, the manor house for both Astley and Tyldesley, located just inside the Tyldesley township. After his death, his son Henry inherited the manors. He was succeeded by his son, another Henry, who, when he died in 1301, divided the lands between three of his six sons. It is from this division that the manors of Astley and Tyldesley were separated. Tyldesleys lived at the Astley manor until April 1353 when Richard Radcliff bought it for 100 marks. The Radcliffs remained there until 1561 when William Radcliff died childless and the land passed to his half-sister Anne, who married Gilbert Gerard.

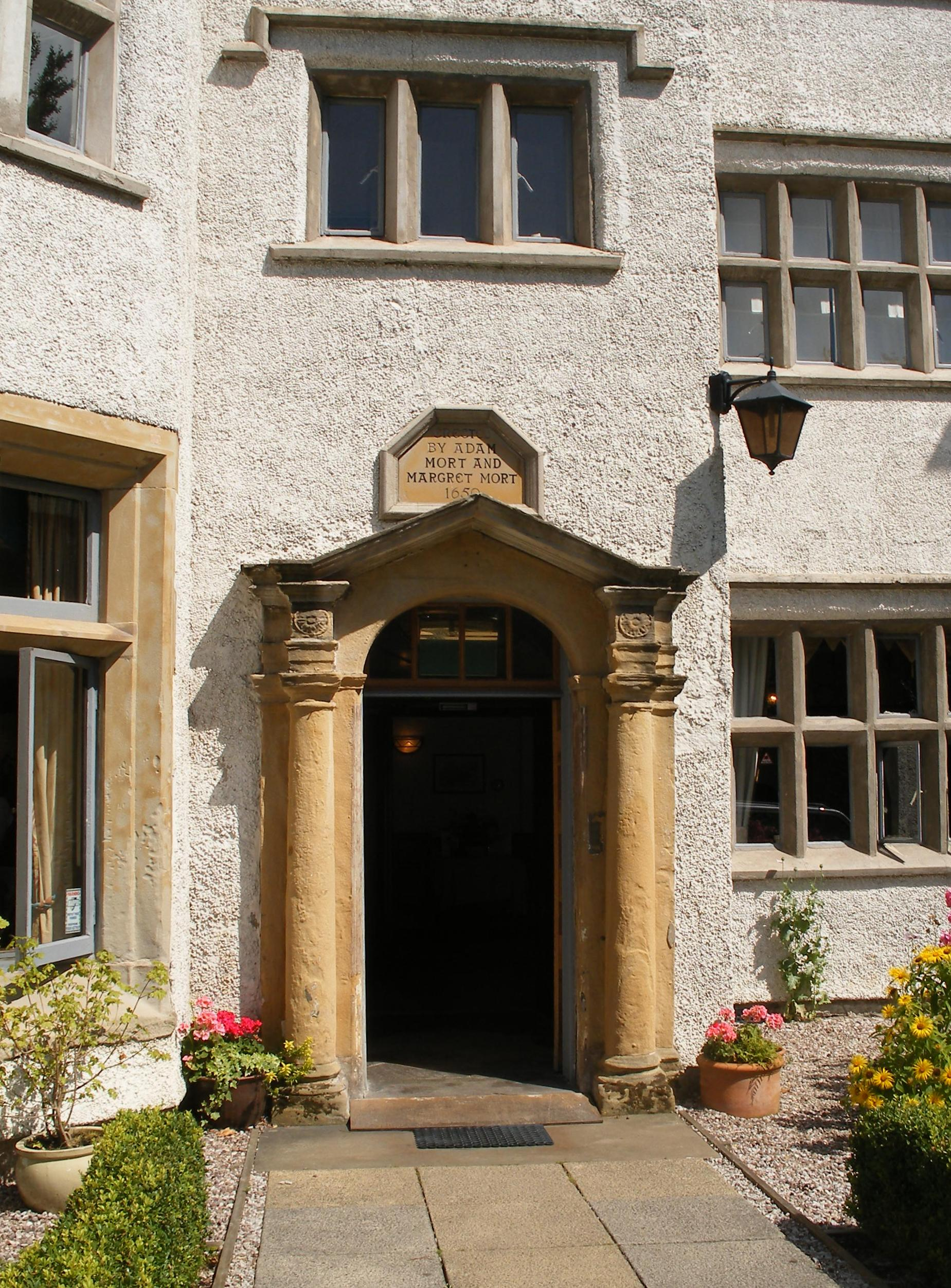
The doorway of Damhouse in Astley. The inscription over the lintel reads, "Erected by Adam Mort and Margret Mort 1650".

In 1606 Adam Mort bought the manor house and land in Astley. He was a wealthy man who built the first Astley Chapel as a chapel of ease for the parish church in Leigh. The chapel was consecrated in 1631, the year that he died. He built a grammar school that stood for over 200 years until 1833, when it was demolished and rebuilt. Adam Mort's grandson, also Adam, rebuilt Damhouse in 1650 and his initials are carved in the plaque over the front door. The stone and timber structure was named from the stream which was dammed to supply water to a waterwheel powering a corn mill near the house. It is possible the hall was once surrounded by a moat.

Adam Mort's descendants continued to support the chapel and school and remained at Damhouse until 1734 when it was bought by Thomas Sutton. After Sutton's death in 1752 the house was inherited by Thomas Froggatt of Bakewell who contributed to rebuilding the chapel in 1760. Froggatt's descendants owned Damhouse until 1800 when it was leased to tenants, one of whom was George Ormerod, owner of the Banks Estate in Tyldesley who gave land for its churchyard and church school. In 1839 the house became the property of Captain Adam Durie of Craig Lascar by marriage to Sarah Froggatt. Damhouse was dilapidated when the Duries moved in. Captain Durie gave land to build a school on Church Road. After his death in 1843 his widow, Sarah, married Colonel Malcolm Nugent Ross. The Ross's Arms public house at Higher Green is named in his honour. The Durie's daughter Katharine, who married first, Henry Davenport and second Sir Edward Robert Weatherall, became lady of the manor after her mother's death but the family was in financial difficulties and the house and estate sold in November 1889.

The Leigh Hospital Board bought Damhouse in 1893 for use as a sanatorium dealing with cases of diphtheria, scarlet fever and, in 1947, poliomyelitis. Two bombs fell close to the hospital during the Second World War. It became a general hospital in 1948 dealing with chronically ill and geriatric patients and closed in 1994.

=== Industrial Revolution ===
Astley became more industrialised during the early 19th century, but not so much as neighbouring Leigh, Tyldesley and Boothstown. A factory was built by James and Robert Arrowsmith on Peel Lane at Astley Green, near the Bridgewater Canal in 1833. Until then, agriculture and cottage spinning and weaving had been the main economic activities. Fustians, muslins and, after 1827, silk were woven in the area. Handloom weaving declined after the cotton factory was built. Arrowsmith's factory lasted until 1955, when mining subsidence damaged its foundations and it was demolished, ending Astley's link with the textile industry.

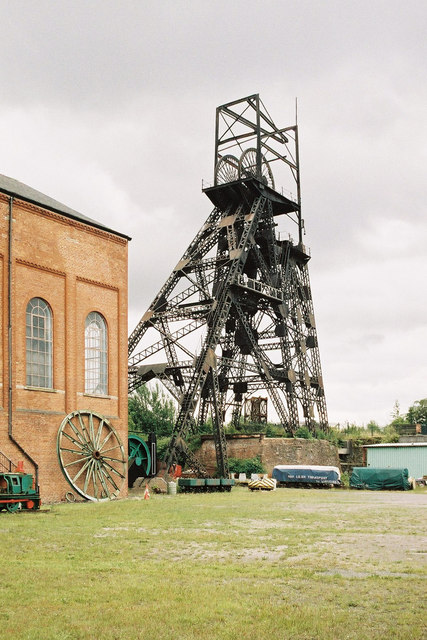
Astley Green pit head gear and engine house

Astley on the Lancashire Coalfield and had several coal mines within its boundaries. On a map of 1768, a lane leading to Nook and Gin Pit Collieries was called the Coal Road and later North Coal Pit Lane. Gin Pit's name alludes a method of coal mining, raising coal using a horse gin. An early colliery at Cross Hillock was abandoned in 1886 because of flooding. Samuel Jackson developed the mines that became Astley and Tyldesley Collieries between Astley and Tyldesley. Peat works were opened close to Astley railway station by the Astley Peat Moss Litter Company Limited in 1888.

On 7 May 1908 the Pilkington Colliery Company started sinking No 1 Shaft of Astley Green Colliery near the Bridgewater Canal. A colliery railway moved coal from the screens to the Liverpool and Manchester Railway but some coal was transported to power stations at Trafford Park and Stretford using the Bridgewater Canal. Pit head baths, a canteen and medical centre designed for the Miners' Welfare Committee by architect C. Kemp, were built in 1935–36 at a cost of over £24,000 (£1.48 million as of 2025). There was a mining accident at Astley Green on 7 June 1939 when five men including the manager died in an explosion of firedamp. Women, "pit brow lasses", worked on the screens sorting coal from rock until 1955. The last coal was wound on 3 April 1970.

The headgear at Astley Green Colliery Museum remains a landmark in the 21st century. It is made from wrought-iron lattice girders with rivetted plates at all the joints, three wheels, two large and one small, are mounted at the top. Built by Head Wrightson of Stockton-on-Tees in 1912, it is nearly 98 feet (30 m) high. In the winding house is a twin tandem compound steam engine made by Yates and Thom of Blackburn who also supplied 16 Lancashire boilers.

== Governance ==
Historically, Astley formed part of the Hundred of West Derby, a judicial division of southwest Lancashire. It was one of six townships or vills that made up the ancient ecclesiastical parish of Leigh. It was also a chapelry in Leigh parish. The townships existed before the parish. Under the terms of the Poor Law Amendment Act 1834, the townships formed the Leigh Poor Law Union established on 26 January 1837, comprising the whole of the ancient parish and part of Winwick. There were workhouses in Pennington, Culcheth, Tyldesley and Lowton, but Leigh Union workhouse at Atherleigh replaced them in the 1850s. In 1866 Astley became a separate civil parish, in 1894 the civil parishes of Astley, Culcheth, Kenyon and Lowton became part of Leigh Rural District which lasted until it was dissolved. On 1 October 1933 the parish was abolished and merged with Tyldesley cum Shakerley and Astley was incorporated into the Tyldesley Urban District. In 1931 the parish had a population of 4584. The urban district was abolished in 1974 under the Local Government Act 1972, and Astley became part of the Metropolitan Borough of Wigan, a local government district of the metropolitan county of Greater Manchester. For most of its existence in Wigan borough up to revisions in 2004, Astley was part of the "Bedford-Astley" ward joining it with rural land in the Bedford area south of Leigh.

Since 2004 Astley and Mosley Common form an electoral ward of the Metropolitan Borough of Wigan. The ward elects three councillors to the 75-member metropolitan borough council. As of 2012, the Astley Mosley Common ward is represented by three Labour councillors.

From 1983 to 2010, Astley, along with neighbouring Tyldesley, was part of the Worsley parliamentary constituency, joining it with the western half of the City of Salford. Despite including more Conservative areas such as Worsley and Boothstown, this was a safe Labour seat held by Terry Lewis up to 2005, followed by Barbara Keeley, who remained MP for its successor Worsley and Eccles South. However, a review of parliamentary representation in Greater Manchester, the Boundary Commission recommended that Astley and Tyldesley should be part of the Leigh constituency at the 2010 general election. At the 2010 Election Andy Burnham retained the Leigh seat with 24,295 votes and a majority of 15,011, representing 51.3% of the vote. Burnham was re-elected MP for the Leigh constituency in 2015 with 24,312 votes which was 53.9% of the total vote cast. Jo Platt, representing Labour, was elected in 2017 with 26,347 votes which was 56.2% of the total votes cast. Leigh was gained by the Conservatives in the 2019 general election, and represented by James Grundy until he retired at the 2024 General Election when, following further constituency boundary changes, it became part of the new Leigh and Atherton seat, which was regained by Jo Platt, its present MP.

== Geography ==
Astley

Climate chart (precipitation, max. and min. temperature)
| J | F | M | A | M | J | J | A | S | O | N | D |
| 70 8 2 | 70 8 2 | 50 10 3 | 63 13 5 | 51 16 8 | 58 19 10 | 54 21 12 | 69 21 12 | 63 18 10 | 88 14 7 | 82 10 4 | 79 7 2 |
- █ Average max. and min. temperatures in °C
- █ Precipitation totals in mm
Imperial conversion
| J | F | M | A | M | J | J | A | S | O | N | D |
| 2.8 46 36 | 2.8 46 36 | 2 50 37 | 2.5 55 41 | 2 61 46 | 2.3 66 50 | 2.1 70 54 | 2.7 70 54 | 2.5 64 50 | 3.5 57 45 | 3.2 50 39 | 3.1 45 36 |
- █ Average max. and min. temperatures in °F
- █ Precipitation totals in inches

At 53°30′3″N 2°26′44″W (53.5008°, −2.4454°), and 163 miles (262 km) northwest of central London, Astley is on the northern side of the Chat Moss bog, about 177 feet (54 m) above sea level. It forms a continuous urban area with Tyldesley to the north, and, according to the Office for National Statistics, is a part of the Greater Manchester Urban Area, the United Kingdom's second largest built-up urban area.

Astley is 8.3 miles (13.4 km) west-northwest of Manchester city centre, and 0.75 miles (1.2 km) north of the Bridgewater Canal, which straddles the village's southern hinterland from east-to-west. Astley is crossed east-to-west by the A572 and A580 roads. The hamlet of Astley Green lines a straight road leading southwards through Chat Moss, to the former Astley railway station, which is 2 miles (3.2 km) south of the village. Astley spans an area of 2,685 acres (10.87 km^{2}), of which 1,000 acres (4 km^{2}) is peat bog. Astley and Bedford Mosses is one of the last surviving fragments of Chat Moss, most of which has been drained for agriculture or lost through peat removal. It occupies a 33-hectare (82-acre) site between Astley and the Liverpool and Manchester Railway. It has been a Site of Special Scientific Interest (SSSI) since 1989. Astley Moss is crossed by the Astley Brook and Moss Brook, tributaries to the Glaze Brook and the River Mersey.

The underlying geology consists of the Permo-Triassic New Red Sandstone in the south, and the Middle Coal Measures of the Manchester Coalfield to the north. The upper soils are a mixture of clay and sand, with a subsoil of clay. The Astley area encompasses smaller, suburban and semi-outlying areas, including Blackmoor, Astley Green, Gin Pit and Cross Hillock. The isolated hamlet of terraced houses at Gin Pit was built by the Astley and Tyldesley Collieries Company. Peace Street, Lord Street and Maden Street were named after directors of the company.

== Demography ==
Population growth in Astley from 1881 to 1931
| Year | 1881 | 1891 | 1901 | 1911 | 1921 | 1931 |
|---|---|---|---|---|---|---|
| Population | 2,669 | 2,552 | 2,823 | 3,556 | 3,902 | 4,584 |
Astley CP/Ch

== Economy ==
Before deindustrialisation in the late 20th century, Astley's economy was linked with the textile industry and coal mines which developed during the Industrial Revolution. Now the main concentration of employment is at the Chaddock Lane Industrial Estate on either side of the A572 road between Astley and the East Lancashire Road.

Since the early 1980s, much of the area between Tyldesley and Astley has been built on for housing. Indicators show that the township has a strong housing market, with a high owner occupancy rate of almost 80%. Parts of Astley are among the 5% least deprived areas in the Metropolitan Borough of Wigan, whilst parts of the Blackmoor area, where social housing is concentrated, are within the 10–20% most deprived neighbourhoods nationally. Facilities in the village include a small local shopping centre at Blackmoor. The development of Astley Green Colliery Museum and the heritage centre at Damhouse attract visitors interested in the area's heritage.

== Landmarks ==
The site of Astley Green Colliery Museum, a scheduled ancient monument, retains its engine house and headgear, a prominent feature that can be seen from around the local area.

Damhouse, the former manor house, is a listed building, parts of which were dated to 1595 by the Greater Manchester Archaeological Unit. The house was extended in 1650. In 1999, Morts Astley Heritage Trust was formed to preserve Damhouse and open the surrounding woodland to the public. It is situated within the Astley Village conservation area.

Morleys Hall lies on part of the lands donated to Cockersand Abbey by Hugh Tyldesley in 1210. It was owned by the Morleys until 1431, then subsequently by the Leylands. In 1540 it was described as being largely built of timber on stone foundations and surrounded by a moat. It was rebuilt in 1804, but parts of the old hall survive. Edward Tyldesley of Wardley Hall married Anne Leyland and inherited Morleys in 1564. Their granddaughter, Elizabeth Tyldesley, became abbess of the Convent of Poor Clares at Gravelines in the Spanish Netherlands. Sir Thomas Tyldesley was the most famous of this line of the family, having been a Cavalier commander and supporter of Charles II, King of England during the English Civil War. He died in the Battle of Wigan Lane and is buried at the Church of St Mary the Virgin, Leigh. The hall passed through the Legh and Wilkinson families until it was sold to Tyldesley Urban District Council and the land used for a sewage works. The hall is a private residence.

== Transport ==
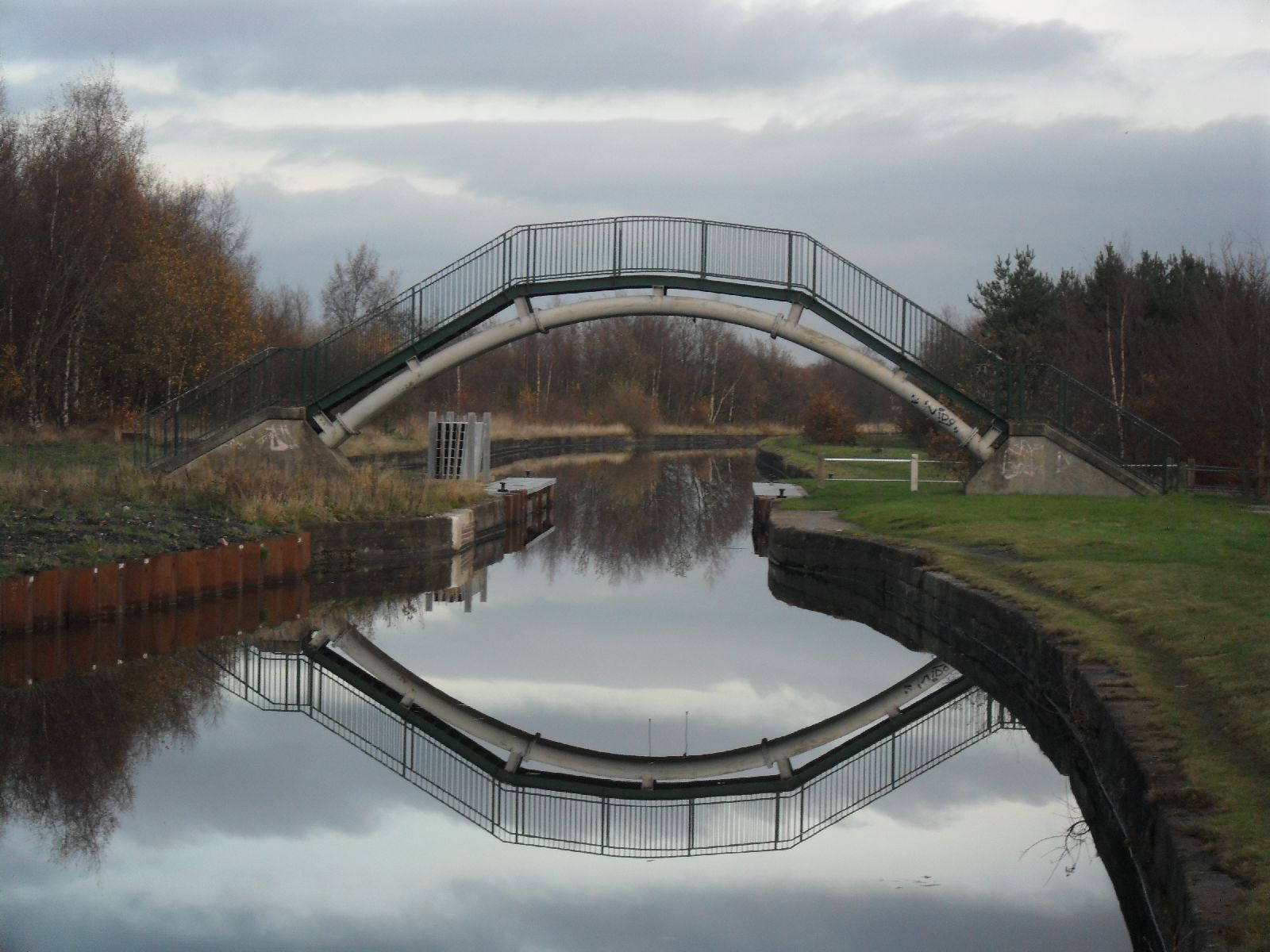
A footbridge over the Bridgewater Canal near Astley Green

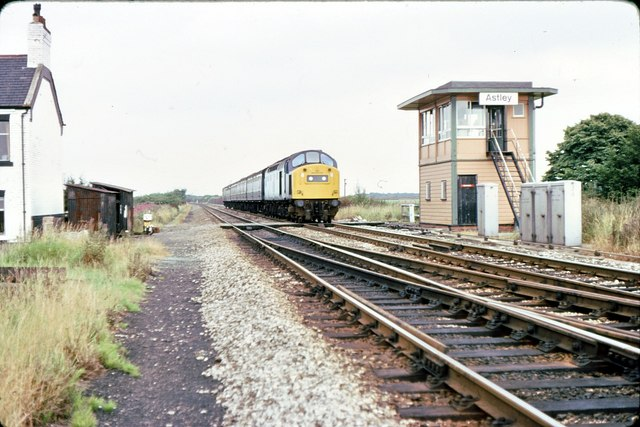
Astley signal box and level crossing over the Liverpool and Manchester Railway in 1979

Public transport in Astley is co-ordinated by Transport for Greater Manchester. Bus services operate to Farnworth, the Trafford Centre, Tyldesley, Atherton, Wigan and Manchester, operated by Diamond Bus North West and Go North West for the Bee Network. Major A roads link Astley with other settlements, including the A580 "East Lancashire Road", which opened in 1934 bisecting the village. Its dual carriageway crosses the Bridgewater Canal on a bridge at Morleys. The A572 road connects Astley and Worsley and the A5082 road heads north east to Tyldesley.

By 1795, the original Bridgewater Canal from Worsley to Manchester had proved an economic success, prompting its owner, Francis Egerton, 3rd Duke of Bridgewater, to seek powers to extend it route to Leigh via Astley. The Duke's plans were approved, despite opposition from the local population. Canal traffic brought trade to Astley Green where the Hope and Anchor Inn (now the Boathouse) was built with stabling for horses that pulled the barges. The original canal bridge built to connect Lower and Higher Green lasted until 1904, when it was replaced. The second bridge was replaced in 1920 by an iron bridge, which could be raised to counter the effects of mining subsidence. A boatyard was established by Lingard's Bridge.

The Liverpool and Manchester Railway of 1830 crosses Astley Moss. It was built on a raft of branches and cotton bales to prevent the track sinking into Chat Moss. The early engines reached speeds of 25 mph (40 km/h). The first passengers told the driver where they wished to alight until Astley railway station was built in the mid-1840s. The railway was distant from the village and early travellers came on horseback or in carriages.

An early tramway ran to a wharf on the Bridgewater Canal at Marsland Green and a mineral railway system linked Gin Pit Colliery to the Tyldesley Loopline at Jackson's sidings and Bedford Colliery and Speakman's Sidings. The colliery locomotives were named after Gin Pit Colliery's company directors.

== Education ==
Adam Mort established a grammar school by the chapel in 1631 which was in use until 1833. Children from poor families were admitted free and those who could afford to pay covered the costs. Mort's School closed in 1894. In 1832 children were taught in a barn at the vicarage, the curate, Alfred Hewlett, improved it and the chapel was used as a classroom. A national school built by subscription on land donated by Captain Durie of Damhouse opened in November 1841. Meanleys Infant School was opened at Gin Pit in 1904 to serve the mining community that had grown up by there. Other schools were built at Ellesmere Street and Marsland Green.

Schools in Astley
| School | Locality | Description | Website |
|---|---|---|---|
| St. Stephen's C.E. Primary | Astley | Primary school | website |
| Tyldesley Primary | Astley | Primary school | website |
| St. Ambrose Barlow Catholic Primary | Astley | Primary school | website |
| Holy Family Roman Catholic Primary | Boothstown | Primary school | website |
| St Mary's Catholic High | Astley | Secondary school | website |

== Religion ==
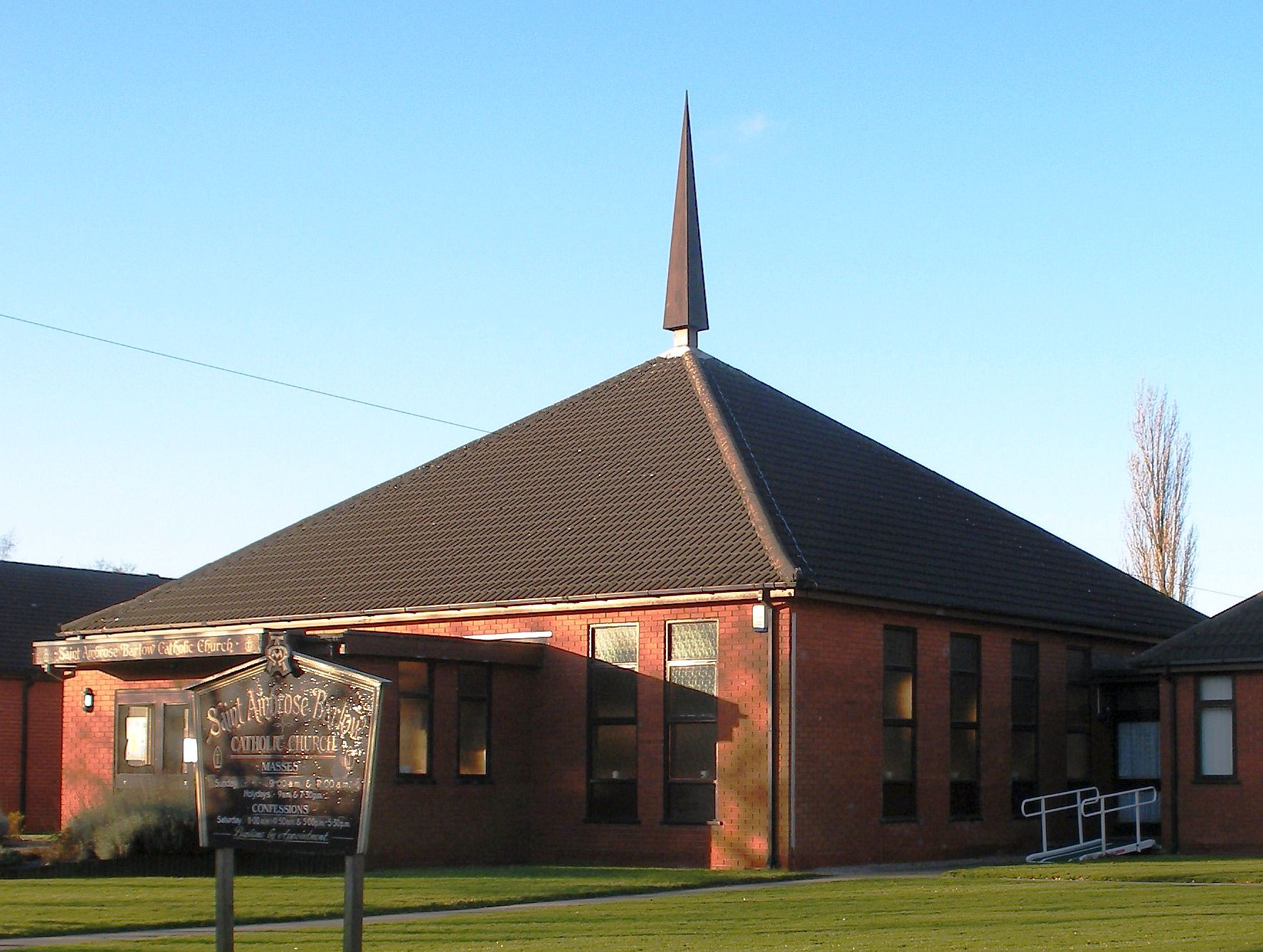
St Ambrose Barlow Church

Adam Mort built Astley Chapel which was completed in 1630 and consecrated 3 August 1631. It was the first of three chapels in Astley, and the first chapel of ease of Leigh parish church. Astley Chapel was rebuilt in 1760; Thomas Froggatt gave a contribution towards the cost. The new church was built of brick and measured 54 ft 6 in (16.61 m) in length and 36 ft (11 m) in width and held 170 people and was enlarged in 1834, 1842 and 1847. It had a small chancel and its embattled western tower contained a single bell. The church, dedicated to Saint Stephen, was destroyed by arson on 18 June 1961. Also destroyed was the book collection, acquired by the Morts, memorials to the old families and the First and Second World War memorials. It was too severely damaged to restore and a third church has been built on a nearby site.

Prominent Catholic families in the Leigh parish did not abandon the Catholic faith after the English Reformation despite penalties levied on papists. Secret Roman Catholic masses were held in private homes, including Morleys Hall, home of the Tyldesleys. On Easter Sunday 1641, the Catholic priest, Ambrose Barlow was arrested during a service at Morleys Hall at the instigation of the vicar of Leigh. He was taken to Lancaster Castle, tried as a traitor and executed on 10 September 1641. He was canonised by the Roman Catholic Church as one of the Forty Martyrs of England and Wales. A church and school bear his name. The St Ambrose Barlow parish was formed in 1965 and the church was built in 1981. St Ambrose Barlow parish is in the Leigh Pastoral Area in the Roman Catholic Archdiocese of Liverpool.

There were two Methodist churches but one in Lower Green closed in 2009. Astley Unitarian Chapel was demolished and the site built on. Gin Pit School doubled as a chapel for Wesleyan Methodists.

== Sport ==
Astley and Tyldesley Miners' Welfare Club at Gin Pit is the venue for several sporting groups including Astley and Tyldesley Football Club, Astley and Tyldesley Cricket Club and the Astley and Tyldesley Roadrunners. The Astley and Tyldesley Cycle Speedway Club was formed in 1989 and built a race track at the Miners' Welfare Club in 1991.

== Public services ==
Astley is policed by the Greater Manchester Police force from Atherton Police Station, which covers Atherton, Tyldesley, Astley and Mosley Common. The statutory emergency fire and rescue service is provided by the Greater Manchester Fire and Rescue Service, from Leigh and Atherton fire stations. Hospital services are provided by the Wrightington, Wigan and Leigh NHS Foundation Trust who provide an Accident and Emergency service at Wigan Hospital and outpatient clinics at Leigh Infirmary. Health services in the Wigan borough are provided by the Wigan Borough Clinical Commissioning Group. Waste management is co-ordinated by Wigan Metropolitan Council, which is a statutory waste disposal authority in its own right. Astley's Distribution Network Operator for electricity is Electricity North West Ltd. United Utilities manages Astley's drinking and waste water.

== See also ==
- List of mills in Wigan
- List of collieries in Astley and Tyldesley
- Listed buildings in Astley, Greater Manchester
