= Convent of Poor Clares, Gravelines =

Community of English nuns

Coordinates: 51.977°N 2.728°W

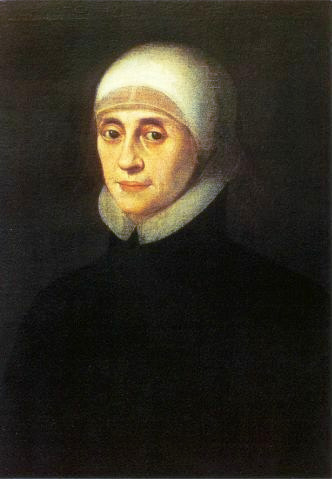
Venerable Mary Ward, I.B.V.M., (1585–1645), who founded the community in 1607.

The Convent of Poor Clares at Gravelines in the Spanish Netherlands, now northern France, was a community of English nuns of the Order of St. Clare, commonly called "Poor Clares", which was founded in 1607 by Mary Ward. The order of Poor Clares was founded in 1212 by Saint Clare of Assisi as the Second Order of the Franciscan movement. It is an enclosed religious order which follows an austere lifestyle. After the Reformation and its consequence, the Dissolution of the Monasteries between 1536 and 1541 by Henry VIII, the only opportunity for recusant English women to enter religious life was to leave the country and join a community overseas.

In 1606 Ward departed England to enter the Poor Clare community at St-Omer, in the Spanish Netherlands, where she was admitted as a lay sister. She left St-Omer the following year to found a new house for English women in Gravelines, which she did using much of her own dowry. The convent was built within the town walls of Gravelines. The Chronicle of Gravelines, the journal of the community's history kept by the nuns, described the buildings as unfinished when they first arrived, with no furniture and little food. They lived in temporary accommodations but kept a monastic schedule as best they could, attending Mass in the local church, until the house was completed.

Once the structure was complete, the community established the formal enclosure, with a grille in the door between the cloister and the parlor where visitors were received. Inside, conditions were austere: the nuns wore rough, woollen habits, slept on straw mattresses, ate meat only at Christmas, spoke only when necessary and with permission, and spent much of the day in silent prayer and contemplation. In keeping with the rule of St. Clare, the nuns supported themselves through the sale of handicrafts, such as vestments, but survived primarily on the donations of the people of the city.

Not suited to the contemplative life, Mary Ward left Gravelines in 1609, and founded the Sisters of Loreto in St-Omer, which became an international religious congregation dedicated to education. Margaret Radcliffe and her three sisters joined the community starting in 1606.

Elizabeth Tyldesley, Mother Clare Mary Ann was elected its abbess in 1615, serving until her death in 1654. Elizabeth Evelinge joined the community in 1620 and she was soon joined by Mary and Rose Evelinge who are thought to be her sisters. The success of the convent under Tyldesley's leadership led to the founding of dependent communities at Dunkirk in 1625, Aire-sur-la-Lys in 1629 and Rouen in 1644, at least one of which was composed of women from Ireland.

In 1795 the nuns from all four houses were expelled by the forces of the French Revolutionary Army in the course of its occupation of the Low Countries and the nuns returned to England. The nuns of Aire-sur-la-Lys brought many possessions, including part of their library. The combined communities moved first to Haggerston Castle in Northumberland and in 1807 to Scorton Hall in North Yorkshire. The nuns established St Clare's Abbey in Darlington in 1857 and in 2007 the community merged with the Poor Clares at Much Birch in Herefordshire, at which time they donated part of their library to Durham University.
