= Barlow Hall =

Listed country house in Manchester, England

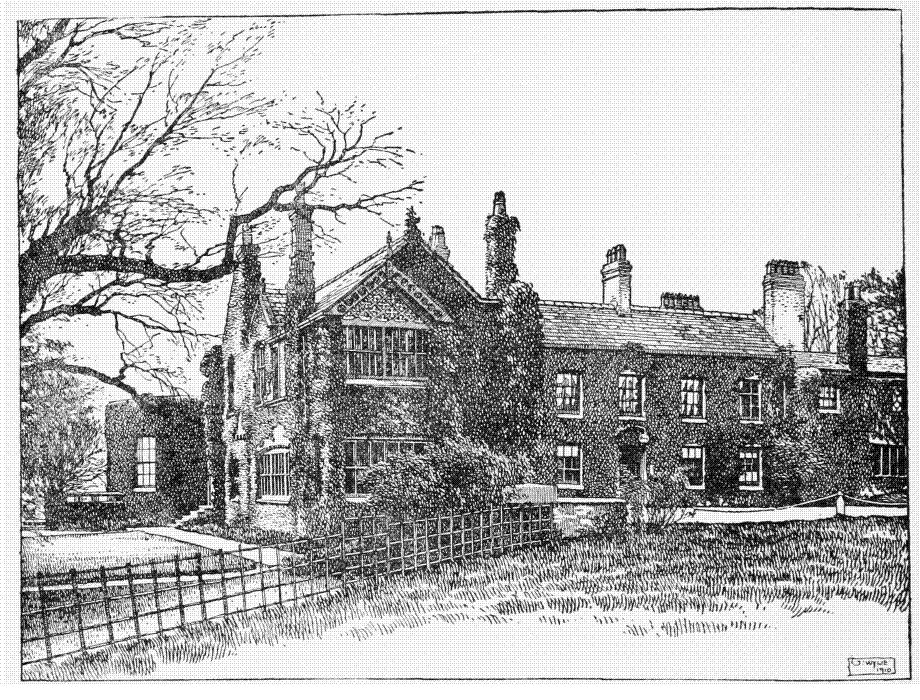
- Barlow Hall, 1910

General information
- Address: 55 Godbert Avenue, Manchester, M21 7JD
- Coordinates: 53.42498°N 2.26883°W
- Year(s) built: 16th century, with later additions
- Designations

Listed Building – Grade II
- Official name: Barlow Hall
- Designated: 3 October 1974
- Reference no.: 1197800

Website
- Official website

Barlow Hall is an ancient manor house and Grade II listed building in Chorlton-cum-Hardy in the suburbs of Manchester, England. A house has existed on the site since at least the 13th century, but the present building dates back no further than the 16th century (rebuilt in 1584), with later additions.

The house was for a long time the property of the Barlow family, whose estates were sold to the Egertons in 1785. It was the birthplace in 1585 of Ambrose Barlow, a Roman Catholic priest hanged at Lancaster Castle in 1641.

Since 1903 it has been the home of Chorlton-cum-Hardy Golf Club.

== See also ==
- Listed buildings in Manchester-M21
