= Battle of Burton Bridge (1643) =

Battle during the First English Civil War

Coordinates: 52.8067°N 1.6238°W

- Part of the First English Civil War
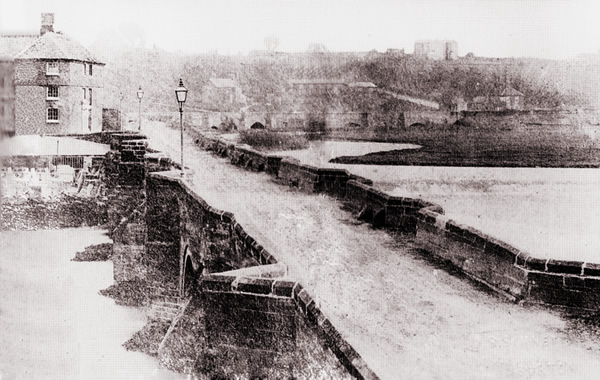
- An early photograph of the medieval Burton Bridge looking from the town (Parliamentarian) side of the river
Date	4 July 1643
Location	Burton upon Trent
Result	Royalist victory

Belligerents
Royalists	Parliamentarians

Commanders and leaders
Henrietta Maria; Thomas Tyldesley	Richard Houghton (POW); Thomas Sanders (POW)

Strength
Unknown	200 infantry 60 dragoons 1 cannon

Staffordshire and Burton

The Battle of Burton Bridge was fought between Royalist and Parliamentarian forces at Burton upon Trent on 4 July 1643 during the First English Civil War. By the time of the battle, the town, which had at various times been held by both sides, was garrisoned by a Parliamentarian unit under the command of Captain Thomas Sanders and the town's military governor, Colonel Richard Houghton. The key river crossing at Burton was desired by Queen Henrietta Maria, who was proceeding southwards from Yorkshire with a convoy of supplies destined for King Charles I at Oxford. The Royalists, led by Colonel Thomas Tyldesley, launched a cavalry charge across the bridge which succeeded in defeating the Parliamentarians and capturing most of their officers, including Sanders and Houghton. The Queen's convoy proceeded on its way south to Oxford, with Tyldesley receiving a knighthood and a promotion in recognition of his victory. Burton changed hands several more times during the course of the war, before finally coming under Parliamentarian control in 1646.

== Background ==
The county of Staffordshire, several days travel from the main seat of power in London, had a long-standing disinclination to paying taxes and levies imposed by the King. James I's Privy Council was forced to write to the county's Justices of the Peace for their failure to raise a single penny to support the King's campaign to reclaim the Palatinate in Germany for his son-in-law Frederick V in the 1620s. The county was also slow to pay Charles I's ship money, which began to be levied (in defiance of the Parliament) on the inland counties in 1634 and saw much resistance. Open dissent against the King's decrees occurred in 1640 in objection to the levying of 300 men from the county for the King's campaign against the Scots. Riots took place in Uttoxeter, with an armed guard having to be formed to prevent the levy from deserting.

Upon the outbreak of the Civil War in 1642, the town of Burton was largely sympathetic to the Parliamentarian cause. This was probably, in part, due to the large Puritan following in the town and Staffordshire's general disapproval of the High Church practices of the then Archbishop of Canterbury William Laud (who was later executed for his opposition of Puritanism).

== Early-war Burton ==
Burton's river crossing, a 36-arched medieval structure known as "Burton Bridge", was desirable to both sides, being described as "the only passage over the Trent and Dove to the North", and was positioned between the Royalist towns of Lichfield, Tutbury, and Ashby-de-la-Zouch and Parliamentarian Stafford and Derby. Despite this strategic location the town was unfortified and possessed few natural defences. Burton would change hands at least a dozen times during the course of the war, first coming to the attention of the Royalists when the Earl of Chesterfield used it as a rendezvous for his forces in late 1642. Chesterfield withdrew his forces to Lichfield for the winter, garrisoning the cathedral, which would become the scene of much fighting during the war. There were rumours prior to the war that the town held secret supplies of gunpowder for a Catholic rebellion; these were investigated by Lord Paget (who began the war as a Parliamentarian, switched allegiance to the King in 1642, before returning to the side of Parliament in 1644) and found to be false, though the explosion of a store of gunpowder did occur in 1643, causing the roof of St Modwen's Church to be destroyed.

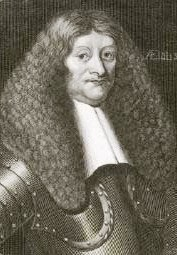
Sir John Gell

East Staffordshire's strategic importance was heightened by its position at the boundary of Royalist and Parliamentarian garrisons in the region. Burton had come to Roundhead attention in early 1643 after the establishment of a garrison at nearby Derby by the county committee leader, Sir John Gell. In February, Gell placed a garrison across the county border at Burton, consisting of an infantry company under Dutch Major Johannes Molanus, but withdrew it less than a month later to assist in an attack on Newark.

Parliament's forces in Staffordshire and Warwickshire were initially under the command of Lord Brooke, but after his death during the successful siege of Lichfield Cathedral in March 1643, Gell was appointed as his replacement. Shortly thereafter, Gell, whose forces amounted to around 1,000 infantry, a few horse and 300 partially armed Staffordshire moorlanders, met with Sir William Brereton, Commander-in-Chief of Cheshire, to organise an attack upon Stafford. This became known to the Royalists and the Earl of Northampton was sent with two fast-moving cavalry regiments to thwart Gell and Brereton's plan. Northampton met with troops led by Henry Hastings (later Lord Loughborough) and garrisoned Tamworth, before engaging Gell at the inconclusive Battle of Hopton Heath, during which Northampton was killed.

During this time, Queen Henrietta Maria landed at Bridlington, Yorkshire, with a supply of weapons purchased abroad that she intended to bring to the King, who was then in Oxford. In advance of this, the King sent his nephew, Prince Rupert of the Rhine, from Oxford with 1,200 horse, 700 foot and six cannon to clear South Staffordshire. Prince Rupert's troops evicted garrisons from Rushall and Birmingham and successfully recaptured Lichfield. Rupert placed Royalist garrisons in key towns, including Burton, to secure the route of Henrietta's convoy. The garrison at Burton was soon driven out once more by Gell, acting in co-operation with Lord Grey, commander-in-chief of the East Midlands Association. He placed his own garrison there of 200 infantry, 60 dragoons and a cannon from Derbyshire, before proceeding with the remainder of his force to Tutbury Castle, which he unsuccessfully attacked.

== Battle ==
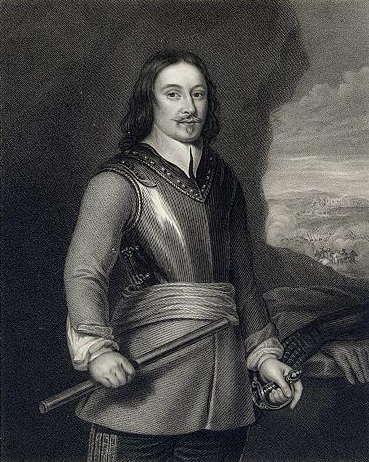
Sir Thomas Tyldesley

Gell's garrison at Burton was commanded by Captain Thomas Sanders, who had previously commanded one of the largest companies in Gell's force. Sanders held more radical political views than Gell and was seen as a potential rival. Sanders may have been concerned that his deployment to such a precarious position was a plot by Gell to be rid of him. Whatever the case, Sanders decided to remove himself from Gell's command and place himself and his men under the direction of Colonel Richard Houghton, of the Staffordshire county committee and military governor of Burton.

In July 1643, the Queen's convoy and its guard advanced from Newark to Ashby-de-la-Zouch and then to Burton. Gell summoned the Staffordshire and Nottinghamshire associations' forces to defend the town, but they refused to muster for him. On 4 July 1643, the Royalist cavalry, led by Colonel Thomas Tyldesley, charged across Burton Bridge and engaged Sanders' men. The engagement was described as "bloody" and "desperate" and, though damage was caused to the town's St Modwen's church, the battle seems to have been decided by the action at the bridge. The Parliamentarian forces were decisively beaten, and according to Gell, the town was "most miserably plundered and destroyed". Henrietta Maria herself recorded that so much loot was taken that her men "could not well march with their bundles".

The Royalists claimed that they had twice requested the surrender of the town before they attacked and that the Queen forbade any violence against the townsfolk. Conversely the Parliamentarians claimed that 30 of their men were forced into the church and offered to surrender, but were refused and were killed by Cavaliers in the night. The Royalists were also alleged to have looted the town and raped women, before drowning at least 20 civilians in the river. The Royalists took most of the Roundhead officers prisoner, including Captain Sanders and Colonel Houghton (and his wife). Sanders was later exchanged and was promoted to major by the Earl of Essex and commissioned by Gell to act as colonel and to raise a regiment of horse. Tyldesley was knighted and promoted to brigadier-general for bravery shown in the action.

== Aftermath ==
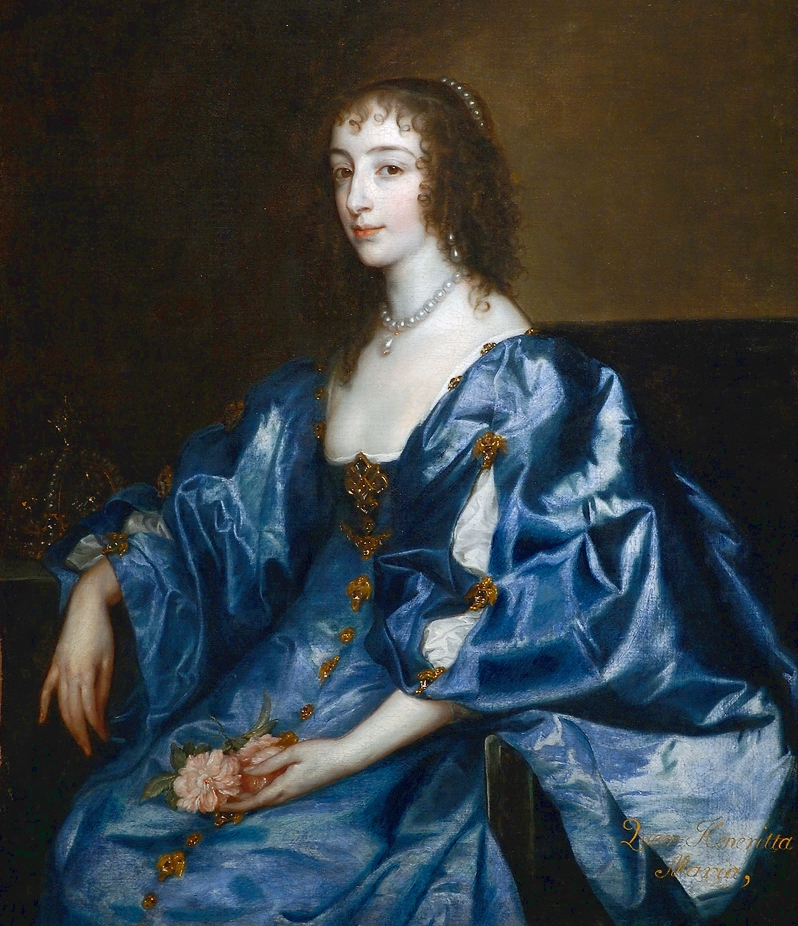
Queen Henrietta Maria

Having lost Burton, Gell feared an attack upon Derby and withdrew troops from Nottingham and Leicester to defend it. He was also able to secure supplies of 20 barrels of powder, 300 muskets, 60 carbines and 60 cases of pistols and an additional troop of horses, allowing him to arm his regiment fully for the first time. However, Derby was not attacked by the Queen's forces, who bypassed it and moved through Walsall, proceeding according to the King's instructions to avoid delays.

The new Royalist garrison in Burton fortified the bridge and maintained control of the town until driven out by Gell in January 1644. During this attack, Gell took the commanding officer (a major), six captains, eight other officers and 500 men prisoner. Burton Bridge was again a focal point of the assault, with five Royalists losing their lives there, and Gell claiming that he lost no men in the attack. Gell withdrew with his prisoners to Derby, allowing Lord Loughborough to retake the town and bridge, which he intended to hold as a means of communication between his "flying army" at Ashby and the Royalist garrisons in Tutbury and Derbyshire.

A Parliamentarian raid again attacked and plundered the town in April 1644, afterwards ceding control to the Royalists once more, before Sanders' newly raised regiment of 400 horse retook it, narrowly failing to capture Loughborough himself. Parliamentarian troops from Derbyshire and Staffordshire were established as a garrison in November 1644, but were driven out by Royalists by February 1645. King Charles I briefly made Burton his headquarters in May of that year, before the town was retaken for the final time by Parliament in early 1646, becoming a centre of supply of coin and beer to the forces besieging Tutbury and Lichfield. After the war and the Restoration of Charles II in 1660, Burton remained a place of dissent and nonconformism, with large Presbyterian and Baptist congregations, raising doubts within the Church of England over the town's loyalty.

== Legacy ==
The medieval bridge over which the battle was fought was replaced in the Victorian era. A plaque commemorating the battle was erected on the bridge on 2 July 1993 by Sir Thomas Tyldesley's Regiment of the English Civil War Society. (Note: The plaque on the modern bridge commemorating the battle reads: "near this spot on 2nd July 1643, during the English Civil War, Colonel Thomas Tyldesley led a desperate cavalry charge over the famous 36-arched Trent Bridge to storm the town of Burton, the event being personally witnessed by Queen Henrietta Maria. For this exploit of signal valour, Thomas Tyldesley was subsequently knighted by King Charles I. This plaque was erected on 2nd July 1993 by Sir Thomas Tyldesley's Regiment of the English Civil War Society and Burton upon Trent Civic Society.") Another monument erected at the site of Tyldesley's death at the Battle of Wigan Lane by one of his cornets, Alexander Rigby, in 1679 notes his "desperate storming of Burton-Upon-Trent over a bridge of 36 arches [for which Tyldesley] received the honour of Knighthood". In honour of the battle, the Burton Bridge Brewery markets an ale known as "Battle Brew". A local legend states that Oliver Cromwell was present in the area during the battle and tied his horse to a nail at Tatenhill's St Michael's and All Angels Church, just 3 miles (4.8 km) from the bridge. The medieval Burton bridge was the site of an earlier battle in 1322, in which Edward II defeated the rebellious Earl of Lancaster.
