= Morleys Hall =

Listed building in Greater Manchester, England

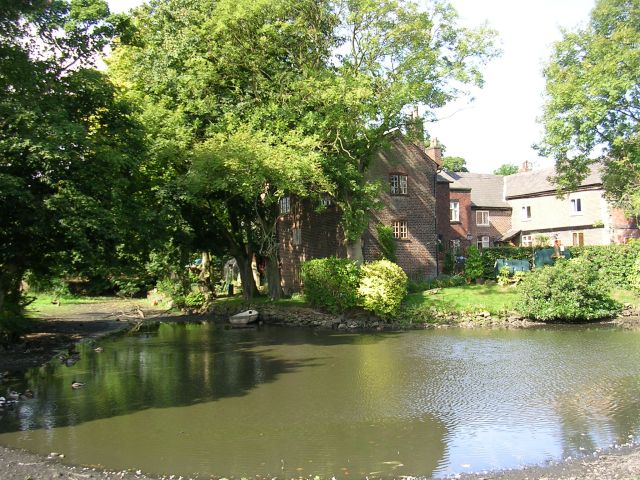
- The moat at Morleys Hall

- Location within Greater Manchester

General information
- Location: Astley, Greater Manchester, England
- Coordinates: 53.4892°N 2.4693°W
- Years built: Largely 19th century, with some 16th and 17th-century timber-framing

Design and construction
- Designations

Listed Building – Grade II*
- Official name: Morley's Hall
- Designated: 17 July 1966
- Reference no.: 1318255

Morleys Hall, a moated hall converted to two houses, is situated on Morleys Lane, on the edge of Astley Moss in Astley in the historic county of Lancashire and the ceremonial county of Greater Manchester, England. It was largely rebuilt in the 19th century on the site of a medieval timber house. The hall is a Grade II* listed building and the moat a scheduled ancient monument. Morleys is a private residence.

== History ==
The More-Leghe mentioned in documents in the early 13th century gave its name to the family who lived there until about 1381 when it passed to the Leylands. The Leylands remained at Morleys until the male line failed and passed to the Tyldesleys through Ann Leyland who married Edward, second son of Thurstan Tyldesley of Wardley Hall in 1550. Ann, daughter of Thomas Leyland, and Edward Tyldesley of Wardley Hall eloped from Morleys in 1547. Her father was not in favour of the romance as Edward was a second son with no prospects of an inheritance. Ann was locked in her room but escaped through the window with an improvised rope and joined Edward who pulled her across the moat and went to Wardley Hall and were married. The elopement became the subject of an unfinished poem by Branwell Brontë. Edward Tyldesley inherited Morleys in 1564.

After the Reformation, the family of Sir Thomas Tyldesley were recussants and allowed Ambrose Barlow, a Catholic priest who ministered to those who kept the old faith in the Leigh parish, to say mass at Morleys. He was taken prisoner at Morleys on Easter Sunday 1641 by the Vicar of Leigh and a large mob and taken to Lancaster Castle where he was martyred.

The Tyldesleys sold the hall to the Leghs of Chorley in 1755. The old hall and some land was bought by Josiah Wilkinson, who left it to his son John; the rest was purchased by Thomas Lyon. The Morleys estate was bought by Tyldesley Urban District Council in the early 20th century to build a sewage works.

== Structure ==
John Leland visited Morleys in 1540 and referred to the house as "an all timber building on stone foundations which rises six feet above the water of a great moat". The hall was extended and rebuilt at various times during the 16th and 17th centuries. The houses, in a U-shaped plan, were rebuilt in brick in the early 19th century retaining parts of the earlier timber frame. One house is built in Flemish bond brick and one in English garden wall bond.

== Moat ==
The moated site is a scheduled ancient monument which includes a slightly raised rectangular island measuring 46 metres (151 ft) by 34 m (112 ft). The waterlogged moat is between 12 and 15 m (39 and 49 ft) wide and 3 m (9.8 ft) deep, fed by a spring from an inlet at the north-eastern corner and has an outlet at the south-eastern corner where it widens into a "Cheshire Bulge", probably a watering place for cattle. The island was originally accessed by a timber drawbridge replaced in late-medieval times by a brick and sandstone bridge. It is considered that archaeological evidence of earlier buildings will exist beneath the present house built in 1804 on the island.

== See also ==
- Grade II* listed buildings in Greater Manchester
- Listed buildings in Astley, Greater Manchester
