= St Stephen's Church, Astley =

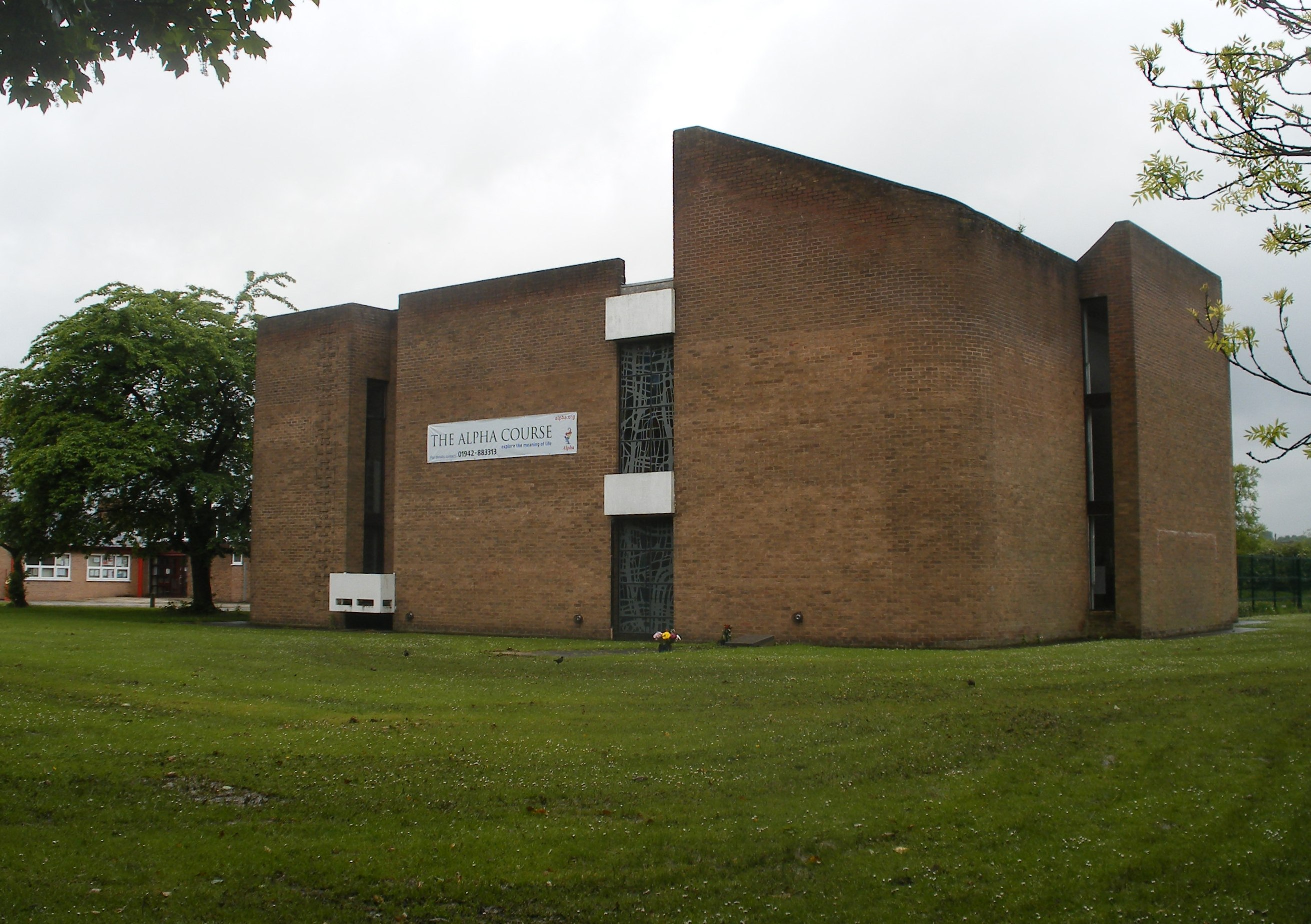
- The third St Stephen's Church
- St Stephen's Church, Astley
- 53.501°N 2.456°W
- OS grid reference: SD 69849 00573
- Location: Astley, Greater Manchester.
- Country: England
- Denomination: Anglican
- Website: St Stephen - Astley

History
- Founded: 1631
- Consecrated: 1968

Architecture
- Functional status: Active

Specifications
- Materials: Brick

St Stephen's Church is a parish church located in Astley, Greater Manchester, England. It is an active Anglican church built in 1968, and it is part of the Leigh deanery in the archdeaconry of Salford diocese of Manchester. Along with St George's Church, Tyldesley, and St John's Church, Mosley Common St Stephen's forms part of the united benefice of Astley, Tyldesley and Mosley Common.

The origins of St Stephen's Church date back to Astley Chapel, a chapel of ease of Leigh Parish Church built in 1631 and its successor which was burned in an arson attack in 1961.

== History ==
The first chapel, built and paid for by Adam Mort, a wealthy owner of Damhouse, who died in early 1631. The chapel was consecrated on August 3 of that same year by the Bishop of Chester. It was the first chapel of ease of the mother church of Leigh, and dedicated to St Stephen, the first Christian martyr. The chapel was built of local brick on part of the common. Reverend Thomas Crompton, appointed by Thomas Mort, became the first minister in 1632.

The original chapel, constructed from local brick on part of the common, served the community for nearly 130 years until it was rebuilt after becoming dilapidated. In 1760, the first chapel was replaced by a slightly larger structure built on the same site. Thomas Froggatt of Damhouse contributed to the cost of the new construction. This second chapel, made from handmade brick, measured 54 ft 6 in (16.61 m) in length and 36 ft (11 m) in width. It could hold 170 people and had a nave with four side and two end windows, and a small chancel and had an embattled western tower containing a single bell. The chapel was enlarged in 1834, 1842, and 1847.

The second chapel was destroyed by an arson attack on June 18, 1961. Rather than reconstructing on the same site, it was decided to relocate the church to a new site on Manchester Road. The third iteration of St Stephen's Church was consecrated on October 26, 1968.

== Clergy ==
The first minister was the son of William Crompton of Bedford and his successor was from Shakerley. They were both educated at Brasenose College, Oxford.

1632 Thomas Crompton, B.A. (ejected for nonconformity).
1683 John Battersby
1702 Roger Seddon, died 1716
1716 James Marsh, died 1728
1732 Thomas Mawdesley, died 1769
1769 Robert Barker
1822 Thomas Birkett
1838 John Wilkinson Edwards, B.A. died 1840
1840 Alfred Hewlett, D.D. died 1885
1885 James Alexander Maxwell Johnstone, M.A
1970s Jack Finney 1980s John Findon 2010 Jonathan Carmyllie (Team rector of the united benefice of Astley, Tyldesley and Mosley Common)

== See also ==
- List of churches in Greater Manchester
