= Ambrose Barlow =

English Roman Catholic saint

Saint Ambrose Edward Barlow O.S.B
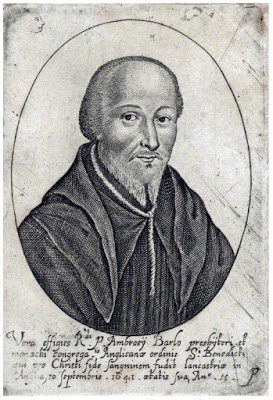

Monk and martyr
- Born: c. 1585; Barlow Hall, Chorlton-cum-Hardy, Manchester, Lancashire, England
- Died: 10 September 1641 (aged 55-56); Lancaster, Lancashire, England
- Venerated in: Catholic Church
- Beatified: 15 December 1929, St Peter's Basilica, Vatican City by Pius XI
- Canonized: 25 October 1970, St Peter's Basilica, Vatican City by Paul VI
- Feast: 10 September (individual); 7 August (one of the Lancaster Martyrs); 25 October (together with Forty Martyrs of England and Wales); 29 October (one of the Douai Martyrs)
- Attributes: Martyr's palm, bible, crucifix, noose around neck, rosary
- Patronage: Manchester, people with stroke

Ambrose Edward Barlow, O.S.B. (1585 – 10 September 1641) was an English Benedictine monk. He is one of a group of saints canonized by Pope Paul VI who became known as the Forty Martyrs of England and Wales.

== Early life and education ==
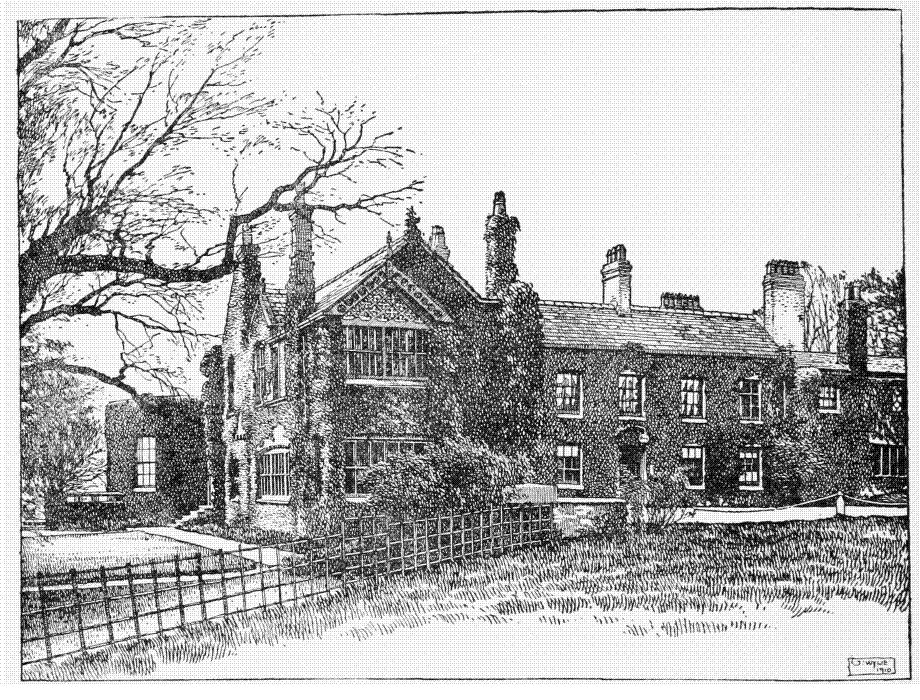
Barlow Hall, 1910

Ambrose was born at Barlow Hall, Chorlton-cum-Hardy, near Manchester in 1585. He was the fourth son of the nobleman Sir Alexander Barlow (who was knighted on the accession of James I) and his wife Mary Brereton, who was daughter of Sir Urian Brereton of Handforth Hall and his second wife, Alice Trafford On the maternal side of his family, he was part of the wider Brereton family, who generally leaned towards the reformed faith. The paternal side of his family, the Barlows, had been reluctant converts to the Church of England following the suppression of the Catholic Church in England and Wales. Ambrose's paternal grandfather died in 1584 whilst imprisoned for his beliefs, and his father had two-thirds of his estate confiscated for refusing to conform to the rules of the newly established religion. On 30 November 1585, Ambrose was baptised at Didsbury Chapel. His baptism entry reads "Edwarde, legal sonne of Alex' Barlowe, gent' 30".

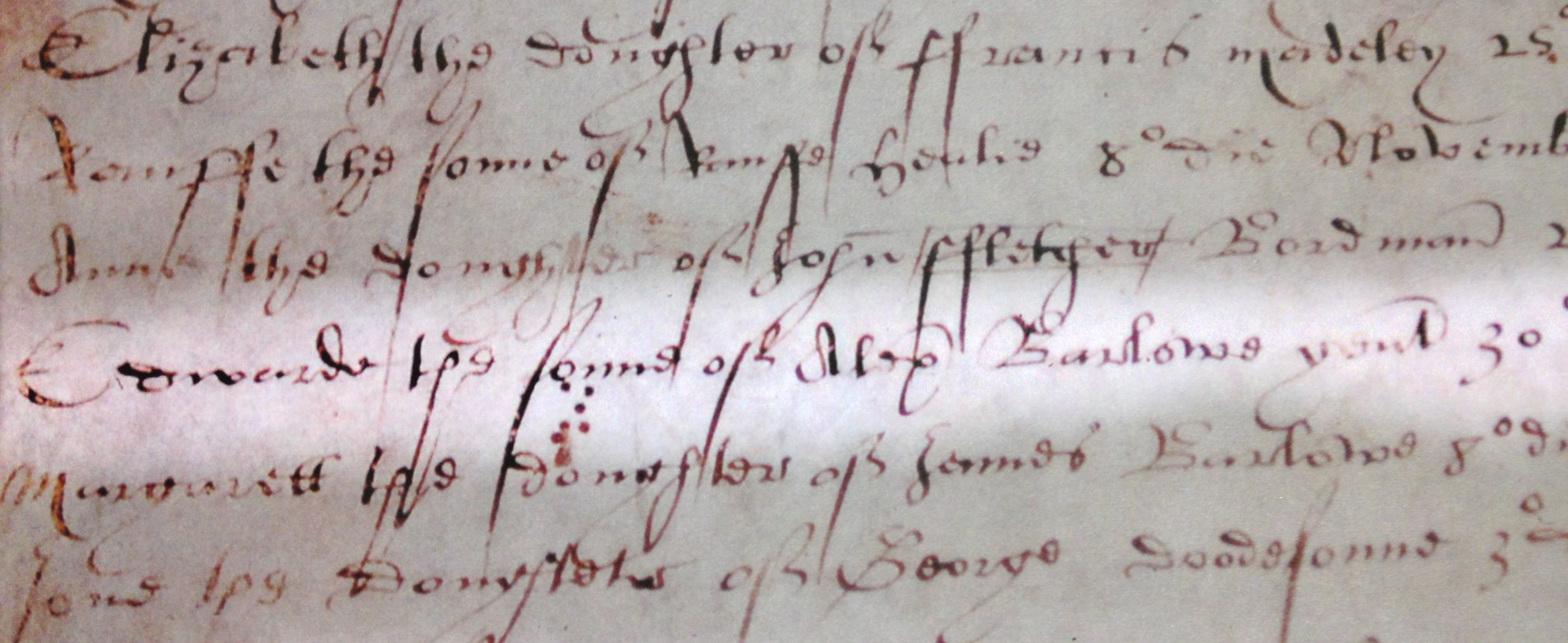
Baptism Record of Ambrose Barlow

In 1597, at the age of twelve, Edward entered the household of a Protestant cousin, Sir Urian Leigh of Adlington, Cheshire, to serve an apprenticeship as a page. His cousin was the son of his maternal aunt, Sibila (Brereton) Leigh, the half-sister of Barlow's mother, Mary (Brereton) Barlow. Barlow adhered to the Anglican faith until 1607, when he converted to Roman Catholicism after a friend brought him back to Catholicism.

After completing his apprenticeship, Barlow realised that his true vocation was for the priesthood, so travelled to Douai in France to study at the English College there before attending the Royal College of Saint Alban in Valladolid, Spain. In 1613, on a visit to England, Barlow was imprisoned for his beliefs for several months; however, after being released, he returned to Douai in 1615, where he joined the community of English Benedictine monks at St. Gregory's (now Downside Abbey), where his brother Rudesind Barlow was prior. He became a member of the Order of Saint Benedict, taking the name Ambrose in place of his baptismal name of Edward. He was ordained as a priest in 1617.

== Mission ==
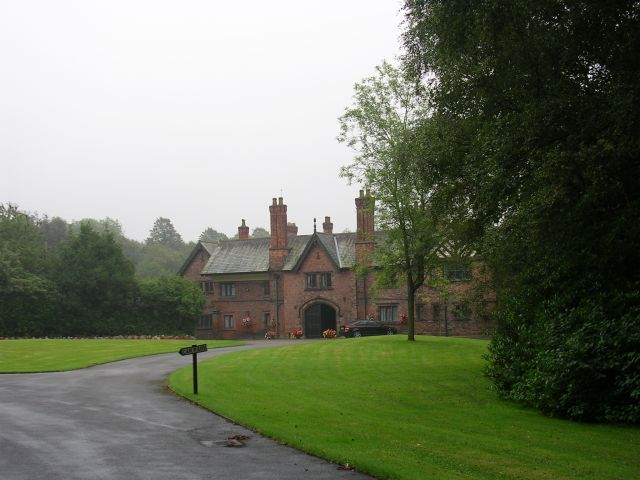
Wardley Hall

After his ordination into the priesthood in 1617, Ambrose returned to England. Merely entering the country as a Catholic priest was treasonable and hazardous. Ports were dangerous, and officials had descriptions from spies of those attempting to return to these shores. He went to Barlow Hall, before taking up residence at the home of Sir Thomas Tyldesley at Morleys Hall, Astley. For twenty-four years, he laboured in south Lancashire, which, fortunately for Barlow, was not overly hostile territory for Catholics or their priests. Sir Thomas' grandmother had arranged for a pension to be made available to the priest, which would enable him to carry out his priestly duties amongst the poor Catholics within his parish.

From there, he secretly catered to the needs of Catholic 'parishioners', offering daily Mass and reciting his Office and Rosary for over two decades. Resembling Thomas More in his wit and mildness, Barlow was greatly loved by the poor, whom he also entertained at his house on the great feasts. To avoid detection by the Protestant authorities, he devised a four-week routine: he travelled throughout the parish for four weeks, then remained within the Hall for five weeks. He would often visit his cousins, the Downes, at their residence of Wardley Hall and conduct Mass for the gathered congregation.

== Arrest and execution ==
Ambrose was arrested four times during his travels and released without charge. King Charles I signed a proclamation on 7 March 1641, which decreed that all priests should leave the country within one calendar month or face being arrested and treated as traitors, resulting in imprisonment or death. Ambrose's parishioners implored him to flee, or at least to go into hiding, but he refused. Their fears were compounded by a recent stroke which had resulted in the 56-year-old priest being partially paralysed. "Let them fear that have anything to lose which they are unwilling to part with", he told them.

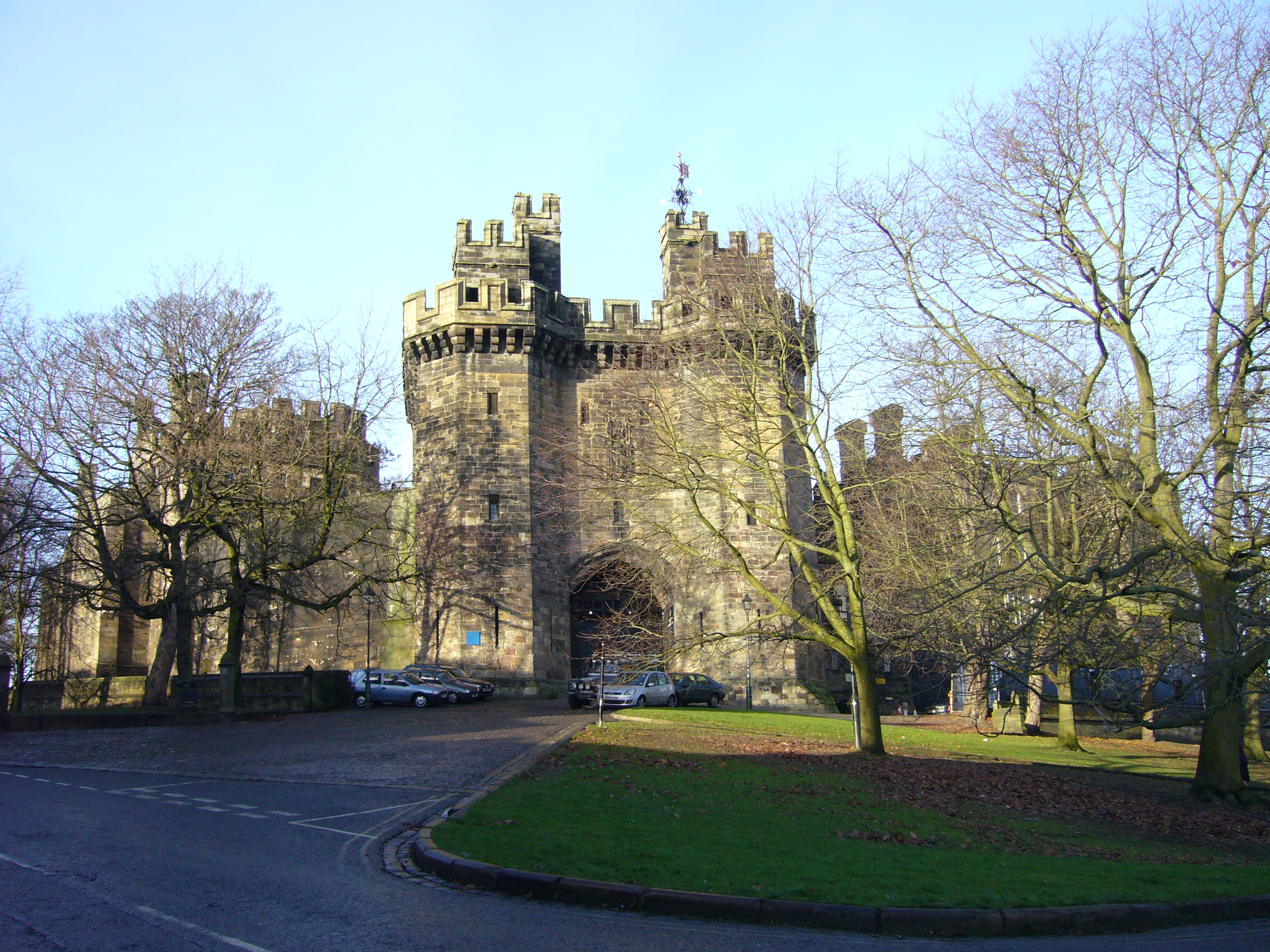
Lancaster Castle

On 25 April 1641, Easter Day, Ambrose and his congregation of around 150 people were surrounded at Morleys Hall, Astley by the Vicar of Leigh and his armed congregation of some 400. Father Ambrose surrendered, and his parishioners were released after their names had been recorded.

The priest was restrained, then taken on a horse with a man behind him to prevent his falling, and escorted by a band of sixty people to the Justice of the Peace at Winwick, before being transported to Lancaster Castle. It was at this time he had a premonition of what his fate would be since it is reported that Edmund Arrowsmith appeared to him in a dream and said that he too would become a martyr.

Father Ambrose appeared before the presiding judge, Sir Robert Heath, on 7 September when he professed his adherence to the Catholic faith and defended his actions. On 8 September, the feast of the Nativity of Mary, Sir Robert Heath found Ambrose guilty and sentenced him to be executed. Two days later, he was taken from Lancaster Castle, drawn on a hurdle to the place of execution, hanged, dismembered, quartered, and boiled in oil. His head was afterwards exposed on a pike. His cousin, Francis Downes, Lord of Wardley Hall, a devout Catholic, rescued his skull and preserved it at Wardley, where it remains to this day.

When the news of his death and martyrdom reached his Benedictine brothers at Douai Abbey, a Mass of Thanksgiving and the Te Deum were ordered to be sung.

== Canonisation ==
On 15 December 1929, Pope Pius XI proclaimed Father Ambrose as Blessed at his Beatification ceremony at St. Peter's Basilica, Vatican City. In recognition of the large number of British Catholic martyrs who were executed during the Reformation, most during the reign of Elizabeth I, Pope Paul VI decreed that on 25 October 1970 he was canonising many people who were to be known as the Forty Martyrs of England and Wales of whom Ambrose was one.

== Hagiography and relics ==
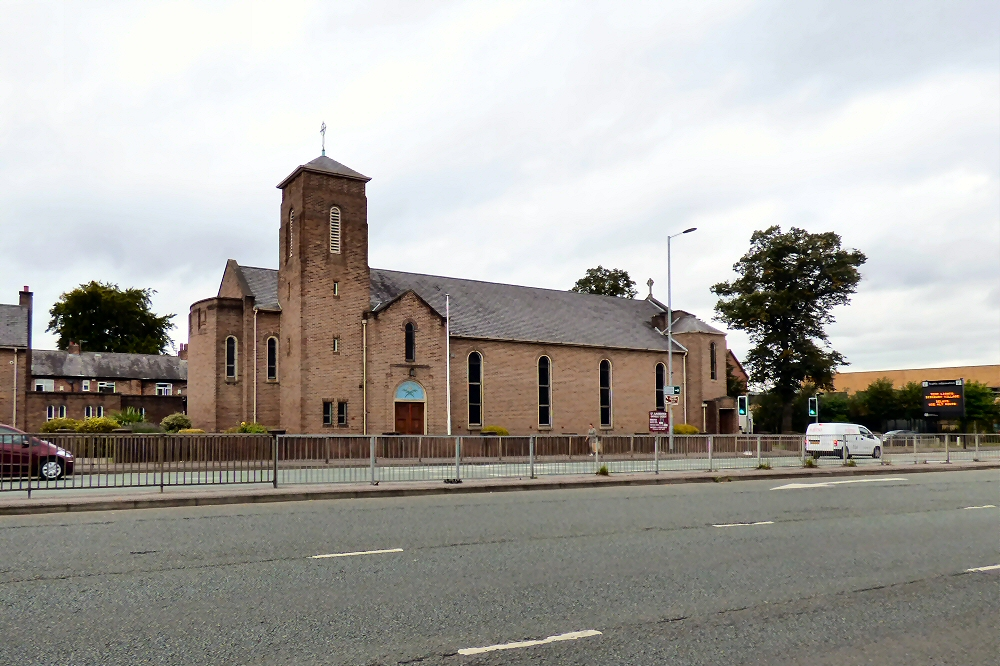
Church of St Ambrose of Milan, Chorlton-cum-Hardy

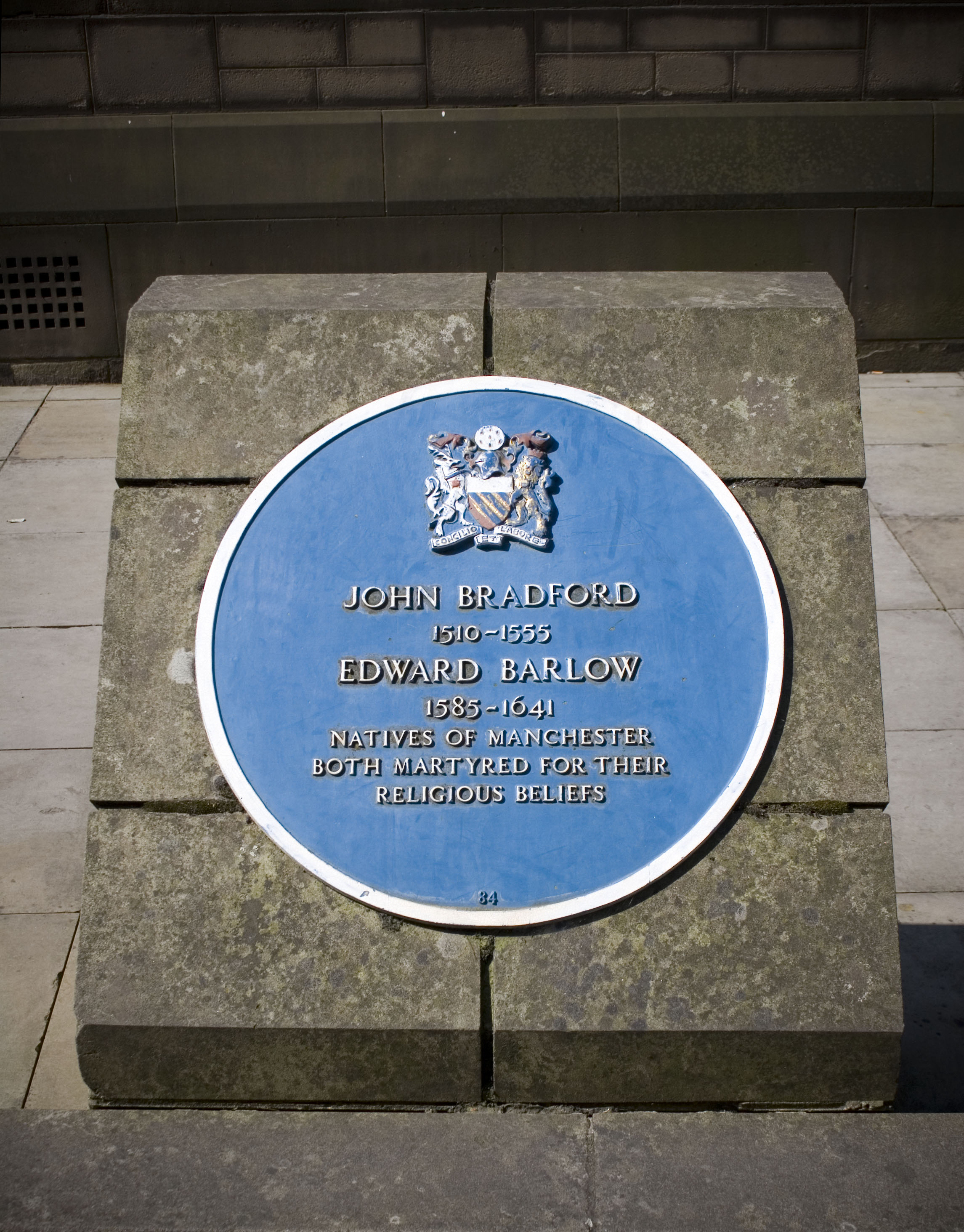
The blue plaque outside Manchester Cathedral

Challoner (see below) compiled Barlow's biography from two manuscripts belonging to St Gregory's Monastery, one of which was written by his brother Rudesind Barlow, president of the English Benedictine Congregation. A third manuscript, titled "The Apostolical Life of Ambrose Barlow", was written by one of his pupils for Rudesind Barlow and is in the John Rylands Library, Manchester; the Chetham Society has printed it.

Two portraits of Barlow and one of his father, Sir Alexander, are known to exist.

Several relics of Ambrose are also preserved:

- his jaw bone is held at the Church of St Ambrose, Barlow Moor, Manchester
- his left hand is preserved at Stanbrook Abbey now at Wass, North Yorkshire
- his right hand is at Mount Angel Abbey in St. Benedict, Oregon
- his skull is preserved and kept at Wardley Hall in Worsley, the one-time home of the Downes family, and now the home of the Catholic bishop of Salford.

== Legacy ==
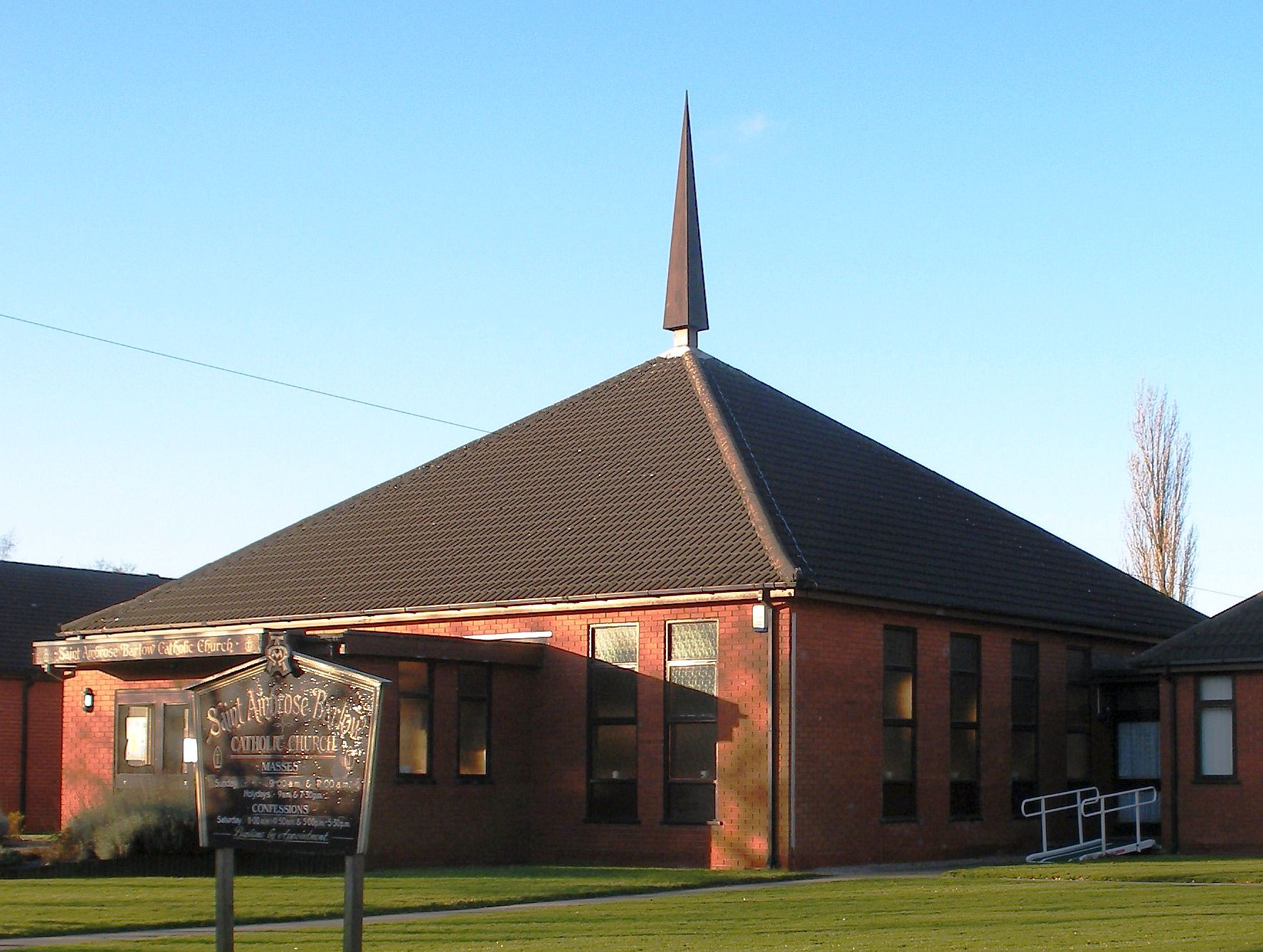
St Ambrose Barlow Church in Astley

The church of St Ambrose at Barlow Moor, Chorlton, Manchester, is in the parish of his birthplace. It was founded in 1932 and was initially dedicated to Ambrose of Milan, but was renamed Ambrose Barlow at his canonisation. It has one relic of Barlow There is another church dedicated to him in the Greater Manchester area, St Ambrose Barlow Roman Catholic church in Astley. Another church, Saint Ambrose Barlow Roman Catholic Church, is dedicated to him in Hall Green, Birmingham.

Schools named after Barlow include St Ambrose RC Primary School, Chorlton-cum-Hardy, The Barlow Roman Catholic High School in Didsbury, St Ambrose Barlow Roman Catholic High School in Swinton near Manchester, St Ambrose Barlow Catholic High School in Netherton, Merseyside, and St Ambrose Barlow Catholic Primary School in Hall Green, Birmingham. One of the boarding houses at Downside School is named Barlow in his honour.

An Oblate Chapter (association of secular Benedictines) of Douai Abbey, meeting at St Anne's Roman Catholic Church in Ormskirk, has Ambrose Barlow as its patron.
