= Ralph Weldon (Benedictine) =

English Benedictine monk and chronicler

- Born: 12 April 1674; London
- Died: 23 November 1713 (aged 39)
- Occupations: Benedictine monk and chronicler

Ralph Weldon (12 April 1674 – 23 November 1713) was an English Benedictine monk and chronicler.

== Biography ==
Weldon was from the ancient family of Weldon of Swanscombe, Kent. He was the seventeenth child of Colonel George Weldon (youngest son of Sir Anthony Weldon) and of his wife, Lucy Necton. He was born in London on 12 April (N.S.) 1674, and was christened at the Savoy. Being converted to the catholic religion by Father Joseph Johnstone, he made his abjuration at St. James's Chapel on 12 October 1687. He made his profession as a Benedictine monk in the convent of St. Edmund at Paris on 13 January 1691–2. Although a very learned man, he could never be induced to take priest's orders. He died at St. Edmund's on 23 November 1713.

He was the author of ‘A Chronicle of the English Benedictine Monks from the renewing of their Congregation in the days of Queen Mary to the death of King James II’ [London, 1882], 4to. The original manuscript, consisting of two folio volumes of ‘Chronological Notes,’ is preserved at Ampleforth, and there is an abridgment of it at St. Gregory's, Downside.
