= 1909 in rail transport =

This article lists events related to rail transport that occurred in 1909.

== Events ==
=== January events ===
- January 1 - The Chemins de fer de l'Ouest in France is incorporated into the state-owned Chemins de fer de l'État.
- January 26 - The Jamestown, Franklin and Clearfield Railroad, a predecessor of the Lake Shore & Michigan Southern Railway, is formed from the merger of four smaller railroads in Pennsylvania.
- January 29 - The final spike is driven in the construction of the Virginian Railway at Glen Lyn, Virginia.

=== March events ===
- March 7 - The Winona Interurban Railway (Indiana) is forced by its major creditor to begin operations on Sundays, a move resisted by its Sabbatarian founders, including H.J. Heinz and J. M. Studebaker.

=== April events ===
- April 1 - Great Central Railway places turbine steamships on its Grimsby-Rotterdam service.
- April 4 - Passenger service begins on the Chicago, Lake Shore and South Bend Railroad (predecessor of the Chicago South Shore and South Bend Railroad) between Hammond, Indiana, and Pullman, Illinois.
- April 12 - Gary, Indiana, United States: a westbound Chicago, Lake Shore and South Bend Railroad train runs past a meet point and causes a head-on collision with an eastbound train, killing twelve.

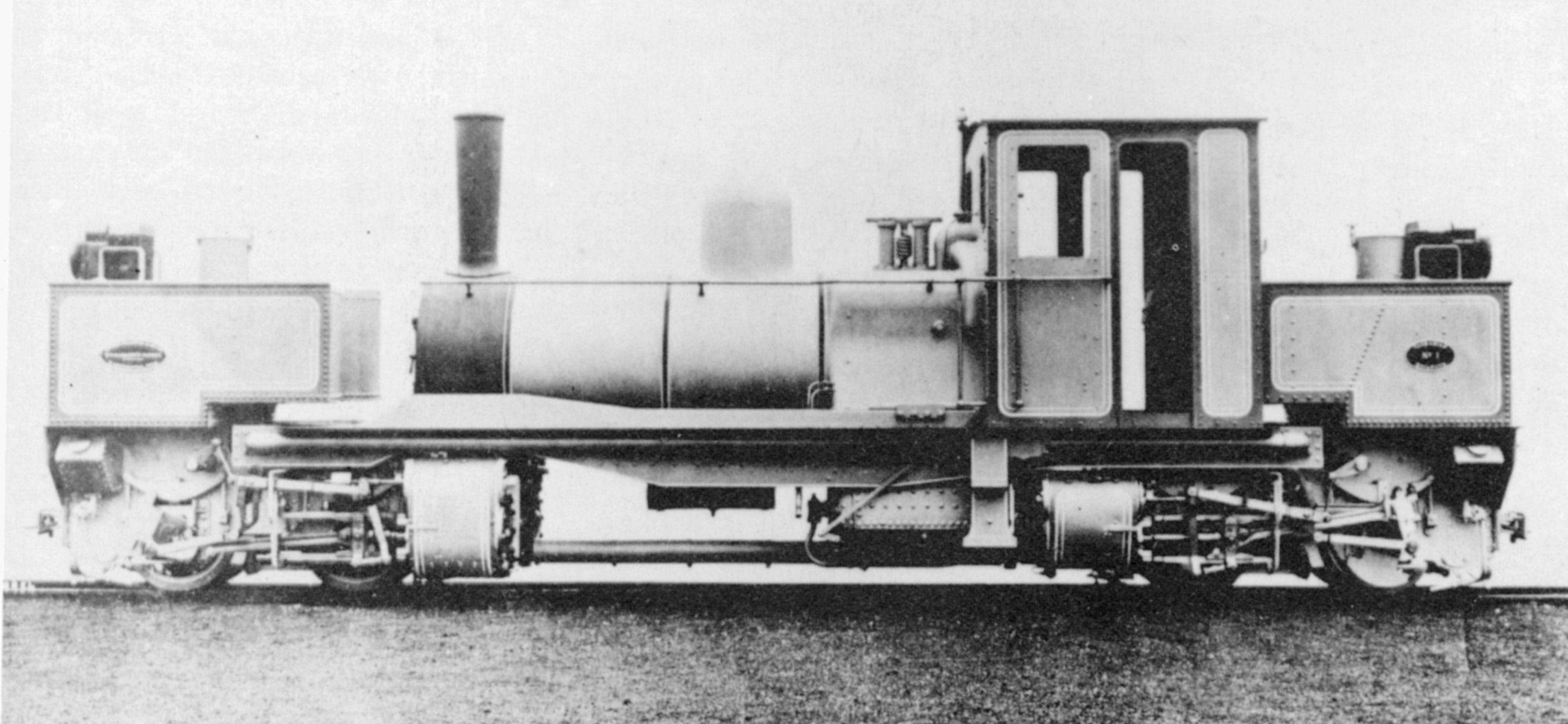
K1, the first Garratt locomotive, photographed by its builders, Beyer, Peacock & Company

=== May events ===
- May 17 - Firemen on the Georgia Railroad strike to protest the hiring of African-Americans.
- May 26 – Los Angeles Pacific Railroad begins passenger service over the Santa Monica Air Line.

=== June events ===
- June - George Whale retires as Chief Mechanical Engineer of the London & North Western Railway; he is succeeded by Charles Bowen-Cooke.
- June 19 - Shadyside, Indiana, United States: an eastbound Chicago South Shore & South Bend Railroad train runs past a meet point and causes a head-on collision with a westbound train.

=== July events ===
- July 10 - The Great Northern Railway electrifies the 2.5-mile (4.0 km) original Cascade Tunnel, near the summit of Stevens Pass in the Cascade Mountains. This first system and General Electric-built boxcabs are the only three-phase AC railway electrification implementation ever to be used in North America.
- July 25 - Opening of Tauern Railway Line in Austria.

=== August events ===
- August 30 - Great Western Railway begins using its Fishguard terminus in Wales for boat trains in connection with the Cunard steamships on Atlantic routes as a first port of call.
- August - Canadian Pacific opens the Spiral Tunnels to traffic on the line through Kicking Horse Pass.

=== September events ===
- September - Robert S. Lovett succeeds E. H. Harriman as president of the Southern Pacific Company, parent company of the Southern Pacific. Lovett also assumes the position of Chairman of the Executive Committee for the railroad.
- September 17 - Beyer, Peacock & Company of Manchester, England, steam the first Garratt locomotive built to the design of Herbert William Garratt, K1 for the North East Dundas Tramway.

=== October events ===
- October 9 - The Alaska Northern Railroad Company (a predecessor of the Alaska Railroad) purchases the assets of the bankrupt Alaska Central Railway and subsequently extends the line northward another 34 km (21 mi).
- October - Blue Nile Road & Railway Bridge completed at Khartoum in Sudan, the longest bridge in tropical Africa at this date.

=== November events ===
- November 1 - A Golden Spike ceremony is held on the Western Pacific Railroad. As no company officials are present, the local track foreman drives the last spike, the track crew shout “Hooray!” and two women walking by with their children kiss each other.
- November 3 - The Lethbridge Viaduct, one of the largest railway structures in Canada on the Canadian Pacific near Lethbridge, Alberta, opens.
- November 10 - Louis Brennan successfully demonstrates his gyroscopically-balanced monorail system, which he designed for military use and patented in 1903, at Gillingham, England.
- November 21 - Kagoshima Line, Mojiko (Kitakyushu), via Hakata (Fukuoka), Kumamoto, Hitoyoshi to Kagoshima route officially completed in Kyushu Island, Japan.

=== December events ===
- December 1 - The London, Brighton & South Coast Railway publicly inaugurates London's first suburban surface railway electrification on its South London line, known as the "Elevated Electric" (overhead wire 6.7 kV a.c. at 25 Hz).
- December 20 - Henry Fowler is appointed Chief Mechanical Engineer of the Midland Railway of England, succeeding Richard Deeley.

=== Unknown date events ===
- The Nickel Plate Road begins a massive grade separation project in Cleveland, Ohio, to eliminate street grade crossings on the railroad's mainline in the city.
- Albert Hunt invents the wigwag grade crossing protection signal for the Pacific Electric in Los Angeles, California.
- Opening of the Jingzhang railway connecting Beijing with Zhangjiakou, first section of the Jingbao railway in northwestern China and the first railway designed and built by Chinese.
- Reconstruction of Flinders Street railway station in Melbourne, Australia, is completed.

== Births ==
=== August births ===
- August 4 – Isabel Benham, American railroad financial expert, is born (d. 2013).

== Deaths ==
=== February deaths ===
- February 4 – Thomas Lowry, president of Minneapolis Street Railway 1877-1892, president of Twin City Rapid Transit, president of Soo Line Railroad 1889-1890 and 1892-1909, dies (b. 1843).

=== March deaths ===
- March 13 - William Jackson Palmer, builder of the Denver & Rio Grande Western Railroad (born 1836).

=== May deaths ===
- May 19 - Henry H. Rogers, American financier who helped finance and build the Virginian Railway (born 1840).

=== July deaths ===
- July 23 - Ernest F. Cambier, Belgian colonial pioneer who established the first Congo railway (born 1844).

=== September deaths ===
- September 9 - E. H. Harriman, executive in charge of both the Union Pacific and the Southern Pacific (born 1848).

=== October deaths ===
- March 24 - Edward Entwistle, first driver of the Rocket locomotive (born 1815).
