= Garrett Hall =

Listed building in Greater Manchester, England

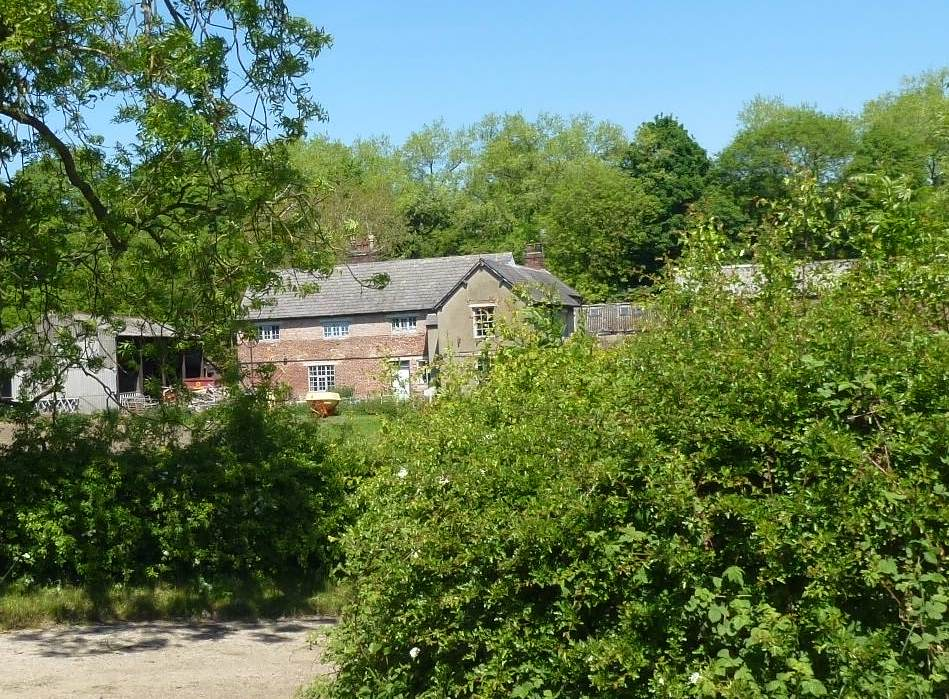
- Garrett Hall farmhouse
- Interactive map of the Garrett Hall area

General information
- Location: Tyldesley, Greater Manchester, England
- Coordinates: 53.510°N 2.442°W

Design and construction
- Designations

Listed Building – Grade II
- Official name: Garrett Hall
- Designated: 27 July 1987
- Reference no.: 1163348

Garrett Hall or The Garrett is a former manor house that became a farmhouse in Tyldesley, Greater Manchester, England. The hall was designated a grade II listed building in 1987.

== History ==
The Garrett was the home and estate of the lords of the manor of Tyldesley after the manor was split from Astley. John Tyldesley lived there in 1468 and his son, John, was living there in 1505 when he swore fealty to the Butlers at Bewsey for his land at Garratt. When John Tyldesley of Garrett died in 1558 his estate comprised seven messuages, 100 acres of heath and the same of moss, 20 acres of pasture, 10 of meadow, six of woodland and 40 acres of other land.

In 1613 the will of Lambert Tyldesley revealed that the former manor house contained "a kitchen, backhouse, dayhouse, mealhouse, larder, buttery, parlour and hall. In addition there was a storehouse, closet, three chambers over the kitchen, parlour and hall, a small chamber, a servant's chamber and a maid's room." The Tyldesley family held the manor until Lambert Tyldesley's death in 1652 when it passed through his great-granddaughter Mary, to her husband Thomas Stanley. In 1702 Thomas Withington was the tenant and it had a hall, parlour, little parlour, kitchen, buttery and chamber above. There were two looms in the kitchen and Withington kept five horses and a colt, cattle, sheep and two pigs. In 1716 the hall, its water mill for grinding corn and kiln were let.

The estate remained with the Stanleys until it was sold to Thomas Clowes of Manchester in 1732. The Reverend Thomas Clowes sold the hall and estate to Robert Haldane Bradshaw of Worsley Old Hall for £21,000 (equivalent to £1,990,000 in 2025) in 1829 and it became part of the Bridgewater estates who were buying neighbouring estates for their mineral rights. The present landowners, Peel Holdings, have proposed building 600 houses on farmland between the cemetery and Mosley Common.

== Architecture ==
The 17th-century hall is now a farmhouse. The two-storey, timber-framed structure was built on a T-shaped plan. It was altered in the 18th and 19th centuries when it was largely rebuilt in brick. It has a slate roof and its walls were rendered in the 20th century. The hall is reputed to have two priest holes.

== See also ==
- Listed buildings in Tyldesley
