= Tyldesley Little Theatre =

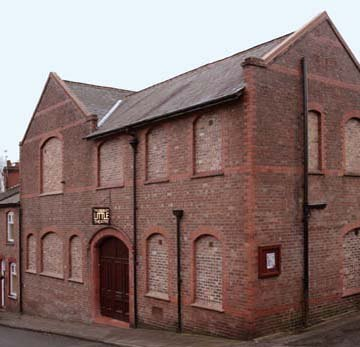

General information
- Type: Theatre
- Location: Tyldesley, England
- Coordinates: 53.5138°N 2.4703°W
- Completed: 1905

Website
- http://www.tlt.org.uk

Tyldesley Little Theatre is a small theatre in Lemon Street, Tyldesley, Greater Manchester, England. It is the home of a local amateur dramatic society, which mounted its first production at the theatre in 1921. The theatre has been described as 'one of the few remaining authentic back street theatres'.

The theatre building started life as "Church House" built by subscription in 1905 and managed by a committee from St George's Church. It originally had gymnasium facilities and was used by the local community, including, from 1921, the amateur dramatic society. By 1959 the building had fallen into disrepair, and the committee committed it to the amateur dramatic society for its sole use.

The theatre's stage has a proscenium arch and a combined seating capacity of 139, in ground-floor stalls and balcony. The company produces a variety of plays and an annual traditional family pantomime. The society is a member of the Greater Manchester Drama Federation (GMDF), the Bolton Amateur Theatre Society (BATS), and is a registered charity run by volunteers.

In 1957 the theatre produced the premiere of the comedy The Sky's the Limit written by Leigh playwright, Arthur Helsby. The production was mounted in September 2007, to celebrate the play's 50th anniversary Arnold Helsby's daughter, Wendy, on a visit from the USA, attended the production.

Tyldesley Little Theatre has twice received assistance from waste company Viridor which distributes grants from landfill tax credits. In 2009, a Viridor grant paid for roof repairs and upgrades to technical equipment, and in 2010 grant aid worth £42,000 was used to create a basement refreshment/rehearsal area, improve the heating system and create storage space. In 2010 Tyldesley Little Theatre won three awards out of seven nominations at the Greater Manchester Drama Federation (GMDF) awards ceremony, and in July 2011 won five awards out of nine nominations at the GMDF award ceremony.
