= Tyldesley Urban District =

Former local government area in the UK

Coordinates: 53.5166°N 2.4668°W

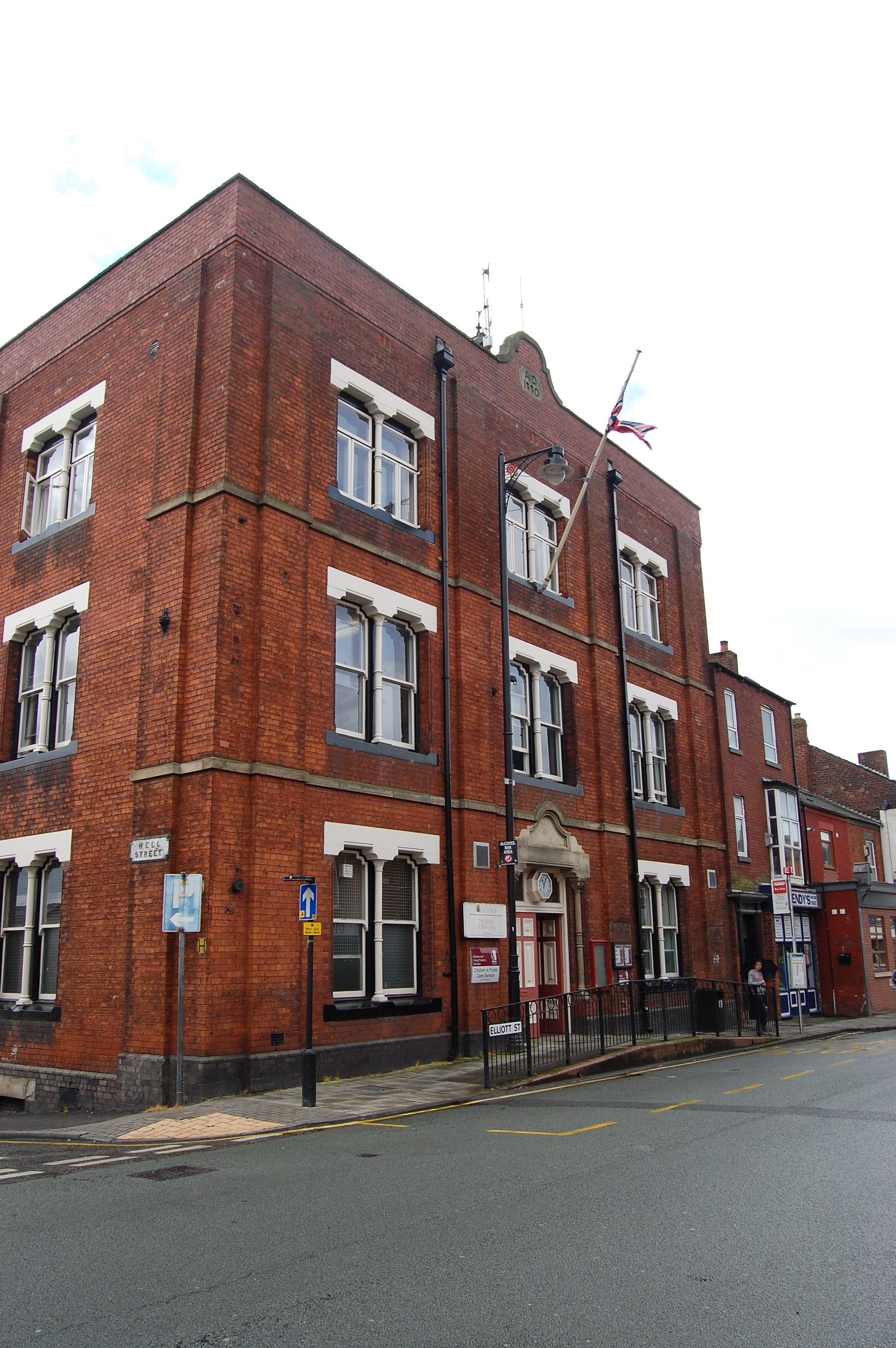
- Tyldesley Town Hall
- Area
  - 1894: 2,690 acres (10.9 km^{2})
  - 1974: 5,375 acres (21.75 km^{2})
- Population
  - 1911: 15,582
  - 1961: 16,813
- History
  - Created: 1894
  - Abolished: 1974
  - Succeeded by: Metropolitan Borough of Wigan
- Status: Urban district
  - HQ: Tyldesley Town Hall

Tyldesley cum Shakerley Urban District and its successor Tyldesley Urban District was, from 1894 to 1974, a local government district in Lancashire, England.

== History ==
The township of Tyldesley cum Shakerley historically lay in the large ecclesiastical parish of Leigh and was a member of the Leigh Poor Law Union which was formed in 1837.

In 1863 Tyldesley cum Shakerley Local Government District was created when the township adopted the Local Government Act 1858. A local board was formed to govern the town. The Local Government Act 1894 reconstituted the area as an urban district, and Tyldesley cum Shakerley Urban District Council replaced the local board. The urban district council consisted of fifteen members, representing five wards—North, East, South, West, and Shakerley. The only change to boundaries was in 1933, when the Lancashire (Manchester and District) Review Order added Astley civil parish from the neighbouring Leigh Rural District and the urban district was renamed Tyldesley Urban District. In 1974 Tyldesley Urban District was abolished by the Local Government Act 1972 and its former area transferred to Greater Manchester to form part of the Metropolitan Borough of Wigan.

Tyldesley's town hall was originally in Lower Elliot Street, opposite the council's depot and fire station. In 1924 the township's Liberal Club which opened in 1881 was bought by the council as its town hall. Tyldesley UDC was responsible for the opening of Tyldesley Park on Astley Street in 1902, the provision of the Carnegie Library in 1909, and council housing estates at Sale Lane, Mosley Common and Shakerley.

- Lunn, John (1953), A Short History of the Township of Tyldesley, Tyldesley Urban District Council
