= St John's Church, Mosley Common =

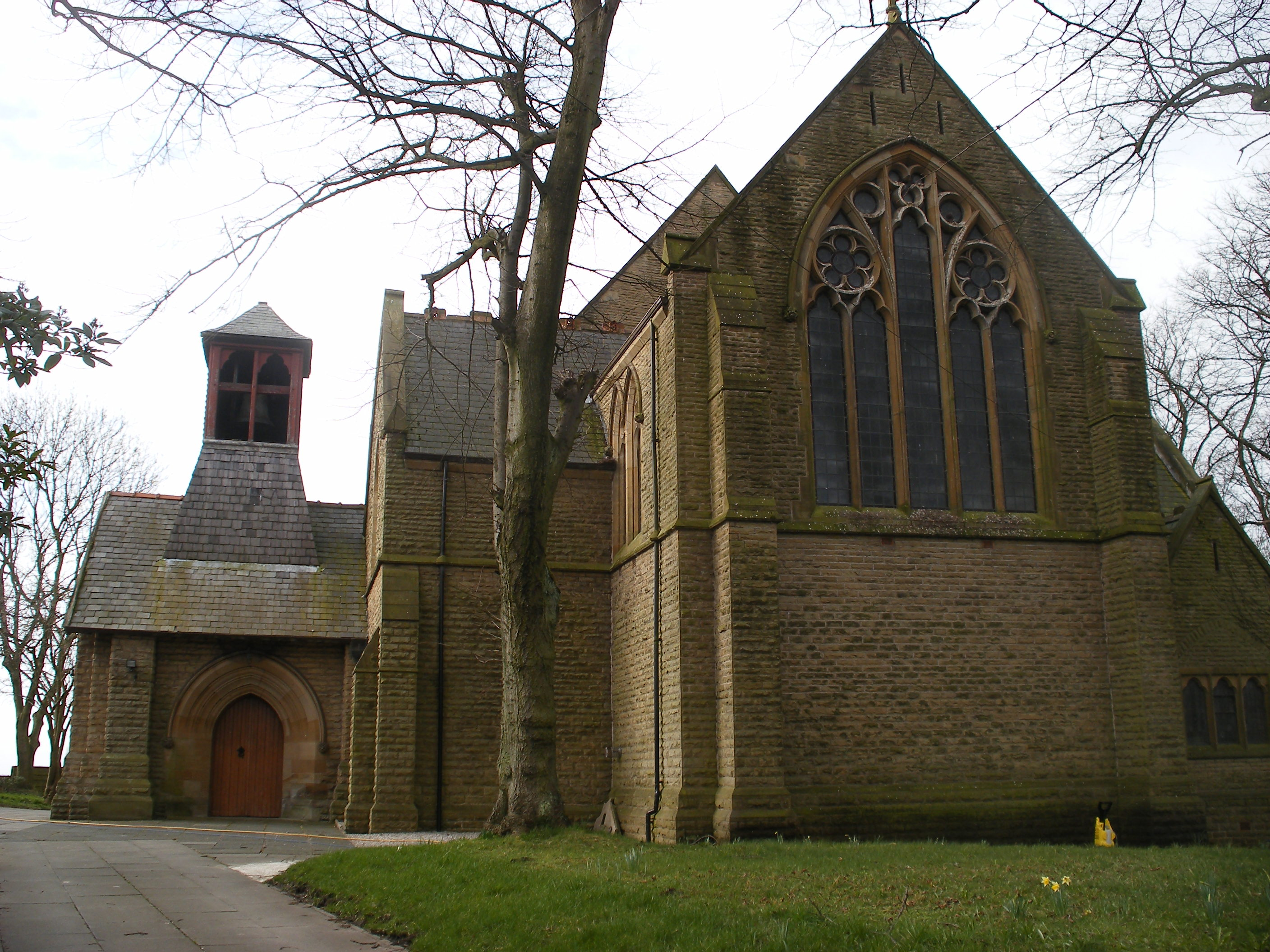
- St John's Church, Mosley Common
- 53.5091°N 2.4330°W
- OS grid reference: SD 71373 01469
- Location: Mosley Common, Greater Manchester.
- Country: England
- Denomination: Anglican
- Website: St John's Church, Mosley Common

History
- Founded: 1886
- Consecrated: 1895

Architecture
- Functional status: Active
- Construction cost: £4,250

Specifications
- Materials: Yorkshire freestone

St John's Church is an Anglican church on Mosley Common Road, Mosley Common, Greater Manchester, England. It is an active church built in 1886 and part of Leigh deanery in the archdeaconry of Salford, diocese of Manchester. Together with St George and St Stephen, is part of the united benefice of Astley, Tyldesley and Mosley Common.

== History ==
Worship in Mosley Common took place in the school which operated as a mission of Ellenbrook Chapel from the early 1800s. In 1885, subscribers contributed £4,250 (equivalent to £470,000 in 2025), to build the church on a site donated by the Bridgewater Trustees. The subscribers included the Earl of Ellesmere, Lord Lilford, Mrs Harrison of Chaddock Hall and Henry Yates. The church's foundation stone was laid by the Countess of Ellesmere on 14 February 1885. The church was built in 1886 as a chapel of ease to the parish church in Tyldesley. Mosley Common was made into a separate parish in 1894. The Bishop of Manchester consecrated the church in 1895 when the Earl of Ellesmere provided money to establish an endowment.

== Church ==
The church is constructed in Yorkshire freestone in the neo-Gothic style with a chancel, nave and aisles. The bells were the gift of John Higham of Swinton and his wife gave the lectern. Mrs Harrison gave the font, Mrs Whitehead the reredos and Mrs Brown the pulpit.
