= St George's Church, Tyldesley =

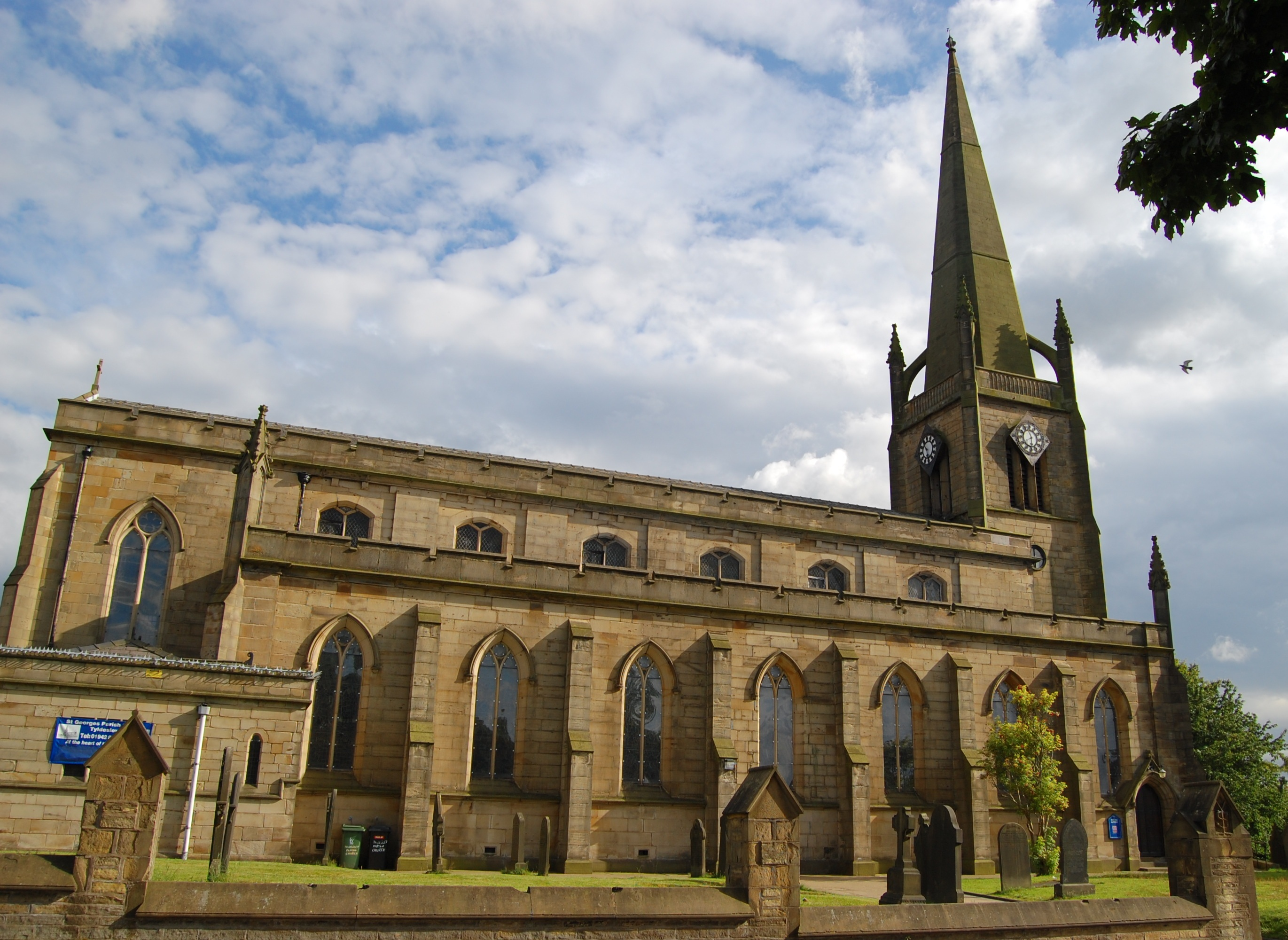
- Tyldesley Parish Church from the north
- St George's Church, Tyldesley
- 53.5135°N 2.4714°W
- OS grid reference: SD 688 019
- Location: Lower Elliot Street, Tyldesley, Greater Manchester
- Country: England
- Denomination: Anglican
- Website: The Parish Church of St George

History
- Status: Parish church
- Dedication: St George
- Consecrated: 19 September 1825

Architecture
- Functional status: Active
- Heritage designation: Grade II
- Designated: 18 July 1966
- Architect: Sir Robert Smirke
- Architectural type: Church
- Style: Gothic Revival
- Groundbreaking: November 1821
- Completed: 1887

Specifications
- Capacity: 1,100 (originally)
- Length: 112 feet (34 m)
- Width: 60 feet (18 m)
- Materials: Sandstone

Administration
- Province: York
- Diocese: Manchester
- Archdeaconry: Salford
- Deanery: Leigh
- Parish: Tyldesley cum Shakerley

St George's Church is an Anglican parish church serving Tyldesley and Shakerley in Greater Manchester, England. It is part of Leigh deanery in the archdeaconry of Salford and the diocese of Manchester. The church, together with St Stephen's Church, Astley and St John's Church, Mosley Common is part of the united benefice of Astley, Tyldesley and Mosley Common.

A Waterloo Church, it was founded as a chapel of ease of the parish church in Leigh in 1825, in a rapidly expanding township. A mistake with plans led to a larger church than the site could accommodate and extra land and money was donated to ensure the church could be completed. The church was extended at the east end and re-seated in the 1880s and has survived two fires. The churchyard contains the graves of victims of a disaster at Yew Tree Colliery. In 1966 the church was designated a Grade II listed building.

== History ==
Up to 1789, when the Countess of Huntingdon's Connexion built Tyldesley Top Chapel, the population of Tyldesley was dependent on the parish church in Leigh, an ancient ecclesiastical parish that, from medieval times, covered six townships. As the population grew quickly after 1800, a movement seeking to have an established church in the township developed. Thomas Johnson, owner of the Banks Estate gave land at the western end of the banks on which to build a Commissioners' Church. It was paid for by money from the parliament of the United Kingdom raised by the Church Building Act 1818, and said to be a celebration of Britain's victory in the Battle of Waterloo. £17,000 (equivalent to £1,370,000 as of 2025), was promised by the Church Building Commissioners. The architect was Robert Smirke. It was one of 174 neo-Gothic and 40 Classical style churches built under the Act.

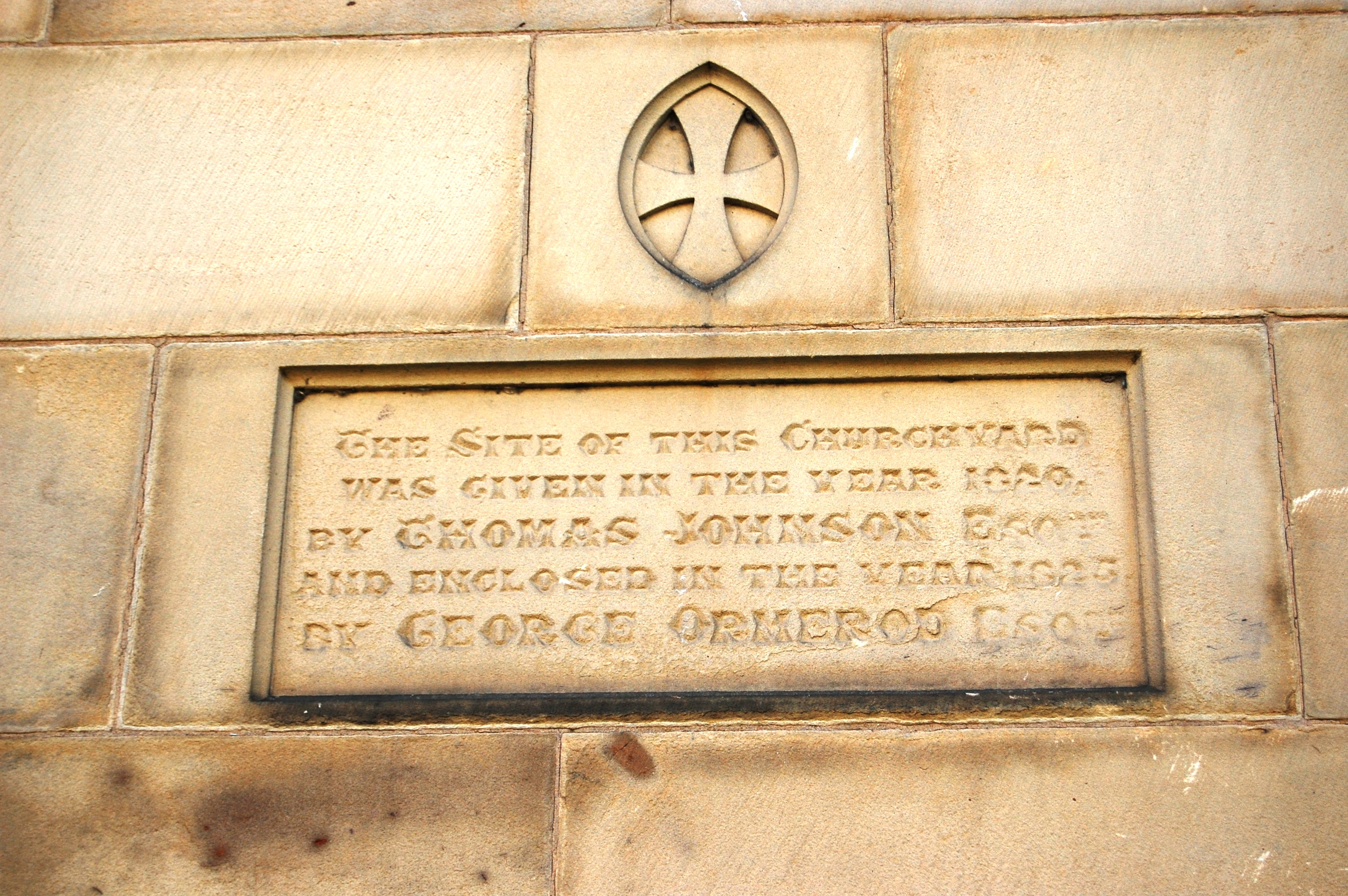
"The site of this churchyard was given in the year 1820 by Thomas Johnson Esq. and enclosed in the year 1825 by George Ormerod Esq."

Work began in November 1821 and the foundation stone was laid on 23 April 1822—St George's Day. As construction progressed, it was realised that the structure was too big for the site and that the plans had been inadvertently exchanged for the Church of St George in Chorley. Thomas Johnson's nephew, George Ormerod gave more land for the churchyard and £2,000 (equivalent to £160,000 as of 2025), so that the church could be finished. Building work was completed in November 1824. Bells for the tower were transported on carts from Leigh on 10 August 1825 arriving to celebrations in the town when the largest bell was upturned and filled with ale supplied by all the local inns.

The chapel was consecrated on 19 September 1825 by the Bishop of Chester and dedicated to Saint George. It was licensed as a chapel of ease of Leigh Parish Church and known as St George's Chapel. Tyldesley became a district parish in August 1829. On the last day of 1833 the curate, the Reverend Jacob Robson, writing in the parish registers, signalled the change in the spelling of the township name from Tildesley to Tyldesley.

The church was altered and refurbished in 1886 and 1887 when the east end was extended by 12 feet to form a new chancel. At the same time the vestry and entrance porch were added to the north side and the west end of the church was remodelled by architects Preston and Vaughn and the work completed by contractors Cordingley and Stopford. The large west gallery was removed and a smaller one installed. Central doors were hung in an archway below the gallery. The woodwork was by J. Pearson of Pendleton. The nave and aisle roofs were panelled in pitch pine, the wooden floor was replaced and the windows were reglazed. Paint was removed from the interior stonework and the columns were reduced in thickness. The church was relit and a heating system by J. Grundy of Tyldesley was installed.

In 1920 a War Memorial Chapel, known as the Lady Chapel was dedicated.

St George's has survived two fires, the first in 1878 when the upper west galley housing the choir and organ was destroyed causing their removal to the chancel. The second fire, in 1966, destroyed half the roof and part of the ceiling.

In 1886 St John's Church at Mosley Common was built as a chapel-of-ease to St George's.

== Structure ==
Sandstone for St George's was quarried at Peel Quarry in Little Hulton. The church was built in the Early English Gothic style with a seven-bay nave and clerestory which, according to Pevsner have, "unconvincing Geometric aisle windows and squashed Y-tracery on the clerestory". The chancel has two-light windows to the south and north walls and a three-light east window, all with geometrical tracery. On the north side is a vestry and a porch in the westernmost bay. The church is 112 feet (34 m) in length and 60 feet (18 m) in width.

The tower at the west end has a west door and rises in three stages to a parapet with crocketed pinnacles and flying buttresses at each corner to a recessed octagonal spire that rises to 150 feet (46 m) in height. At its second stage is a lancet window, and at the third stage, three lancet belfry openings and a clock face to each side of the tower.

== Fittings and furniture ==
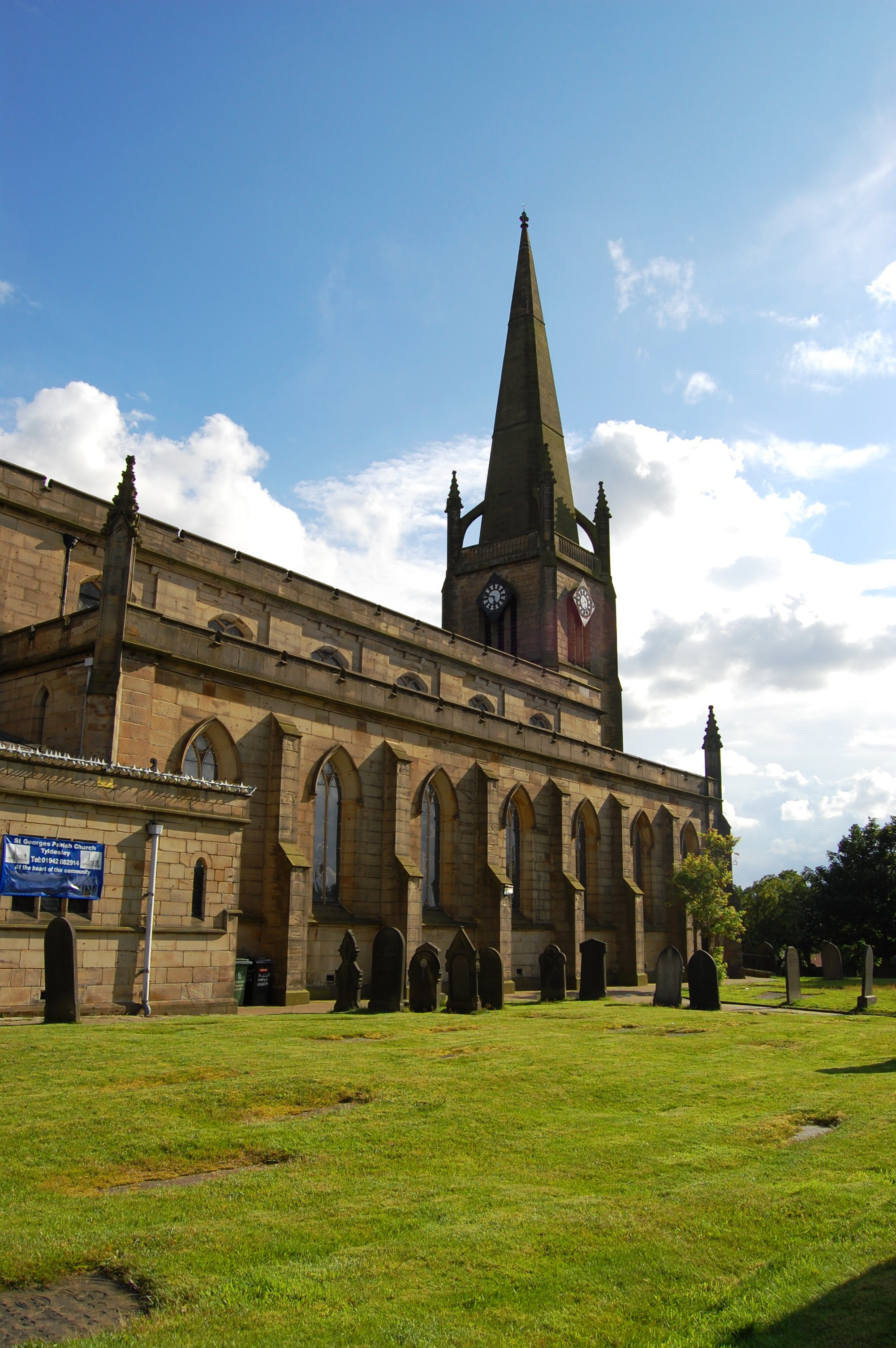
St George's north side and spire

The tower contains a peal of eight bells, the original six were cast in 1825 by William Dobson at Downham Market in Norfolk. In 1910 the bells were rehung and two trebles by Mears and Stainbank added. In the 1960s, subsidence and cracks in the tower prevented the bells being rung but an inspection in 2012 revealed the bells could be rung after repairs to the frame. The Lancashire Association of Change Ringers paid for the repairs and the bells were rung again in December 2012.

The town's first public clock, with three faces was installed on the tower in 1847, it was paid for by public subscription. A four-faced clock installed in 1913, wound by hand until 1967, now has an electrical movement. In 1937, electricity superseded gas for lighting. After 1912 the town council was responsible for the cost of repairs and illumination.

The church, when first built, could seat 1,100 people. The church retains its west gallery, originally there were two but the upper gallery was destroyed in a fire. The original 1825 font was replaced by a larger one in 1853. In 1860 an organ was bought from Willis of London for £350 replacing a barrel organ given by George Ormerod when the church opened.

Most of the church woodwork dates from the extensions and refurbishment in 1887. The chancel woodwork is in American walnut and was carved by Earp of Manchester. The wooden altar is elaborately carved as is the reredos. The pulpit is in carved walnut on a base of Mansfield red stone. A new case was made for the organ at the east end of the south aisle. New pitch pine pews were stained and polished to match the chancel woodwork and replaced the original box pews.

The stained glass in the east window was designed by William Pointer of Manchester and dates from 1956. On either side of the window are mosaic panels dated 1914, each of which depicts two evangelists. The stained-glass windows depicting saints in the north and south walls of the chancel date from the 19th century and were moved from Bishopscourt, the former palace of the Bishops of Manchester, in about 1958. Monuments include one dated 1855 showing a "grieving woman slumped over an urn" and a bronze plaque from 1924.

== Clergy ==
During its first hundred years, St George's had four incumbents.

- Jacob Robson became curate in 1825, Tyldesley became a parish in 1829 and he became vicar in 1842; he died in 1851.
- George Richards was vicar between 1851 and 1884; during his time he buried 14 of the 25 victims of the Yew Tree Colliery firedamp explosion in the churchyard in 1858.
- John Lund was vicar between 1884 and 1920; he oversaw the extension of the east end of the church in 1886 and the building of the vicarage in 1902.
- Samuel Flemming was vicar between 1920 and 1948.

== Notable burials ==
Burial records of the church, which survive from its opening in 1825, record a total of 6592 burials between 1825 and 1938. Among those are:

- Joseph Higginson, buried 21 September 1881. Higginson was the last surviving veteran of the Invasion of Java in 1811 during the Napoleonic Wars and was later photographed in 1877. He was awarded the Naval General Service Medal (1847) in 1847, for those actions.
- James Burton, buried 15 February 1868. Burton owned James Burton & Sons, the largest mill-owning business in Lancashire during the 19th century.

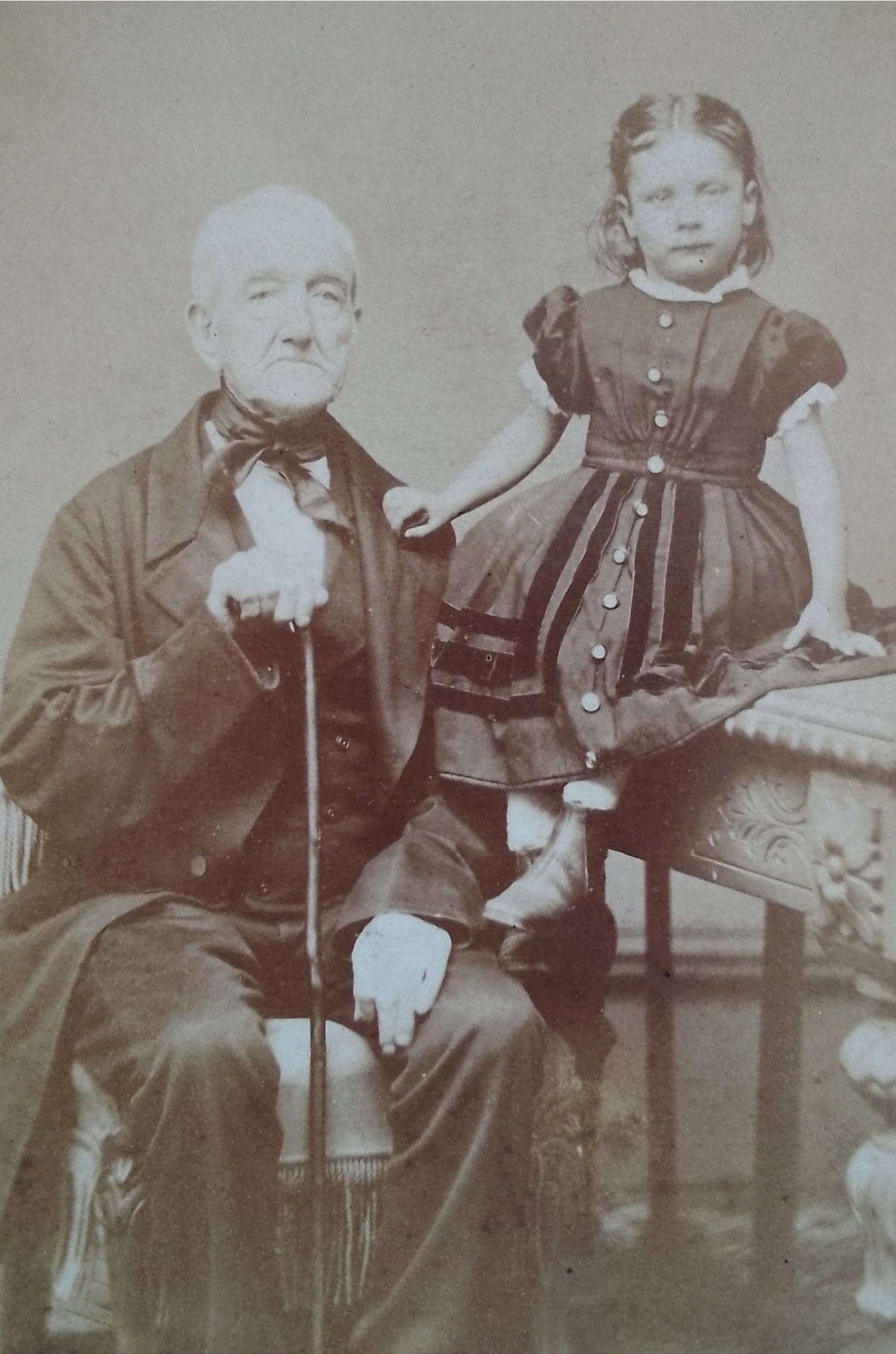
Joseph Higginson (1792–1881)

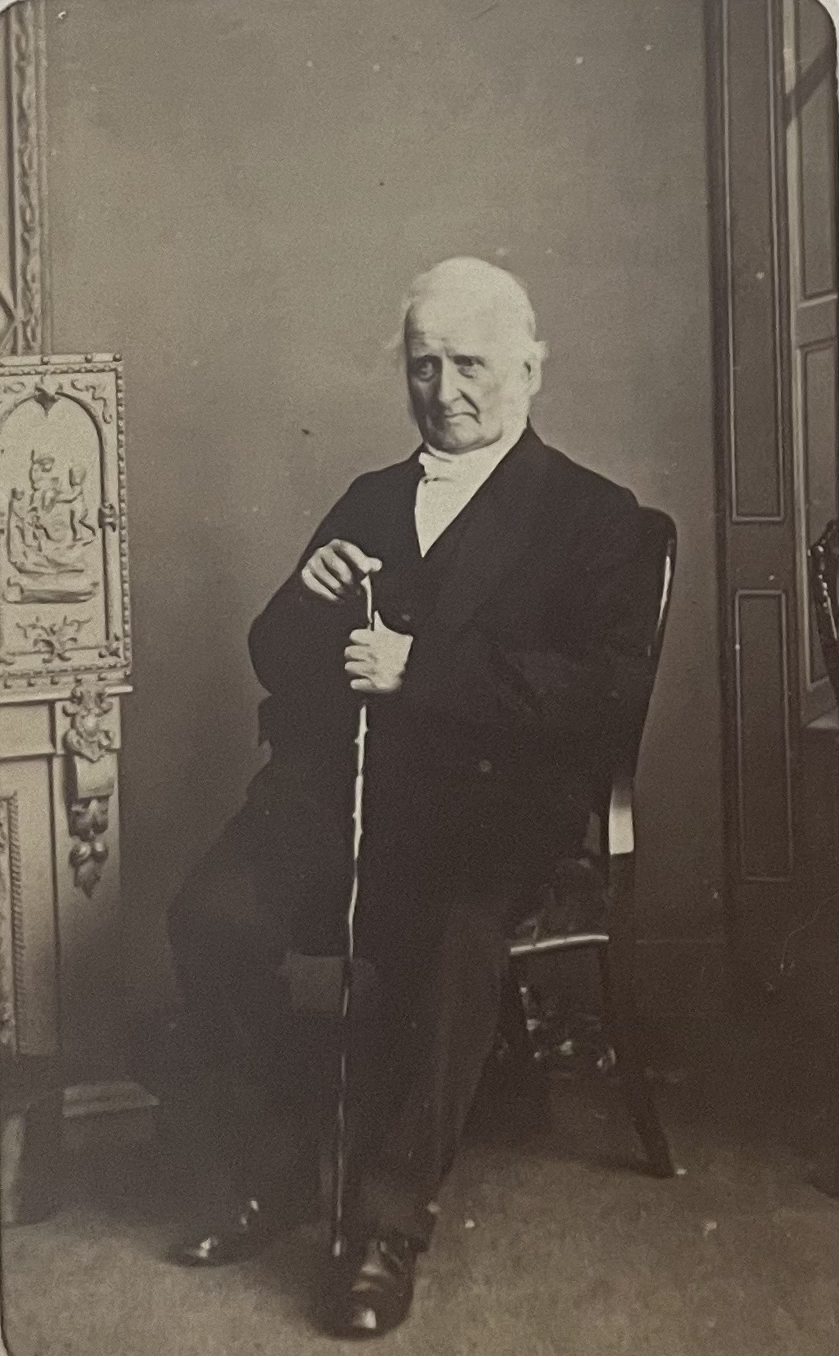
James Burton (1784–1868)

== See also ==
- List of churches in Greater Manchester
- List of Commissioners' churches in Northeast and Northwest England
- Listed buildings in Tyldesley
