= Listed buildings in Tyldesley =

Tyldesley is a town in the Metropolitan Borough of Wigan, in Greater Manchester, England. It contains 15 listed buildings designated by English Heritage and included in the National Heritage List for England. Of these, one is listed at Grade II*, the middle of the three grades, and the others are at Grade II, the lowest grade.

The town's listed buildings reflect its history. Three ancient halls in the south and east, Damhouse, Chaddock and Garrett, remain from when Tyldesley was a scattered rural settlement before it developed into an industrial town after 1800. Two places of worship, Top Chapel and the parish church were built as the town's population began to increase as was the former St. George's School, built as a national school in the 1820s of which only its stone-built façade remains. Nikolaus Pevsner describes Tyldesley as "a small industrial town of parallel brick streets" and considers its best building is the "handsome former Union Bank of Manchester" on Elliott Street.

== Key ==
Grade	Criteria
II*	Particularly important buildings of more than special interest
II	Buildings of national importance and special interest

== Buildings and structures ==
Name and location	Photograph	Date	Notes	Grade
Chaddock Hall; 53.5052°N 2.4372°W	—	17th century	Chaddock Hall is a brick and timber-framed house that has been rendered over. It is of two-storeys on a T-shaped plan with an 18th-century range under a slate roof. A datestone at the rear is inscribed "T.C. 1698" (Thomas Chaydock) and a lead rainwater-head is dated "S.C. 1780".	II
Barn at Chaddock Hall; 53.5048°N 2.4359°W	—	17th century	The barn at Chaddock Hall is constructed mostly in English garden wall bond brick with stone dressings and quoins on a stone plinth. It had opposed cart entries with cambered brick arches and one wall has a carved stone coat of arms.	II
Garden wall and stone gate piers, Chaddock Hall; 53.5047°N 2.4363°W	—	17th century	Chaddock Hall's garden walls are built in English garden wall bond brick and its stone gate piers to Chaddock Lane have raised panels and moulded bases, collars and capitals. The gates are made of cast-iron.	II
Garrett Hall; 53.510°N 2.442°W		17th century	The 17th-century farmhouse was formerly a manor house and home of the Tyldesley family. The two-storey, timber-framed structure was built on a T-shaped plan. It was altered in the 18th and 19th centuries when it was largely rebuilt in brick. It has a slate roof, brick chimney stacks and its walls were rendered in the 20th century.	II
Damhouse; 53.503°N 2.456°W		1650	Damhouse or Astley Hall was the manor house for Astley though it is inside the Tyldesley boundary. It was used as the administration block for Astley Hospital. Since 1991 Morts Astley Heritage Trust has renovated it for office use and tea room. The house is built of rendered brick with stone details and a slate roof. The three-storey frontage has five unequal bays with stone mullioned windows and crosswing gables. The central three-storey porch bay has a studded oak door with Doric columns, pediment and a fanlight. The frontage is largely as built but the plaque over the door is a 20th-century replacement. The east wing dating from the early 19th century is of rendered brick and has a chapel on the first floor. Restoration in 1999–2000 discovered the attic contained a "short" long gallery that had subsequently been subdivided.	II*
7 Sale Lane; 53.513°N 2.446°W		1685	The gable-fronted house is built from hammer-dressed stone with a slate roof and a brick-built extension. It has stone mullion windows, quoins and a round window in the gable.	II
109 Sale Lane; 53.514°N 2.442°W	—	Late 17th century	The two-storey house is built in English garden wall bond brick with stone quoins under a slate roof which replaced the original thatch.	II
Tyldesley Top Chapel; 53.513°N 2.467°W		1789	The chapel was built in 1789 for the Countess of Huntingdon's Connexion in Flemish bond brick. It has a gabled front with a bellcote and two panelled doors between which on each floor are Venetian style windows with leaded glass.	II
St George's Church; 53.513°N 2.471°W		1821–24	St. George's Church is a Commissioners' Church designed by Sir Robert Smirke and consecrated in 1825. It is built in the Early English style in sandstone ashlar. It has a nave with a clerestory and north and south aisles a west tower with an octagonal spire, a chancel and vestry.	II
Stone built portion of St George's School; 53.513°N 2.470°W		1829	The facade of the former St George's School is built in dressed sandstone and has a slate roof. It comprises two storeys and seven bays in a Gothic revival style. The doorways at either end (one blocked) have pointed arches and the windows Y-tracery. A carved plaque reads, "Tyldsley Church Schools MDCCCIX rebuilt and enlarged MDCCCLVIII".	II
138 Elliot Street; 53.5139°N 2.4686°W		1830	The two-storey house is built in red brick in Flemish bond with a Welsh slate roof. It fronts directly to the street and has two stone steps to central door flanked by fluted side pilasters and a fanlight with radial glazing bars under segmental brick arch. The bays have 16-pane sash windows under flat arches.	II
Drinking fountain 53.5141°N 2.4676°W		1892	The drinking fountain designed in the Gothic Revival style has a square shaft on stone steps. On each face are niches one bearing the inscription: "Donated by John Buckley 1812–1892". Narrow decorative columns support gablets bearing coats of arms and a square tapering shaft takes the place of a roof.	II
151 Elliot Street, former bank 53.5141°N 2.4688°W		1900	The single-storey bank, now offices, was built on a corner site to the designs of F W Morton. It is constructed in sandstone ashlar with a glazed roof. It has a three-bay front and two-bay left return facing Patchett Street. Its Classical facade has Doric order columns supporting a dentilled cornice and balustraded parapet on a plinth with pedestals. Its central doorway is under a frieze with 'BANK' in raised letters above which is the coat of arms of the Union Bank of Manchester. At either side are windows in rusticated surrounds with keystones.	II
Tyldesley public library 53.51446°N 2.46795°W		1909	A Carnegie library in Ruabon brick and Runcorn red sandstone, it is partly steel framed, and has a tile roof. The entrance front has two storeys and an attic, and three bays, the bays separated by giant brick pilasters. The ground floor is in stone with a rusticated plinth. The central entrance is flanked by Gibbsian blocked columns, and has a fanlight and an open segmental pediment. The windows in the outer bays have moulded round arches with console keystones. The upper floor windows have aprons, and above them is a moulded cornice, and a parapet with a central Diocletian window.	II
Telephone kiosk 53.5138°N 2.4677°W		1935 (designed)	The red K6 telephone kiosks were designed by Sir Giles Gilbert Scott. The kiosks were manufactured in cast iron by various contractors. The kiosk has a square plan, a domed roof and the top panels are decorated with unperforated crowns.	II
