= Henry Ratcliffe =

English actuary and friendly society administrator

- Born: 4 November 1808; Tyldesley
- Died: 25 May 1877 (aged 68)
- Occupation: Actuary

Henry Ratcliffe (4 November 1808 – 25 May 1877) was an English actuary and friendly society administrator.

== Biography ==
Ratcliffe born at Tyldesley, Lancashire, on 4 November 1808, joined the Chowbent division of the Manchester Unity of Oddfellows in 1833, became provincial grandmaster in 1836, then provincial secretary of his district, and finally, in 1848, secretary of the whole order. Ratcliffe soon displayed great financial ability, and with conspicuous success devoted himself to vital statistics, at the time a comparatively new study. In 1850 he brought out his ‘Observations of the Rate of Mortality and Sickness existing among Friendly Societies,’ which at once became a standard authority. The monetary tables which were appended were thenceforth known as the ‘Ratcliffe Tables,’ and the data dealing with thirty-one trades proved of permanent value. In 1852 Ratcliffe issued a supplement, giving further financial details, and recommending a quinquennial valuation of the assets and liabilities of all friendly societies—a suggestion which was adopted by government in 1870. In 1862 Ratcliffe republished his actuarial tables, basing them on far wider calculations. In 1871 he undertook a special valuation of his society, which his labours had placed on a sound actuarial basis. He was nominated a public valuer under the Friendly Societies Act of 1870. Ratcliffe, who was a congregationalist, died at the society's offices in Manchester on 25 May 1877, and was buried at Brooklands cemetery, near Sale, where the Manchester Unity erected a monument to his memory.
