= New Hall moated site =

Coordinates: 53.5060°N 2.4546°W

New Hall moated site is a scheduled monument in Tyldesley, Greater Manchester, England. It includes a moat and an island platform on which a modern house has been built. The island was the site of a medieval building. The moat measures between 20 and 30 metres across and is widest at the south west corner where the water soaks away to join a stream. The moat was revetted on the south side but the stonework is destroyed and is bridged on the same side by a modern stone bridge which replaced a timber structure. The rectangular island, measuring 60 metres by 40 metres, encloses an area of 0.25 hectares (0.62 acres) and is 0.4 metres above the surrounding land. Archaeological evidence of the medieval buildings will be present on the island and the moat will retain other environmental evidence. A ruined post-medieval farmhouse occupied a third of the island in 1983. The present modern buildings are excluded from the scheduling, although the ground beneath them is part of the schedule.

== History ==
New Hall, in the Park of Tyldesley, close to Damhouse by the Astley, Greater Manchester border, was in existence before 1422 when it belonged to Thomas Tyldesley. The hall and its 8.1 hectares (20 acres) acres of land was the subject of a feud between the Tyldesleys and the Hultons of Hulton Park which ended in 1422 when Roger Hulton gave up any title he had to Hugh Tyldesley.

Its occupant in 1692 was Henry Marsh who was elected overseer of the poor for Tyldesley lower side. It was described as a mansion house in 1716 when it was leased to a widow named Heyes. By 1742 Thomas Smith, a farmer, was tenant. In 1838 the property and its 23 Cheshire acres of land were owned by Lord Francis Edgerton who leased it to John Lawton. The tenant from 1853 to 1872 was Richard Grundy and it acquired the nickname, Dicky Beefs.
