= Tyldesley =

Market town in Greater Manchester, England

- Town
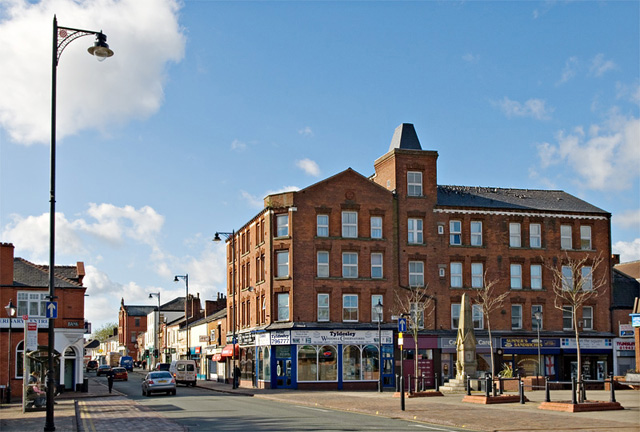
- Marklands Buildings and Elliott Street

- Location within Greater Manchester
- Population: 16,142 (2011 Census)
- OS grid reference: SD690023
  - London: 170 mi (274 km) SE
- Metropolitan borough: Wigan
- Metropolitan county: Greater Manchester
- Region: North West
- Country: England
- Sovereign state: United Kingdom
- Post town: MANCHESTER
- Postcode district: M29
- Dialling code: 01942
- Police: Greater Manchester
- Fire: Greater Manchester
- Ambulance: North West
- UK Parliament: Leigh and Atherton

Tyldesley (/ˈtɪlzliː/) is a market town in the Metropolitan Borough of Wigan in Greater Manchester, England. Within the boundaries of the historic county of Lancashire, it is north of Chat Moss near the foothills of the West Pennine Moors, eight miles (13 kilometres) southeast of Wigan and nine miles (14 kilometres) northwest of Manchester. At the 2001 United Kingdom census, the Tyldesley built-up area subdivision, excluding Shakerley, had a population of 16,142.

The remains of a Roman road passing through the township on its ancient course between Coccium (Wigan) and Mamucium (Manchester) were evident during the 19th century. Following the Anglo-Saxon settlement of Britain, Tyldesley was part of the manor of Warrington, until the Norman Conquest of England, when the settlement constituted a township called Tyldesley-with-Shakerley in the ancient parish of Leigh.

The factory system and textile manufacture during the Industrial Revolution triggered population growth and urbanisation, and by the early 20th century it was said that the mill town was "eminently characteristic of an industrial district whose natural features have been almost entirely swept away to give place to factories, iron foundries, and collieries". After industrial activity declined in the late 20th century, land reclamation and post-war residential developments have altered the landscape and encouraged economic activity along Elliott Street.

== History ==
=== Toponymy ===
Tyldesley, meaning "Tilwald's clearing", is derived from the Old English (OE) personal name Tīlwald and leăh a "wood, clearing", suggesting that what is now open land was once covered with forest. The name was recorded as Tildesleiha in 1210. Alternative spellings include Tildeslei, Tildeslege, Tildeslegh and Tildesley. Tyldesley is situated at the edge of the Lancashire Plain north of Chat Moss, and the Banks is a sandstone ridge where the foothills of the Pennines begin and gave the town its early name of Tildsley Banks. The land rises from 100 feet (30 m) at the foot of the banks to 250 feet (76 m) at the highest point. Tyldesley is pronounced "Til-slee", and locally known as "Bongs". In local pronunciation "Banks" was corrupted to "Bongs". The old name for Mosley Common was the "Hurst" or "Tyldesleyhurst"; the suffix "hyrst" means a wooded hill (OE).

=== Earliest history ===
The remains of a Roman road serving camps at Coccium (Wigan) and Mamucium (Manchester) passed through the area. It ran from Keeper Delph in Boothstown crossing Mort Lane north west of Cleworth Hall and south of Shakerley Old Hall. The road continued towards the Valley at Atherton where coins have been found, and on towards Gibfield and Wigan.

In 1947, two urns containing about 550 Roman bronze coins, minted between AD 259 and AD 278, were found near the old Tyldesley–Worsley border. The coins are in the British Museum. After the end of Roman rule in Britain and into the history of Anglo-Saxon England, nothing was written about Tyldesley. Evidence for the presence of Saxons is provided by place names incorporating the Old English suffix leah, such as Tyldesley, Shakerley, and Astley.

=== Manor houses ===
The manor house was Astley Hall which, in 1212, was home to Hugh Tyldesley, Lord of the manors of Astley and Tyldesley. It is just inside the Tyldesley boundary but has been associated with Astley since the death of Henry Tyldesley in 1301, when the manor was divided among three sons. The Tyldesleys had a "reputation for lawlessness and who had frequent disputes with their neighbours". One exception was Hugh Tyldesley, Hugh the Pious, who endowed Cockersand Abbey with land in Shakerley before his death in 1226. The moated New Hall in the Park of Tyldesley, close to the old manor house was in existence before 1422 when it belonged to Thomas Tyldesley.

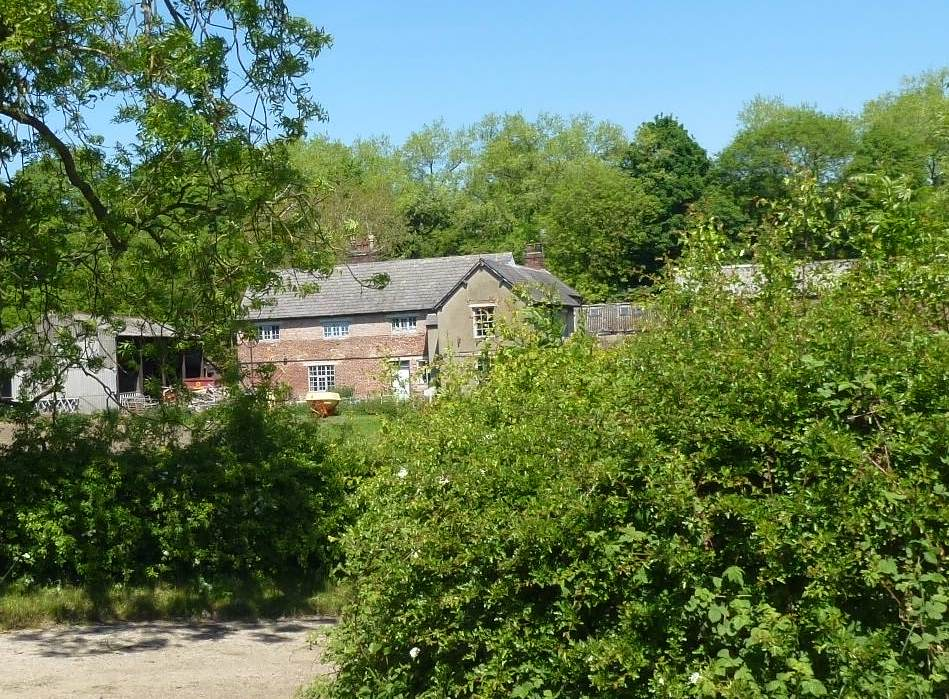
Garrett Hall is now a farmhouse

The new manor, known as the Garrett, was owned by John Tyldesley in 1505. The timber-framed Garrett Hall remained with the Tyldesleys until 1652 when Lambert Tyldesley died leaving no heir. The new owners, the Stanleys, leased it to tenant farmers. In 1732 it was sold to Thomas Clowes who also leased the property to tenants. In 1829 the estate was bought by the Bridgewater Trustees.

The township had several other significant houses. Generations of the Shakerley family lived in Shakerley Old Hall, close to the Shakerley Brook and Roman road. In medieval times they paid rent to Cockersand Abbey and dues of "one pair of white gloves at the feast of Easter" to Adam Tyldesley. Chaddock Hall was home to a family of yeomen farmers. Its name was variously recorded as Chaydok, Chaidoke and Chaidok, the last syllable probably meaning "oak". It was surrounded by a hamlet in the east of the township. The Chaddocks, like the Tyldesleys and Shakerleys, had a reputation for lawlessness.

The tenants of the Tyldesley, Shakerley and Chaddock lands were summoned for military service. Archers from Chaddock fought at Crécy in 1346 and at the Battle of Agincourt in 1415. In 1360, William Chaddock was described as an archer on foot, "potens de corpore et bonis". (Note: fit for active service in body and equipment) A muster roll described Hugh Tyldesley as an archer on horseback and Hugh Chaddock and Richard Tyldesley were foot-archers drawing daily pay for service from 22 July to 21 October 1391.

Cleworth Hall, recorded as Cluworth in 1333, was part of the Tyldesley lands on higher ground north of the high road. It passed to Nicholas Starkie of Huntroyde by his marriage to Anne Parr in 1578 and in 1594 was associated with witchcraft. Two children, John and Anne Starkie became "possessed of evil spirits". A well-known "conjurer" or wise man, Edmund Hartley, was asked to cure them, which he apparently did before demanding money which was refused. Hartley threatened trouble and Starkie denounced him and Hartley was taken for trial to Lancaster Castle in 1597 where he was tried and found guilty of witchcraft. He was hanged, twice, as the rope broke at the first attempt.

=== Banks Estate ===
In the early 18th century Tyldesley was a collection of cottages and farms around the halls scattered across the township with no church or inn. Thomas Johnson, a Bolton merchant bought the Banks Estate in 1728, land from the Stanleys of Garrett Hall in 1742 and Davenports in the west of the township in 1752. He died in 1764 leaving his estate to his grandson with the same name. Thomas "Squire" Johnson developed the town of Tildsley Banks. His name lives on in Squires Lane and Johnson Street. The last quarter of the 18th century marked the beginning of a building boom and the grid plan of the town centre is from this date.

John Aikin described the area in 1795 in his book A Description of the Countryside from 30 to 40 Miles around Manchester:

The Banks of Tildesley, in the Parish of Leigh, are about one mile and a half in length, and command a most beautiful prospect into seven counties: the springs remarkably clear and most excellently adapted to the purposes of bleaching. The land is rich, but mostly in meadow and pastures, for milk, butter, and the noted Leigh cheese. The estate had, in the year 1780, only two farm houses and eight or nine cottages, but now contains 162 houses, a neat chapel, and 976 inhabitants, who employ 325 looms in the cotton Manufactories ...

Tyldesley's first inns were the Flaming Castle built in 1778 and the Green Dragon of 1781. Fulwell House in Squires Lane was built in 1792 and occupied by local industrialists but was demolished in 1935. Towards the end of the 18th century rows of two-storey brick terraced houses were built at the west end of the town to house workers who had migrated there to work in the new factories.

=== Industrial Revolution ===
Until the Industrial Revolution, Tyldesley was rural, agriculture and cottage spinning and weaving, mainly muslin and fustian, were the chief occupations before 1800. Silk weaving became an important cottage industry after 1827 when silk was brought from Manchester.

In 1772 Thomas Johnson opened the "Little Factory" for carding and spinning cotton. "The Great Leviathon" powered a steam-driven mill for woollen spinning on Factory Street in 1792. More cotton mills were built close to the Hindsford and Shakerley Brooks which provided water for steam power. In 1823, after a strike for increased wages and lockout by the millowners at New Mills, owned by J & G Jones in Factory Street, the workforce was sacked and new hands hired to replace them. The scab labourers, knobsticks had to be protected from assault by the dismissed workers. Joseph Wilson built Hope Mill in James Street. By 1838 James Burton owned most of the town's mills. He lived in Charles Street surrounded by his workers' houses. His company owned 74 cottages and 57 cellars, a house in Elliot Street and the King's Arms public house. Burton died in 1868. In 1883 a fire at Burton's mills caused £15,000 damage (equivalent to £1,600,000 in 2025) and by 1920 his mills were demolished. Caleb Wright owned Barnfield Mills which had a workforce of about 800. The last of his mills, Barnfield No 6 on Shuttle Street, was built in 1894 on the site of Resolution Mill which was destroyed by fire in 1891. Barnfield No 6 was a concrete-floored multi-storey mill for spinning, powered by an external engine house via a rope race. The mill was demolished in the 1990s and the site is occupied by a supermarket.

Coal had been got in Shakerley since at least 1429 when a dispute was recorded between the Shakerleys and the Tyldesleys over the stealing of "seacoals". Shakerley Colliery on Shakerley Common was in existence in 1798. Shakerley was a centre for making nails, but was in decline by 1800.

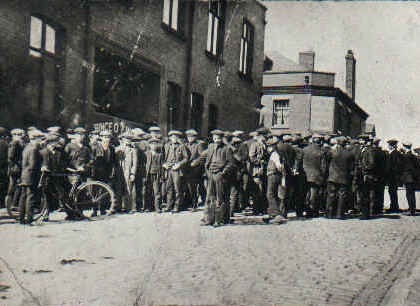
Miners outside the Miners Hall during the 1926 General Strike

After the railway was completed in 1864, coal mining became the dominant industry and the town was surrounded by collieries for more than 100 years until the industry declined after the Second World War. Bridgewater Collieries, Tyldesley Coal Company, Shakerley Collieries and Astley and Tyldesley Collieries were among the local mine owners. Gin Pit Colliery closed in 1955, Cleworth Hall in 1963, Nook two years later, and Mosley Common in 1968. Tyldesley Miners' Association, established in 1862, at the instigation of Robert Isherwood, built the Miner's Hall in 1893 and the Astley and Tyldesley Miner's Club opened at Gin Pit in 1927.

The worst mining disaster in the town occurred at Yew Tree Colliery on 11 December 1858 when an explosion of firedamp caused by a safety lamp cost 25 lives. The youngest victim was 11 and the oldest 35 years of age. Some of the victims are buried in the churchyard at St George's Church. Another explosion on 6 March 1877 at Great Boys Colliery cost eight lives and on 2 October 1883, six men died when the cage rope broke at Nelson Colliery in Shakerley. On 1 October 1895 five men including the colliery manager and undermanager died at Shakerley Colliery after an explosion of firedamp.

Grundy's Foundry was another important employer. Its founder, John Grundy invented a warm air heating system that was used in churches and halls. He built a foundry close to the railway in Lower Elliot Street.

Industry declined after the Second World War and subsequent land reclamation and new housing developments have changed the face of the town, but its centre retains the atmosphere of a bustling market town, with a refurbished market square. The steep terraces branching off the main streets give the town a distinctive character.

== Governance ==
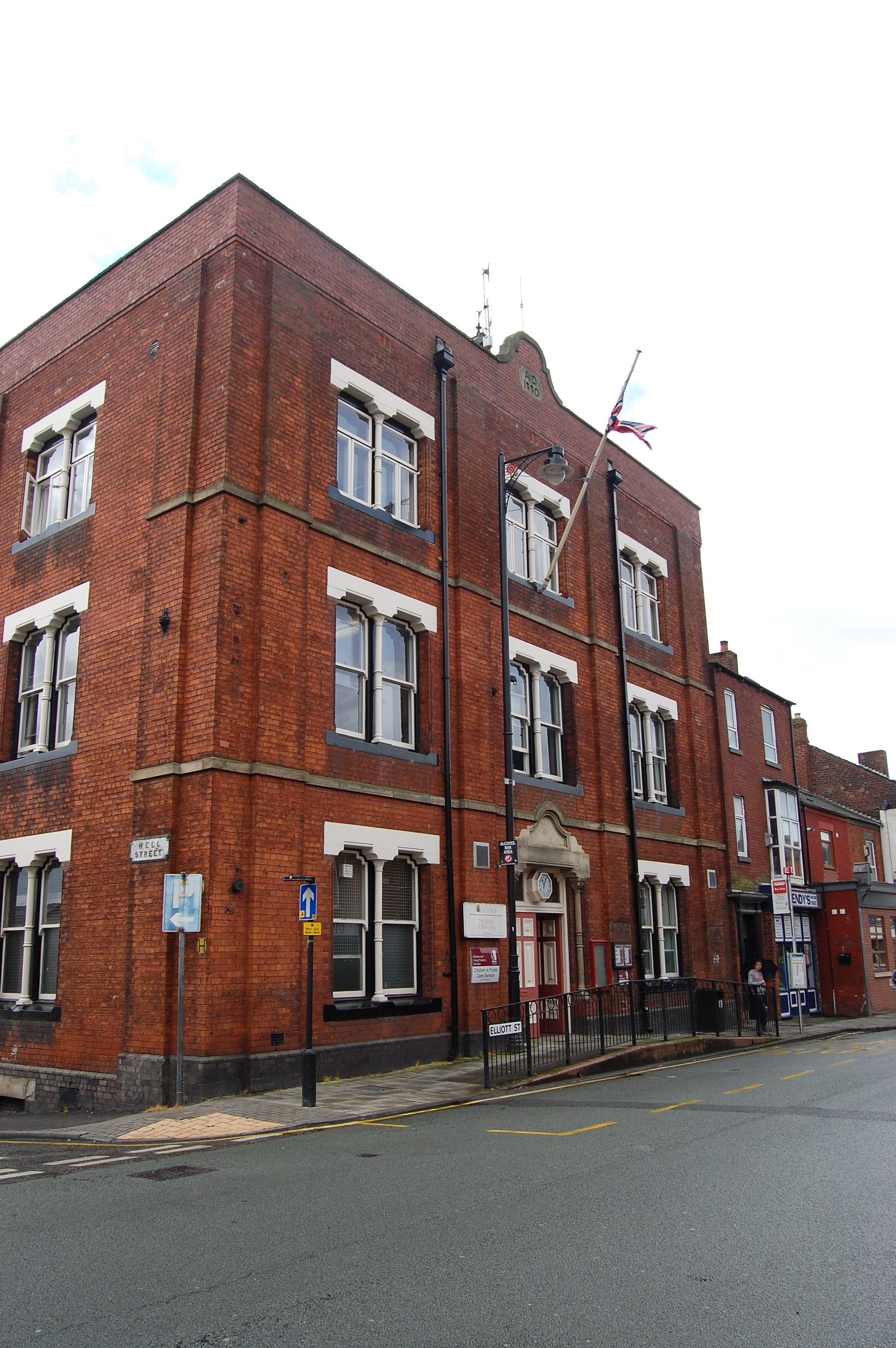
Tyldesley Town Hall, from 1924 the headquarters of the former Tyldesley Urban District Council. It was built as the Liberal Club in 1881.

Historically, Tyldesley formed part of the Hundred of West Derby, a judicial division of southwest Lancashire. Tyldesley cum Shakerley was one of the six townships or vills that made up and predated the ancient parish of Leigh. It was the largest of the townships at 2,610 acres (1,060 ha): Tyldesley having an area of 1,970 acres (800 ha) and Shakerley 520 acres (210 ha).

Under the terms of the Poor Law Amendment Act 1834 the townships formed part of the Leigh Poor Law Union comprising an area covering the whole of the ancient parish of Leigh and part of Winwick, established on 26 January 1837. A workhouse in Tyldesley was replaced by Leigh Union workhouse at Atherleigh in the 1850s. Tyldesley was constituted a civil parish in 1866. In 1863 the Local Government Act 1858 was adopted and the township was governed by a local board of health. The first Tyldesley Local Board was formed after elections on 24 October 1863. Among those elected were mill owners, Caleb Wright and Oliver Burton (son of James Burton), and colliery owners, William Ramsden and George Green, a mixture of Tories and Liberals. The Local Board took over the gas works in 1865, built the first swimming baths and opened Tyldesley Cemetery in 1876 and built sewage works at Morleys Hall in Astley in 1884. The local board offices were in Lower Elliot Street, where it had a fire station and depot. Under the Public Health Act 1875 the local board gained additional powers as an urban sanitary district and under the Local Government Act 1894 Tyldesley-with-Shakerley became an urban district with an elected council. Tyldesley Town Hall, originally the township's Liberal Club, opened in 1881, and was taken over by Tyldesley Urban District Council as its headquarters in 1924. Tyldesley UDC opened Tyldesley Park in 1902, the Carnegie Library officially opened in 1909, and after World War I council housing was built at Sale Lane and Mosley Common and after World War II in Shakerley.

In 1933, Lancashire County Council reorganised districts in the county, with reference to the Local Government Act 1929. A new Tyldesley Urban District was formed by amalgamating Tyldesley with Shakerley Urban District and the civil parish of Astley from the abolished Leigh Rural District. The urban district was abolished in 1974 under the Local Government Act 1972, when the area became part of the Metropolitan Borough of Wigan, a local government district of the metropolitan county of Greater Manchester.

Tyldesley is an electoral ward of the Metropolitan Borough of Wigan electing three councillors to the 75-member metropolitan borough council, Wigan's local authority. As of 2015, two ward councillors represent the Labour Party and one is an independent.

The Boundary Commission recommended Tyldesley should be part of the Leigh constituency at the 2010 general election. At the 2010 General Election, Andy Burnham retained the Leigh seat for the Labour party with 24,295 votes and a majority of 15,011, representing 51.3% of the vote. Burnham was re-elected MP for the Leigh constituency in 2015 with 24,312 votes which was 53.9% of the total vote cast. Jo Platt, representing Labour, was elected in 2017 with 26,347 votes which was 56.2% of the total votes cast. Conservative James Grundy won the seat in 2019. However, when Grundy stood down ahead of the 2024 general election and the incorporation of the seat into the new revised constituency of Leigh and Atherton, Jo Platt subsequently returned to re-represent the seat with 19,971 votes, 48.5% of the total vote cast.

== Geography ==
Tyldesley

Climate chart (precipitation, max. and min. temperature)
J	F	M	A	M	J	J	A	S	O	N	D
70 8 2	70 8 2	50 10 3	63 13 5	51 16 8	58 19 10	54 21 12	69 21 12	63 18 10	88 14 7	82 10 4	79 7 2
- █ Average max. and min. temperatures in °C
- █ Precipitation totals in mm
Imperial conversion
J	F	M	A	M	J	J	A	S	O	N	D
2.8 46 36	2.8 46 36	2 50 37	2.5 55 41	2 61 46	2.3 66 50	2.1 70 54	2.7 70 54	2.5 64 50	3.5 57 45	3.2 50 39	3.1 45 36
- █ Average max. and min. temperatures in °F
- █ Precipitation totals in inches

At 53°30′59″N 2°28′0″W (53.5166°, −2.4668°), Tyldesley is situated eight miles (13 kilometres) east-southeast of Wigan and nine miles (14 kilometres) west-northwest of Manchester, and at the eastern end of the Metropolitan Borough of Wigan. Tyldesley and Shakerley cover 2,490 acres (1,010 hectares) Topographically Tyldesley is situated the edge of the Lancashire Plain just to the north of Chat Moss and the Banks of Tyldesley are where the foothills of the Pennines begin. The land rises from about 100 ft (30 m) at the foot of the banks to 250 ft (76 m) at the highest point. The banks, a sandstone escarpment with the scarp slope facing south and the gentler dip to the north, are about one and a half miles long. The underlying rocks are the coal measures of the Manchester Coalfield covered with boulder clay. Streams drain the area including the Shakerley and Hindsford Brooks which flow towards the Glaze Brook a tributary of the River Mersey.

Heavily industrialised during the 19th century, Tyldesley has become a residential area since the demise of the coal industry and closure of its cotton mills. The main road through Tyldesley is the A577 which runs on the high ground along the ridge on which the town centre is situated.

== Demography ==
Tyldesley population compared
2001 UK census	Tyldesley	Wigan (borough)	England
Total population	34,022	301,415	49,138,831
White	97.7%	98.7%	91.0%
Asian	0.7%	0.4%	4.6%
Black	0.3%	0.2%	2.3%

At the 2001 UK census, Tyldesley had a population of 34,022 and a population density of 13,789 inhabitants per square mile (5,324/km^{2}), with a female-to-male ratio of 100 to 97.4. Of those over 16 years old, 27.3% were single (never married), 47.8% married and 8.2% divorced. Although the proportion of divorced people was similar to that of Wigan and England, the rates of those who were single and married were significantly different from the national and Wigan averages (Wigan: 42.4% single, 36.6% married; England: 44.3% single, 34.7% married). Tyldesley's 13,621 households included 24.0% one-person, 46.1% married couples living together, 10.2% were co-habiting couples, and 9.0% single parents with their children. Of those aged 16–74, 27.0% had no academic qualifications, lower than 28.9% in all of England and much lower than the 35.3% for the Wigan borough.

=== Population change ===
Population growth in Tyldesley township 1881–1961
Year	1881	1891	1901	1911	1921	1931	1939	1951	1961
Population	9,954	12,891	14,843	15,582	15,650	14,846	17,851	18,101	16,813
Tyldesley Cum Shakerley CP/Tn

In 2001 Wigan Council's Tyldesley ward had a population of 13,459. In 2011 the ward population had increased to 14,341.

== Economy ==
Tyldesley employment compared
2001 UK Census	Tyldesley	Wigan (borough)	England
Population of working age	25,021	220,196	35,532,091
Full-time employment	46.8%	41.7%	40.8%
Part-time employment	11.9%	11.9%	11.8%
Self-employed	7.9%	6.2%	8.3%
Unemployed	2.7%	3.2%	3.3%
Retired	11.5%	13.7%	13.5%

According to the 2001 United Kingdom census, the industry of employment of residents aged 16–74 was 18.1% retail and wholesale, 16.5% manufacturing, 12.1% property and business services, 10.9% health and social work, 7.4% education, 7.1% transport and communications, 7.6% construction, 5.8% public administration, 5.0% finance, 4.1% hotels and restaurants, 0.8% energy and water supply, 0.5% agriculture, 0.1% mining, and 4.2% other. Compared with national figures, the town had a relatively low percentage working in agriculture. The census recorded the economic activity of residents aged 16–74, 2.6% students were with jobs, 3.2% students without jobs, 4.7% looking after home or family, 6.7% permanently sick or disabled, and 2.1% economically inactive for other reasons.

The main concentrations of employment are at Chaddock Lane between Astley and Mosley Common and at Parr Brow to the north of Mosley Common.

== Landmarks ==
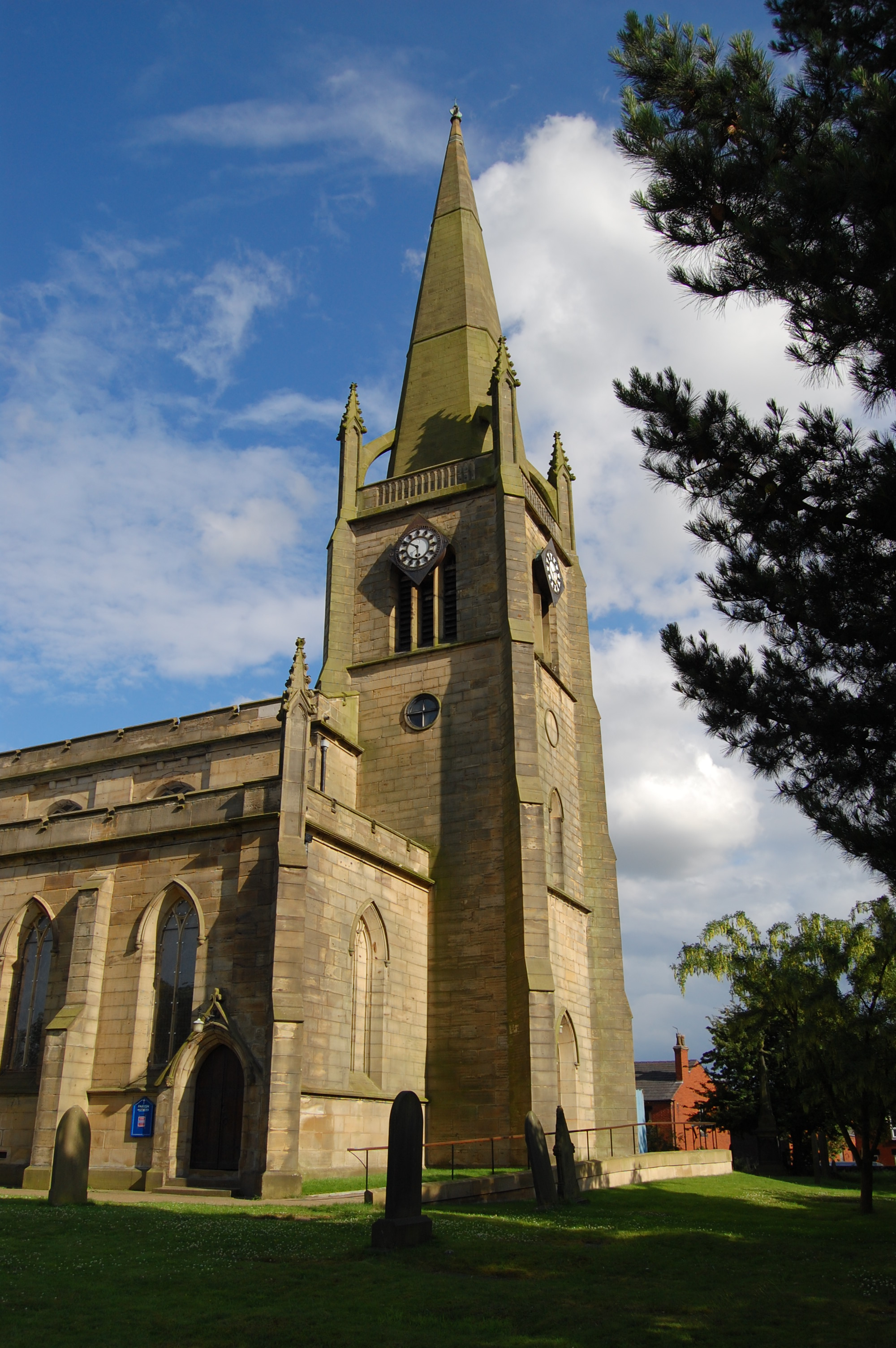
West end and spire of St George's Church

For many years Tyldesley's landscape was dominated by factory chimneys and pit headgear. Since the closure of the mines and demolition of the factories, St George's Church—one of the few structures in the town built of stone, with a spire rising to 150 feet (46 m) in height—and Top Chapel in the Market Square have become the chief landmarks; both are Grade II listed buildings. Tyldesley's built environment is almost uniformly constructed of brick.

Among the listed buildings in Tyldesley are Chaddock Hall and Damhouse, both Grade II listed. Chaddock Hall is a private residence and Damhouse or Astley Hall is a heritage centre having previously been used as the office block for Astley Hospital.

== Transport ==
Edward Entwistle, the driver of the first inter-city scheduled passenger train in the world, was born in Tyldesley in 1815. He drove the passenger service on the Liverpool to Manchester railway.

In 1861 the London and North Western Railway revived powers granted to the Lancashire and Yorkshire Railway to build a railway from Eccles to Wigan through the town. Tyldesley railway station was to the east of the junction of the branch to Kenyon Junction on the Liverpool to Manchester Line via Leigh and Pennington. The Earl of Ellesmere cut the first sod at Worsley on 11 September 1861 and the line opened to traffic on 1 September 1864. The Tyldesley Loopline closed on 3 May 1969 as a result of the Beeching Axe.

Elliott Street is part of Tyldesley's one-way system.

In 1900, a Bill authorising South Lancashire Tramways to construct more than 62 miles (100 km) of tramway in southern Lancashire was given Royal Assent. However, by November 1900 the South Lancashire Electric Traction and Power Company had acquired the shares. The first section of tramway opened on 20 October 1902 between Lowton and Four Lanes Ends via Leigh and Atherton and on 25 October 1902 a branch from Atherton to Tyldesley was opened and Tyldesley got its first tram. The company got into financial difficulty and in turn became Lancashire United Tramways later Lancashire United Transport. In August 1931 trams were replaced by trolley buses. Because of Tyldesley's narrow streets trams and trolley buses had to follow a one-way system; eastbound trams ran along Shuttle Street and Milk Street and westbound used Elliot Street and Castle Street, a system now used by all traffic. Tyldesley is connected to neighbouring towns by bus services operated by Diamond Bus North West of Atherton and First Greater Manchester.

The former trackbed of the Tyldesley Loopline route to the A580,within the Wigan MBC area was reserved in the Unitary Development Plan in case the rail route could be reinstated. A guided busway was built on the former trackbed but the proposal was not universally popular. After consultations work started on the 4.5-mile busway from Leigh to Ellenbrook in 2013. It has four stops, Cooling Lane, Astley Street, Hough Lane and Sale Lane and one of its three park and ride sites in Tyldesley. A pathway for walkers, cyclists and horse riders runs alongside it.

== Education ==
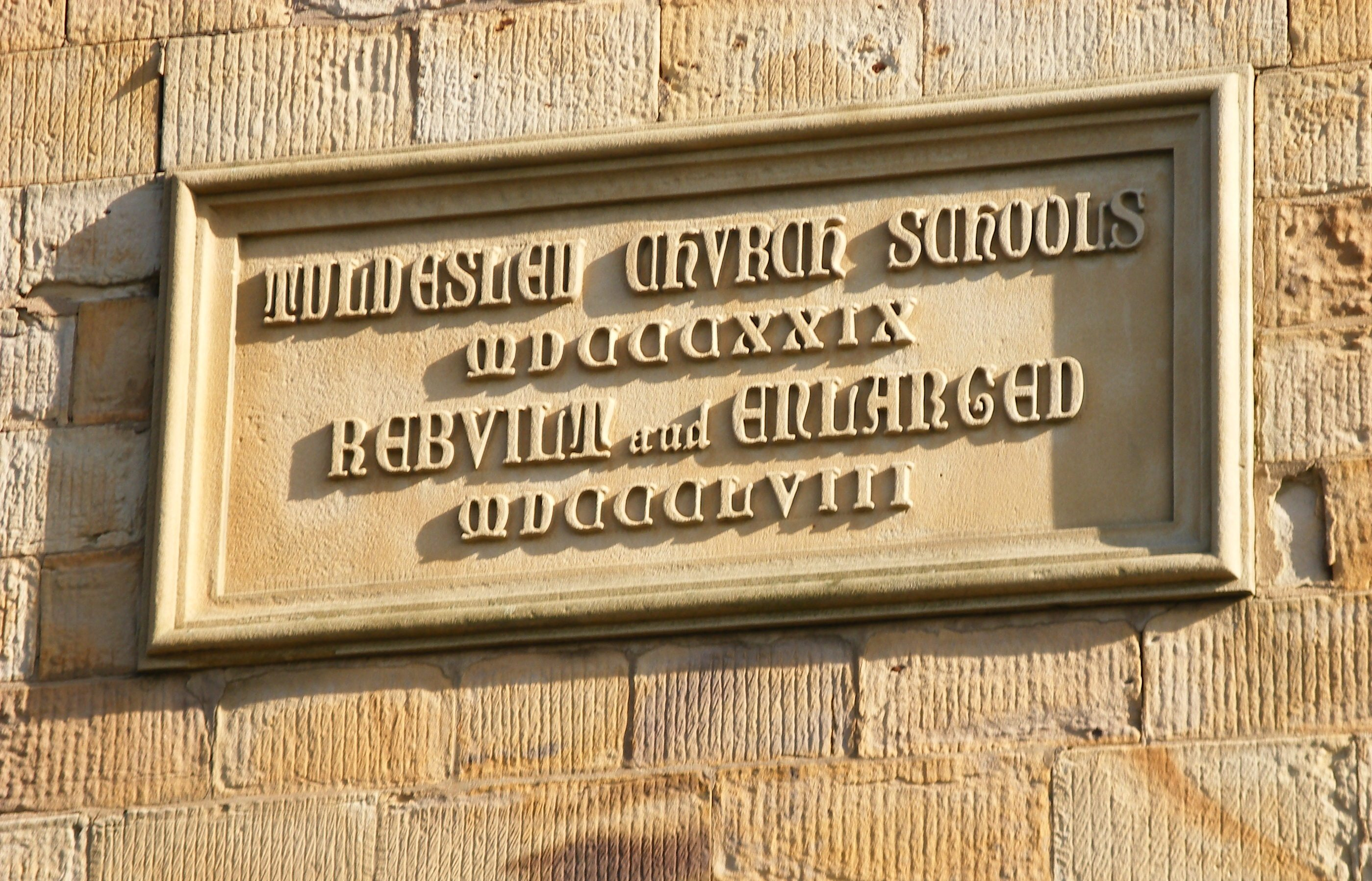
Plaque on the Old St George's School

George Ormerod gave a site for a national school near St George's Church, it catered for all age groups when it opened in 1827. A day school was opened in the old Wesley Chapel in 1856 and in 1864 was replaced by new school which lasted until 1912. A church school opened in Johnson Street in 1872 and closed the 1960s. The British School in Upper George Street opened in 1902. Its premises are now the Community Life Centre. The Mission School or Central C of E School in Darlington Street opened in 1892. A board school opened in Lower Elliott Street in 1913 which was used for girls' secondary education after 1935. Garrett Hall Boys' Secondary School opened in 1935.

St George's Central Primary School, built in the late 1990s is an amalgamation of the historical St George's C of E and Central C of E School. Other primary schools are Tyldesley Primary School and Garrett Hall Primary. Until 2007 there was a school in Shakerley but this has closed. Kingshill Special School occupying the old girls' secondary school, has closed.

The main school for secondary education in Tyldesley is Fred Longworth High School, which was awarded Arts College status in 1998. Children in Tyldesley also attend other high schools in the area including, St Mary's Catholic High School in Astley, the only Catholic high school and sixth form in the area.

Primary and secondary schools	Locality	Description	Website
St George's Central C.E. Primary	Tyldesley	Primary school	website
Tyldesley Primary	Tyldesley	Primary school	website
Garrett Hall Primary	Tyldesley	Primary school	website
St John's C.E. Primary Mosley Common	Mosley Common	Primary school	website
Tyldesley Fred Longworth High	Tyldesley	Secondary school	website
St Stephen's C.E. Primary Astley	Astley	Primary school	website
St Ambrose Barlow Catholic Primary	Astley	Primary school	website
St Mary's Catholic High Astley	Astley	Secondary school	website
Holy Family Roman Catholic Primary Boothstown	Boothstown	Primary school	website
Sacred Heart Roman Catholic Primary Hindsford Atherton	Atherton	Primary school	website
Hindsford C.E. Primary	Atherton	Primary school	website

== Religion ==
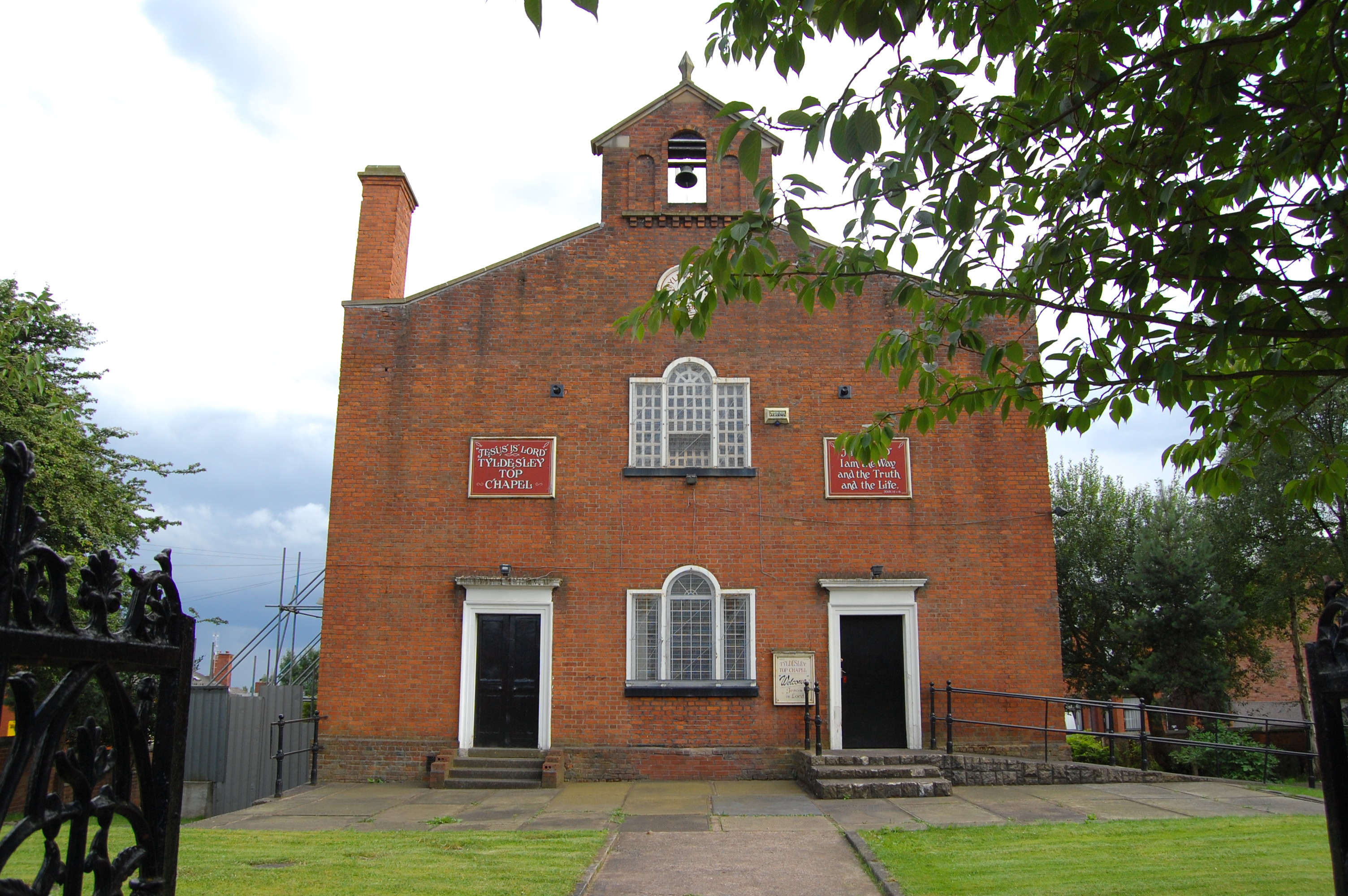
Tyldesley Top Chapel faces the Market Square

John Wesley preached in Shakerley four times, between 1748 and 1752, laying the foundations for a place of worship. In the 1780s George Whitfield who worked with Wesley early in his ministry also preached there. Tyldesley's first place of worship, Top Chapel was built in the Square in 1789 for the Countess of Huntingdon's Connexion which had broken from the Church of England. Thomas Johnson, gifted the site on the highest point of Tyldesley and Lady Huntingdon, a supporter of Wesley supplied money for building materials. The chapel became known as Top Chapel from its geographical location.

Before 1825 Tyldesley had no established church, and lay within the ancient parish of Leigh in the Diocese of Chester. The diocese divided in 1847, when the present Diocese of Manchester was created. For ritual baptisms, marriages and burials, the population, had to travel to churches outside of the township's boundaries, Leigh Parish Church or its daughter churches, Astley Chapel or Atherton Chapel or to Deane or Eccles.

The St George's Church a chapel of ease to Leigh, St Mary's, was built in 1825 on land donated by Thomas Johnson. It was a Commissioners' Church, paid for by money from the parliament of the United Kingdom raised by the Church Building Act 1818, said to be a celebration of Britain's victory in the Battle of Waterloo. Robert Smirke an official architect to the Office of Works, advised the Parliamentary Commissioners on the building of new churches from 1818 onwards, including St George's. The chapel was consecrated on 19 September 1825, dedicated to England's patron saint. The church could seat 1,100 people, it is 112 feet (34 m) in length, 60 feet (18 m) in width and its spire, a local landmark is 150 feet (46 m) in height. George Ormerod gave the land for the churchyard and also six bells which were cast at Downham Market.

Chapels were built for the Congregational, Primitive Methodist, Wesleyan Methodist, Baptist, Welsh Congregational, Welsh Calvinistic and Independent Methodist connexions. Welsh chapels served the Welsh people who migrated to the town after the opening of the railway in 1864.

== Sport ==
The idea for a public swimming baths came from millowner, Caleb Wright. The local board built the baths in Union Street at a cost of £1,300 (£130,000 in 2025) and they opened to great celebrations in 1876. Tyldesley Swimming Club was formed as soon as the baths opened. Two members of Tyldesley Swimming and Water Polo Club represented Great Britain in Olympic Games. Addin Tyldesley, competed in the 1908 Summer Olympics in London and Duncan Cleworth competed in the 1976 Summer Olympics in Montreal. The baths closed on health grounds in 1960 and the closed Majestic Cinema on Castle Street was converted into public baths in 1964. The pool is now the Pelican Centre.

Before the 1895 schism in English rugby, John Berry played rugby union for England, and Tyldesley FC which was founded in 1881. After the schism, the club was a founder member of the Northern Rugby Football Union (now Rugby league) and played for five seasons from 1895–96 to 1899–1900 finishing 6th of 22 in the initial combined league. The club rejoined the Rugby Football Union in 1911 playing at Well Street for many years before moving to St George's Park on Astley Street in November 2001. In 2008–09 season the 1st XV lost 8–7 to Cullompton in the Senior Vase Final at Twickenham.

== Culture ==
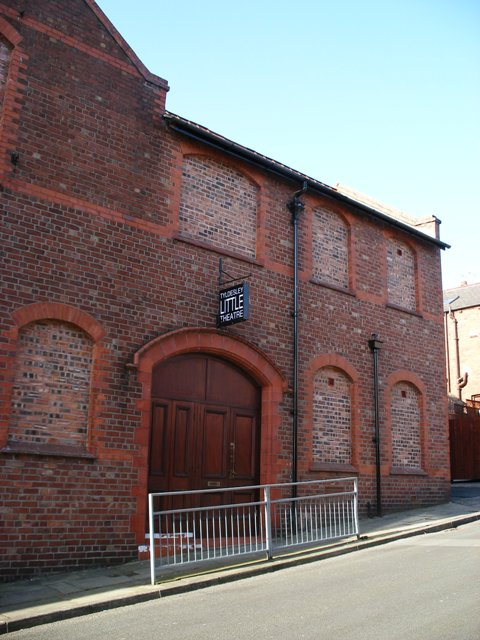
Tyldesley Little Theatre

Tyldesley's wealth as an industrial town resulted in outlets for the entertainment of its population, including cinemas and public houses. Films were shown in Tyldesley Miners' Hall from 1908. Three cinemas were built in the town, the Theatre Royal in John Street opened in 1909, the Carlton on Johnson Street in 1911, and the Majestic in Castle Street in 1923. In 1902 the council acquired land for a public park on Astley Street. A public library was built in 1908 with the aid of an Andrew Carnegie grant, on the site of the old Temperance Hall and Mechanics Institute on Stanley Street built in 1851.

Founded in 1877, Tyldesley Good Templars Band was the town's first brass band. Tyldesley Band is a member of the North West Brass Band Association and meets in the chapel on Milk Street. Tyldesley Little Theatre in Lemon Street is home to an amateur dramatic society, members of the Greater Manchester Drama Federation. The auditorium is a small 150-seat theatre with a traditional proscenium arch stage, stalls and balcony seating. The town's industrial landscape was recorded in the 1960s and 1970s in the paintings and prints of artist Roger Hampson. In March 2022, Tyldesley saw its 1st community radio station set up with the formation of Radio M29

== Public services ==
Tyldesley is policed by the Greater Manchester Police force from Atherton Police Station, which covers Atherton, Tyldesley, Astley and Mosley Common. The statutory emergency fire and rescue service is provided by the Greater Manchester Fire and Rescue Service, from Leigh and Atherton fire stations. Health services in the Wigan borough are provided by the Wigan Borough Clinical Commissioning Group. Hospital services are provided by the Wrightington, Wigan and Leigh NHS Foundation Trust, which provides an Accident and Emergency service at Wigan Hospital and outpatient clinics at Leigh Infirmary.

Waste management is co-ordinated by Wigan Metropolitan Council, which is a statutory waste disposal authority in its own right. Tyldesley's Distribution Network Operator for electricity is Electricity North West. United Utilities manage Tyldesley's drinking and waste water.

== Notable people ==
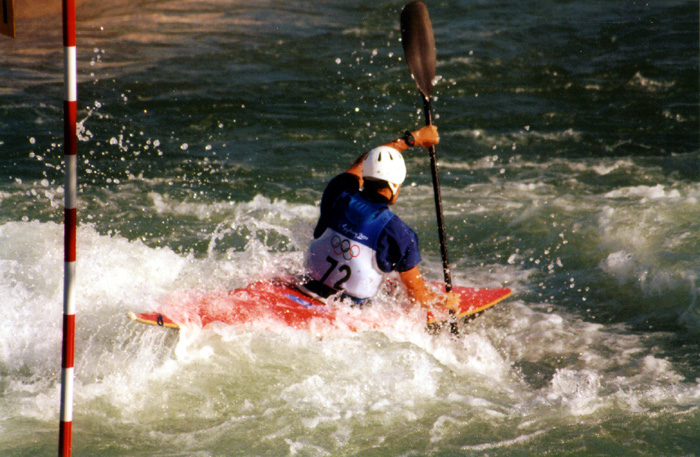
Paul Ratcliffe, 2000

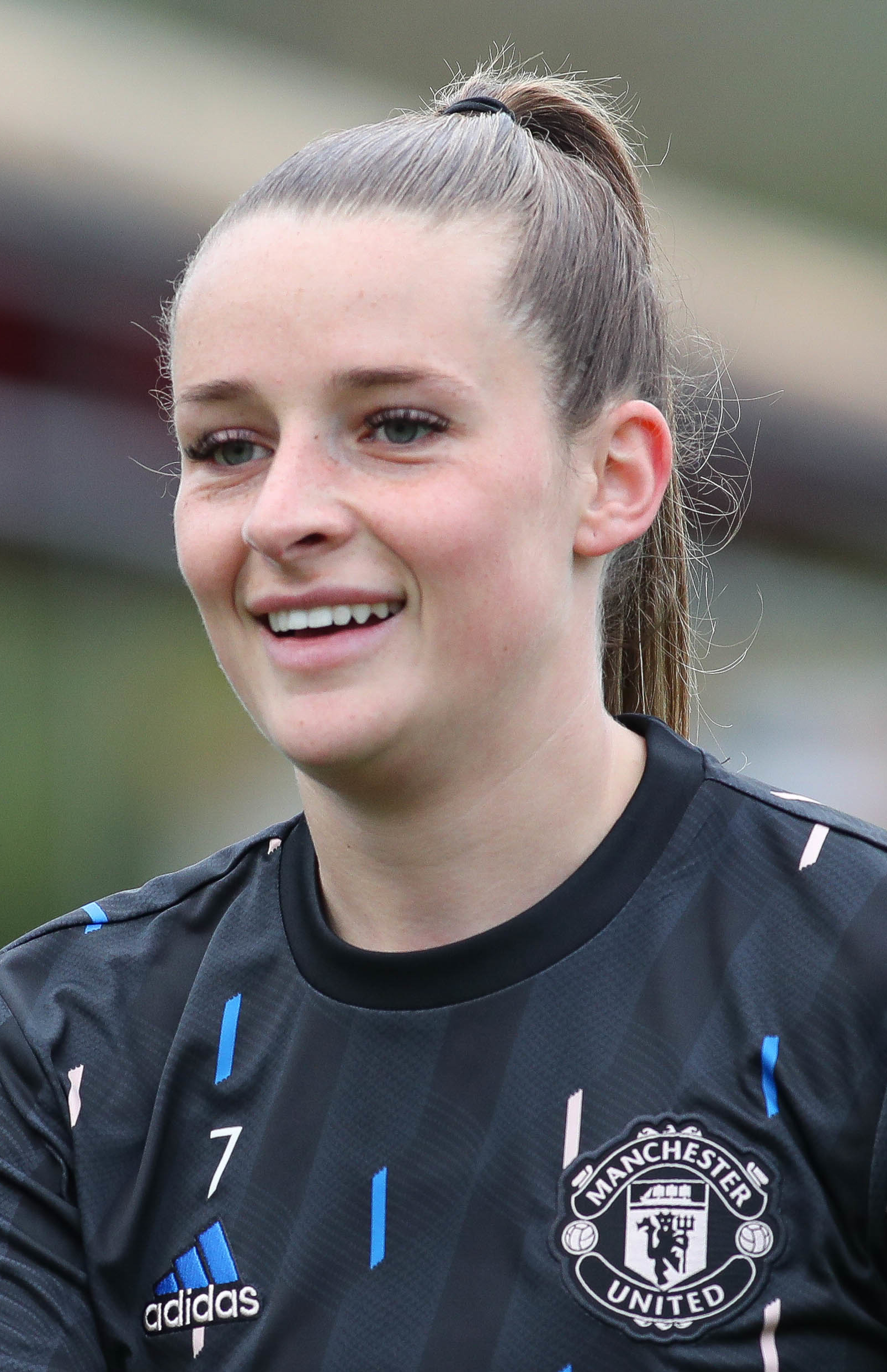
Ella Toone, 2023

- Thurstan Tyldesley (1495–1554), of Wardley Hall, a politician and MP for Lancashire 1547/1553.
- Henry Ratcliffe (1808–1877), actuary and friendly society administrator.
- Caleb Wright (1810–1898), mill owner and politician, MP for Leigh 1885/1895
- Edward Entwistle, (born 1815), the first driver of a passenger train on the Liverpool and Manchester Railway.
- Brian Runnett (1935–1970), organist and choral director; appointed organ scholar at St John's College, Cambridge, in 1960
- Garth Smith (born 1955), the original bassist of the locally formed punk rock band the Buzzcocks.

=== Sport ===
- Frederick Norris (1921–2006) Long-distance runner competed in the 1952 Helsinki and 1956 Melbourne Olympics.
- Lord James Blears (1923–2016), professional wrestler, actor, mariner and surfing personality.
- Wayne Foster (born 1963), footballer who played over 330 games starting with 105 for Bolton Wanderers
- Rob Speak (born 1972), a racing car driver in BriSCA Formula 2 Stock Cars
- Paul Ratcliffe (born 1973), slalom canoeist who won silver at the 2000 Summer Olympics
- Keely Hodginson (born 2002), Olympic runner, Silver Commonwealth Medal Winner
- Ella Toone (born 1999), footballer has played 150 games with Manchester United, and 68 for England

== See also ==
- List of collieries in Astley and Tyldesley
- List of mills in Wigan
- List of people from Wigan
- Listed buildings in Tyldesley
- List of mining disasters in Lancashire
