= Edward Entwistle =

Early English locomotive driver (1815–1909)

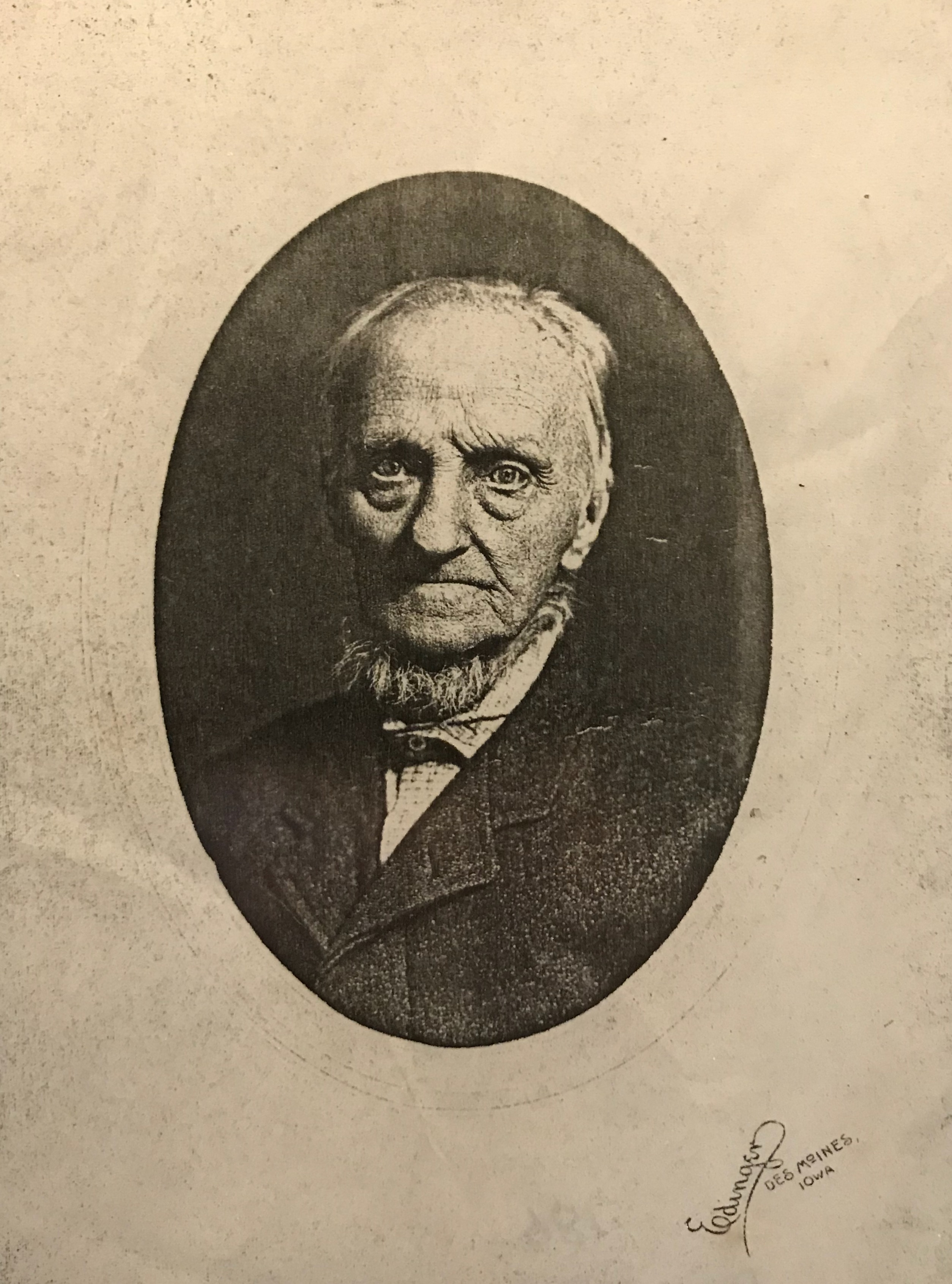
Edward Entwistle

Edward Entwistle, born 24 March 1815 in Tyldesley, Lancashire, was the first driver of a passenger train on the Liverpool and Manchester Railway. Apprenticed as an engineer at the age of 11, he worked at the Bridgewater Trust works, where the Rocket locomotive was under construction.

When the work was completed, George Stephenson requested an assistant and the 16-year-old Entwistle was on the footplate during the locomotive's first trials—eventually becoming its official driver when it began its twice daily service between Liverpool and Manchester. Entwistle later became a marine engineer and emigrated to the United States.

His death on 31 October 1909 in Des Moines, Iowa was reported in The Washington Post.
