= Tyldesley Town Hall =

Municipal building in Tyldesley, Greater Manchester, England

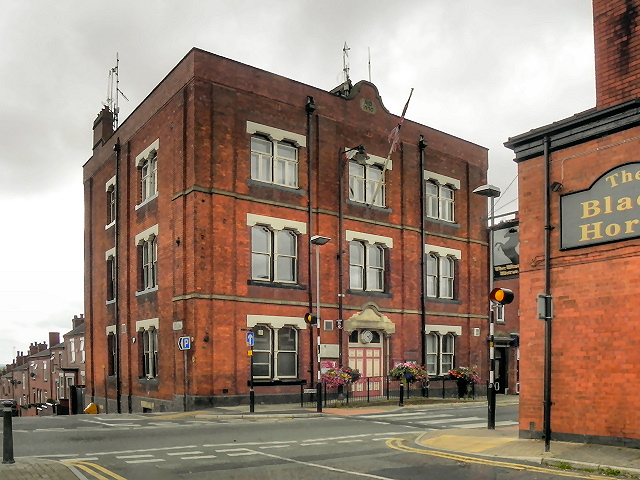
- Tyldesley Town Hall

- Shown in Greater Manchester
- 53.5140°N 2.4643°W
- Location: Elliott Street, Tyldesley

History
- Built: 1881

Site notes
- Architectural style: Victorian style

Tyldesley Town Hall is a municipal building in Elliott Street, Tyldesley, Greater Manchester, England. Initially the local Liberal Party Club, the town hall went on to become the meeting place of Tyldesley Urban District Council.

== History ==
In the late 19th century both the main political parties decided to establish clubs for their members in the town: the site the Liberal Party selected was open land at the corner of Elliott Street and Well Street, while the site the Conservative Party selected was open land on the corner of Shuttle Street and Stanley Street.

The Liberal Party building, which was designed in the Victorian style, was built in red brick and was officially opened by the local mill owner and future member of parliament, Caleb Wright, on 6 January 1881. The design involved a symmetrical main frontage with three bays facing onto Elliott Street; the central bay featured a doorway on the ground floor, there were mullion windows on the first and second floors and on all floors in the other bays. There was a date stone, displaying the year 1880, in the middle of the front elevation at roof level. Internally, the principal room was the main assembly hall.

Meanwhile, the local health board had established its offices in Lower Elliott Street, where it had also erected a fire station and a works depot; however, civic leaders decided that they needed more substantial premises after the area became an urban district in 1894. In line with the rise of the Labour Party and the decline of the Liberal Party across the country, local membership of the Liberal Club fell and the club got into financial difficulties. The local council decided to acquire the premises from the Liberal Club for £2,000 and converted it into a town hall in 1924. The council also acquired a fine portrait of Sir Thomas Tyldesley, a Royalist commander who served during the English Civil War, and arranged for it to be installed inside the building. King George VI and Queen Elizabeth drove past the waving crowds on the steps of the town hall on 18 May 1938.

The building continued to serve as a meeting place for Tyldesley Urban District Council for much of the 20th century but ceased to be the local seat of government after the enlarged Wigan Metropolitan Borough Council was formed in 1974. Since then, apart from being used as a venue for councillors' surgeries and as a closed-circuit television control centre for the town centre, the town hall remained vacant.

Following an announcement by English Heritage in September 2019, that Wigan Council would receive funding to create a Heritage Action Zone in Tyldesley, Wigan Council announced, in November 2019, a programme of improvement works to the town hall costing £1.5 million. The proposed works were intended to enable Tyldesley Library to relocate from its current aging premises in Stanley Street into the town hall, as well as to enable space to be created in the town hall for a café, a drop-in surgery and other facilities for community groups.
