= Tyldesley Top Chapel =

Building in Tyldesley, Greater Manchester, England

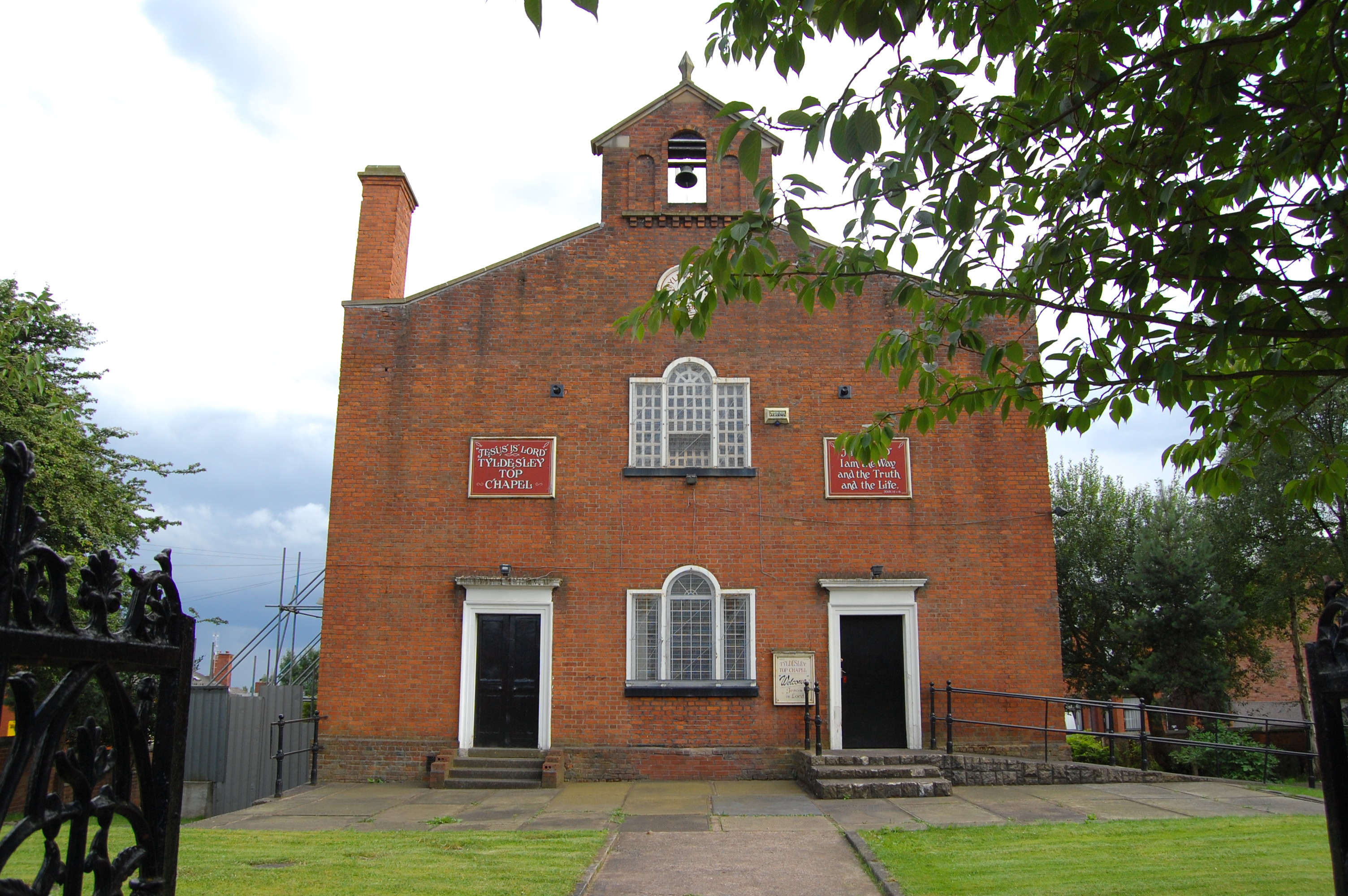
- The chapel has a gabled front and bellcote with a single bell.

- Location within Greater Manchester

Religion
- Affiliation: Countess of Huntingdon's Connexion now Pentecostal
- Year consecrated: 1789

Location
- Location: Tyldesley, England
- Interactive map of Tyldesley Top Chapel
- Coordinates: 53.5166°N 2.4668°W

Architecture
- Completed: 18th century
- Materials: Flemish bond brick

The Tyldesley Top Chapel (grid reference SD695019) is a chapel in Tyldesley. It is a Grade II Listed building.

Top Chapel was built in 1789 on a site of 1,300 square yards at the top of Tyldesley Banks opposite the Square. The site and building materials were all provided by Thomas Johnson. It was properly known as "The Lady Huntingdon Chapel" but became known as Top Chapel because of its position at the top of Astley Street. Its first minister was J. Johnson who was ordained at Spa Fields Chapel London by the Countess of Huntingdon's Connexion.

Lady Selina Hastings, the Countess of Huntingdon had been greatly influenced by John Wesley and George Whitefield and set up the Calvinistic Connexion within the Methodist Church. The Connexion still has several chapels, mostly in the south of England.

== Architecture ==
The chapel is constructed in Flemish bond brick. Its gabled facade is topped by a 19th-century bellcote with a single bell. A pair of panelled doors in moulded surrounds with flat hoods is separated by a Venetian style window with leaded glass. There is a similar window immediately above it and above that a roundel panel bearing the date. The side elevations have three bays, the centre bay is set slightly forward, all with round-headed windows. The rear has a gable pediment in brick relief and a blind window.

Inside, the three-sided gallery is supported on timber columns. The chapel has a plain ceiling, and 19th-century organ chamber.

== See also ==
- Listed buildings in Tyldesley
