= Isabel Benham =

American railroad finance expert

Isabel Hamilton Benham (August 4, 1909 – May 18, 2013) was born in Buffalo, NY and became an American railroad finance expert. A graduate of Bryn Mawr College in 1931, Isabel majored in economics, but received advice to follow a traditional path of marriage and the Junior League. In 1932, she finally landed a job with Reconstruction Finance Corporation, and in 1934 she joined RW Pressprich & Co as a statistician and finally became a partner in 1964. She focused on the railroad industry and worked on several merger while paying attention not only to the financial aspects, but actually riding the rails and looking over all the facilities and equipment. She was the first female partner at any Wall Street bond house.

Then, in 1968, as "one of the best known railroad specialists in Wall Street," she moved to the Wall Street firm of Shearson, Hammill & Co. as a first vice president. She wrote articles on railroad issues and supported "Open Access", the idea of separating railroad equipment from the railroad bed. Known as "Madam Railroad", she continued her expertise on railroads and served as a witness in Congressional hearings about railway laws and mergers.

After retiring, Isabel turned back to Bryn Mawr College: she funded renovations and improvements to the campus and a faculty research fund for early career support. She died at the age of 103.
