= Leigh Rural District =

Local government area in England, abolished 1974

Coordinates: 53°29′N 2°27′W

Leigh Rural District was, from 1894 to 1933, a rural district of the administrative county of Lancashire, in northwest England. It spanned a rural area outlying from the town Leigh.

It was created based on the rural sanitary district and consisted of the civil parishes of Astley, Culcheth, Kenyon and Lowton. The district was abolished in 1933 under a County Review Order. The parishes of Kenyon, Lowton and part of Culcheth went to the Golborne urban district, Astley was added to Tyldesley Urban District, and the remainder of Culcheth parish became part of the parish of Croft in Warrington Rural District.

Since 1974 the parishes of Croft and Culcheth and Glazebury form part of the borough of Warrington and the rest are part of the Metropolitan Borough of Wigan.
