= Mosley Common =

Coordinates: 53.5098°N 2.4304°W

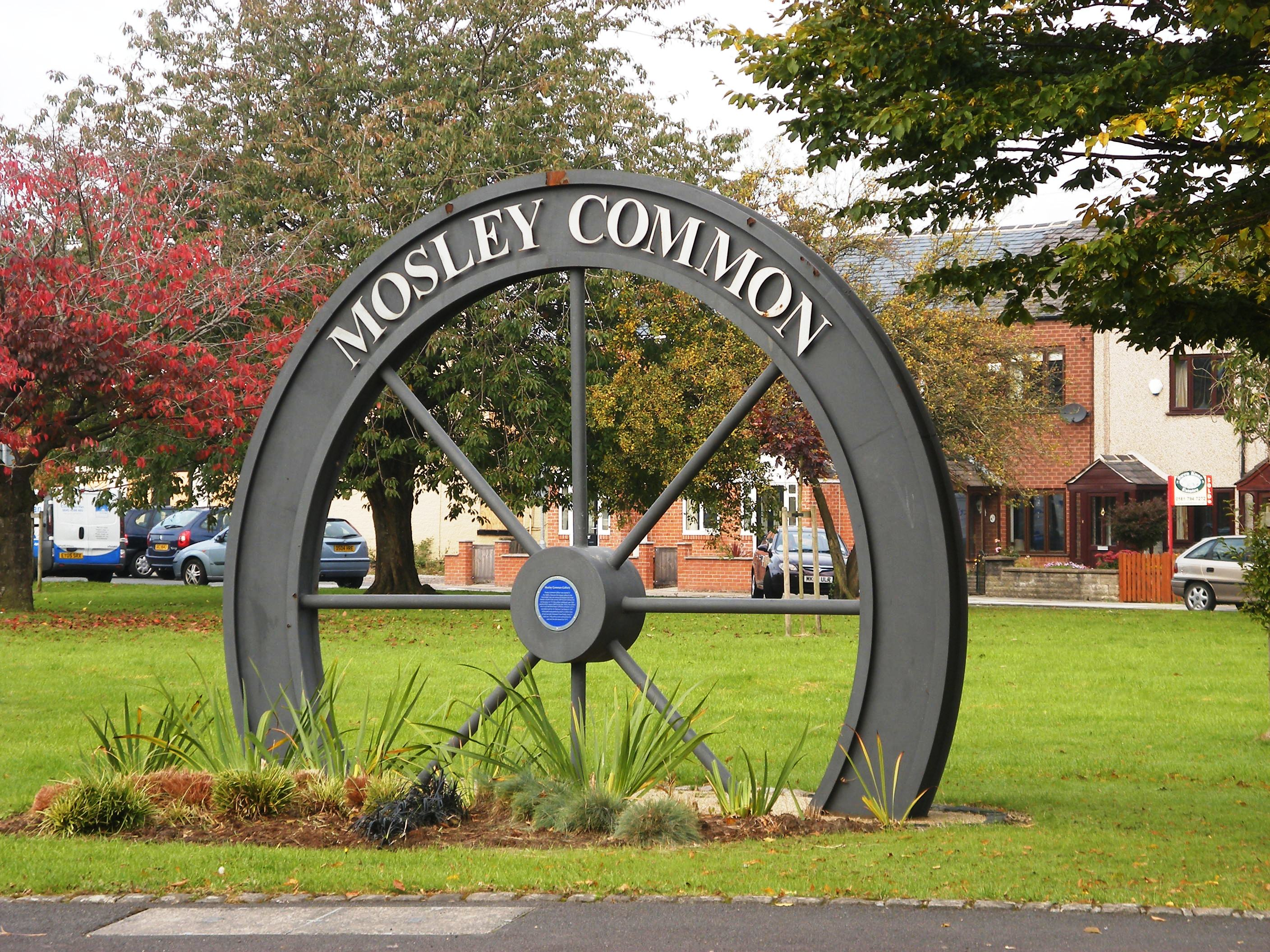
- Mosley Common village sign

- Location within Greater Manchester
- OS grid reference: SD715015
- Metropolitan borough: Wigan
- Metropolitan county: Greater Manchester
- Region: North West
- Country: England
- Sovereign state: United Kingdom
- Post town: MANCHESTER
- Postcode district: M28, M29
- Dialling code: 01942/0161
- Police: Greater Manchester
- Fire: Greater Manchester
- Ambulance: North West
- UK Parliament: Worsley and Eccles

Mosley Common is a suburb of Tyldesley at the far-eastern edge of the Metropolitan Borough of Wigan, in Greater Manchester, England. Historically part of Lancashire, it was anciently a hamlet in the east of the township of Tyldesley cum Shakerley, in the ancient parish of Leigh. The area of Mosley Common in 1747 was 34 acres (14 ha).

== History ==
The original name for the area was Hurst or Tyldesleyhurst (hyrst is Old English for "wooded hill") It was called Mosseld Yard in 1301. Mosley the clearing on mossy ground. In 1695 the Common was part of the Tyldesley Manor. In 1698 Parr Bridge or Mosley Bridge was rebuilt in stone.

=== Industry ===
In 1831 R. Worthington of Mosley Common built a weaving shed with 60 pairs of looms. Parr Bridge Mill, built in 1859, was a weaving shed; it had several owners and continued working into the 1950s.

In 1838 City Pit and Gatley Pit, owned by the Bridgewater Trustees at New Manchester not far from the border with Worsley, were working, New Manchester, not far from Ellenbrook, is sometimes referred to as the "City". Deep mining arrived in the area when Mosley Common Colliery, owned by the Bridgewater Trustees, was sunk in the 1860s. In 1896, Mosley Common "Nos. 1, 2 & 5" pits employed 748 men underground and 85 surface workers. Coal was mined from the Brassey, Crumbouke and Seven Foot mines. "Nos. 3 & 4" pits employed a further 406 underground workers and 57 above ground. Coal was got from the Trencherbone mine. By 1919 it employed over 2,000 men. It was part of Manchester Collieries from 1929 to nationalisation in 1947 and was a national show pit during the 1950s. Mosley Common closed in 1968.

== Governance ==
Today Astley and Mosley Common form an electoral ward of the Metropolitan Borough of Wigan. The ward elects three councillors to the 75-member metropolitan borough council, Wigan's local authority. As of 2009, the three ward councillors for Astley and Mosley Common are one Conservative, one Labour and one Independent.

Following a review of parliamentary representation in Greater Manchester, the Boundary Commission recommended that Mosley Common should be part of the Worsley and Eccles constituency at the next general election.

== Education ==
In 1822 a Sunday school was built at Mosley Common. It was enlarged in 1881 and was used for religious services before the church was built.

School	Locality	Description	Website
St. John's C.E. Primary Mosley Common	Mosley Common	Primary school	website
Holy Family R.C. Primary	Mosley Common	Primary	website

== Religion ==
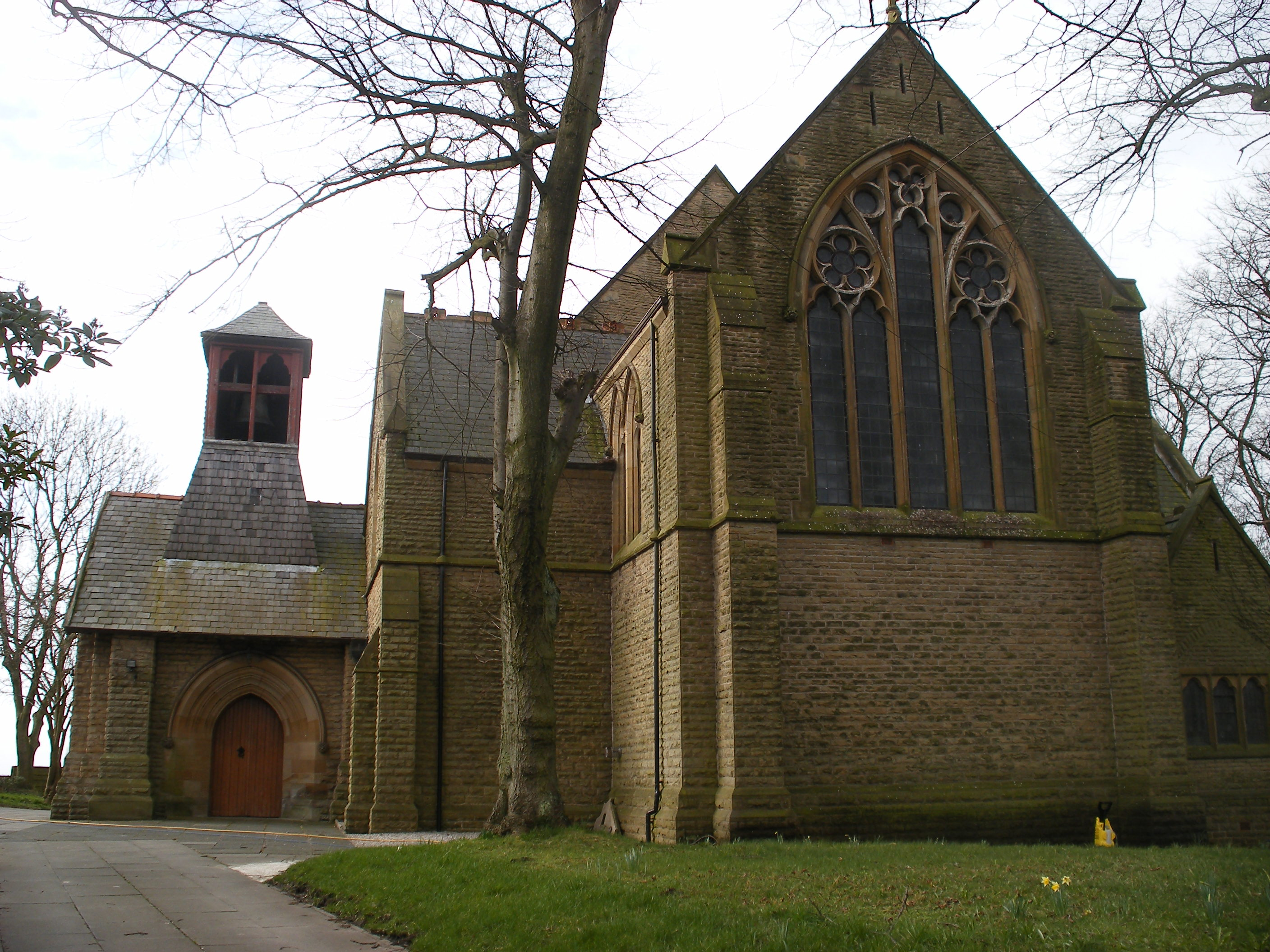
St John's Mosley Common

In 1838 the Primitive Methodists rented a cottage to use for worship, it was referred to as the "Ranter's Chapel". It was replaced by a chapel in 1868.

In 1885 the Countess of Ellesmere laid the foundation stone for St John the Evangelist Church, it cost £4,250. It was a daughter church of St George's Church, Tyldesley. Church services were previously held in the school.

== See also ==
- List of Collieries in Astley and Tyldesley
