= The Churchill Machine Tool Company =

British engineering company

The Churchill Machine Tool Company Limited
- Type: Machine Tool Manufacturer
- Industry: Engineering
- Predecessor: None
- Founded: 1901; separate company from 1906
- Founder: Charles Churchill
- Fate: Taken over, liquidated, name re-used
- Successor: Alfred Herbert
- Headquarters: Manchester, lastly Coventry, England
- Number of locations: Factories in Manchester & later Coventry, England; various sales offices/agencies
- Area served: Worldwide
- Key people: Charles Churchill, H. H. Asbridge, Sir Greville Maginness
- Products: Machine tools
- Parent: Charles Churchill & Co Ltd, then BSA and lastly Alfred Herbert
- Website: www.churchillmachinetools.co.uk/about-us/

The Churchill Machine Tool Company Limited began as the manufacturing subsidiary of the machine tool importers Charles Churchill & Company Limited founded in the early 1900s by US-born Charles Churchill (1837–1916). Created out of the personal bankruptcy of Charles Churchill, the company developed to become one of the largest British importers of machine tools from the United States and a major manufacturer of such tools, initially under licence and later of its own development.

The original business importing American machine tools into Britain began with Charles Churchill as sole proprietor and later as a partnership with two others. It became a limited company in 1889. In 1906 a separate company, The Churchill Machine Tool Co Ltd, was established with the purpose of adapting tools imported by Charles Churchill & Co. The former expanded, producing American tools under licence and then manufactured tools of its own design, in particular precision surface grinders and similar engineering machinery. In 1918 The Churchill Machine Tool Co relocated its factories onto a single site at Broadheath, near Altrincham.

The two companies initially remained closely linked, with common a chairman and board members, including Arthur Chamberlain. In the early 1930s a series of board disagreements within Charles Churchill & Co led to Arthur Chamberlain resigning as chairman of that company. He remained chairman of The Churchill Machine Tool Co, and the two companies diverged. Charles Churchill & Co changed from a sales organisation to become a manufacturer. Thereafter, both companies manufactured machine tooling, and Charles Churchill & Co became a group of companies. By the 1960s significant rationalisation took place in British manufacturing, with companies merging or being taken over in an attempt to achieve benefits from economies of scale and pooled resources. The Churchill Machine Tool Co was taken over by the Birmingham Small Arms Company, which merged with Alfred Herbert Ltd, with production moving to Coventry. Coincidentally, Charles Churchill & Co was taken over by Tube Investments (TI).

The Churchill Machine Tool Co ceased trading in the early 1970s along with several other companies in the Alfred Herbert group, during a period of huge contraction of the manufacturing sector in Britain's economy. A part of the Charles Churchill & Co group became Matrix Churchill through a convoluted corporate process.

A company using The Churchill Machine Tool Co name still trades; but Charles Churchill & Co no longer exists.

== History ==
=== Charles Churchill ===
Charles Churchill was born in the United States, in Hamden, Connecticut, on 8 July 1837. His father was Willis Churchill, described as "a mechanic of rare ability, original in the style of his goods and in his process of manufacture," who had been manufacturing brass surgical instruments at a time when such instruments were all imported to the United States. Willis Churchill founded a factory manufacturing auger drill bits which was so locally prominent that the area of Hamden in which it was situated was called Augerville.

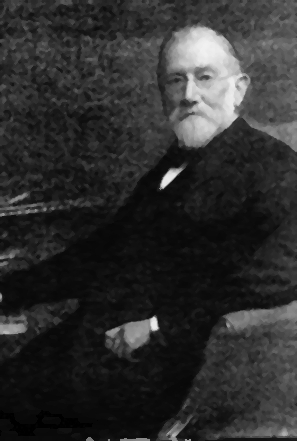
Charles Churchill, 1837–1916

Charles worked in his father's auger manufacturing business, but when Willis went to London in 1861 to supervise the installation of wire-covering machinery being exported by Thompson, Langdon & Co of New York City, Charles soon followed and, once there, spotted a business opportunity for himself as he saw the interest that the US-made equipment generated. By the time of his death his businesses had a presence in London, Manchester, Glasgow, Birmingham and Newcastle-on-Tyne and was "a giant machine-importing business".

According to historian L. T. C. Rolt, the original installation was of machines for wire-braiding crinoline frames, and Charles simultaneously imported metal cutting machine tools to aid his friend Hiram Maxim who was developing a machine gun. This is a moot point: the Maxim gun was not developed for a further 20 years, and it is unlikely that Maxim was in England during the 1860s; however, the Gatling gun was patented in 1862. Rolt claimed that Charles Churchill & Co began trading in 1865 as importers of engineering tools and is thought to have imported the first examples of Morse tapered twist drills, self-centring drill chucks (manufactured by Cushman) and hand-held micrometers into the UK. According to Floud, he imported agricultural implements and other non-engineering items at this time. In its early years the company traded from 28 Wilson Street, Finsbury: sales catalogues were published certainly between 1876 and 1882 stating this address.

Charles Churchill & Co initially operated on Charles' own account rather than as a limited company. In his early period of operating in England he was active in patenting engineered items in conjunction with one of several other parties. The London Gazette shows several announcements for protection under the terms of the Patent Law Amendment Act 1852 (see table below). Two of them were subsequently announced as voided by reason of non-payment for continuance. (To continue required that the applicant pay a stamp duty of £50 within three years subsequent to the application.)

Summary of patent applications involving Charles Churchill announced in The London Gazette
App. No.	App. date	For	First named	Second named	Voided
859	25 Mar 1865	Improvements in oil feeders or cans	James Buckingham	Charles Churchill	26 Mar 1868
2783	27 Oct 1865	Improvements in screw wrenches	James Buckingham	Charles Churchill	
2782	27 Oct 1865	Improvements in lathe chucks	James Buckingham	Charles Churchill	28 Oct 1868
2899	6 Nov 1866	An improved chuck for holding drills and other tools	Charles Churchill	Albert Beach	
3696	27 Dec 1867	An improved gas-burner	Charles Churchill	Willis Churchill	
3173	15 Oct 1868	Improvements in sporting breech-loading fire-arms and cartridges for the same	Charles Churchill	William H Miller	
2018	2 Jul 1869	An improved implement for drawing nails	Charles Churchill	Willis Churchill	
1361	10 May 1870	An improved window-fastener	Charles Churchill	William L Clark	
4309	14 Dec 1874	Improvements in knitting machinery	Charles Churchill	Eli Tiffany	
218	18 Jan 1876	An improved locking-washer for securing screw bolts and nuts	Charles Churchill	Sanford Elton Gee	

Churchill's location is stated as being New York City for the 1865 applications (Buckingham was at Westmoreland House, Walworth Common, Surrey); for those of 1867 and 1868 he was in Norwood, Surrey, and states himself to be a merchant; still listing himself as a merchant, the 1869–70 applications show his summarised address as Darnley Crescent, Hackney, Middlesex; and thereafter as a merchant at Wilson Street, Finsbury. Willis Churchill, Clark and Gee were all shown as being of New York City; Tiffany was of Bennington, Vermont; Miller was of West Meriden, Connecticut; and Beach of Newark, New Jersey.

Charles Churchill, then living at 118 Cazenove Road, Stoke Newington, Middlesex, with offices at 21 Cross Street, Finsbury, trading as Charles Churchill & Co, was declared bankrupt by debtors' petition on 1 September 1887. He declared himself bankrupt rather than be declared so by someone to whom he owed money. The final dividend in bankruptcy was paid in 1889, and he was released from trusteeship on 29 April 1890. He had applied earlier for discharge but it had been refused on the grounds that he

had omitted to keep such books of account as are usual and proper in the business carried on by him, and as sufficiently disclose his business transactions and financial position within three years immediately preceding his bankruptcy; had continued to trade after knowing himself to be insolvent; and had brought on his bankruptcy by rash and hazardous speculations.

Churchill fully tooled-up—that is, installed, assembled and made ready for productive use—the Gatling Gun factory that opened in Birmingham in 1889. This was despite being an undischarged bankrupt. He had formed a partnership with his son, Charles Henry Churchill, and in 1888 he obtained another partner when John William Wright Gabriel disposed of his family's interest in a drugs manufacturer, Gabriel and Troke, and joined the Churchills. This partnership may explain how he was able to complete the work in Birmingham despite his financial status. Despite the assertion by biographer David Jeremy that J W W Gabriel disposed of the drugs manufacturing interest, a notice in The London Gazette for 1885 shows his father, John Wild Gabriel, ending a partnership with Troke, and that Troke then formed a similar arrangement with another person.

=== Early years as a limited company ===
In 1889 the partnership was transformed into a limited company, Charles Churchill & Co Ltd (company registration number 29931). There followed a period of exceptional growth, and in 1896 a dividend of 230% was paid on the company's share capital of £5,500.

In an interview in the US towards the end of 1896 Churchill explained that for the financial year ending 1 September 1896 sales were £110,000, and the order book value was £30,000. He attributed much of the exceptional growth of that year to the boom in bicycling and the consequent demand for automatic screw machines and similar machinery, and commented that he had placed orders for between 15 million and 18 million steel balls and that gas furnaces were selling well. He explained that there was little competition for the imported machinery – not even a manufacturer of chucks, as far as he was aware – because "English" firms seemed reluctant to even copy US designs, partly because of "the Englishman's desire to have and to embody his own ideas" and to what they perceived to be the high capital costs of setting up production given the price at which US machinery was sold there. A few years later he did just that.

He commented in 1901 that what he called the "hump", caused by the bicycling bubble, needed to be put into context: growth in the trade had been steady for the company both before and since that time.

This period of British-US engineering development has been the subject of analysis by economic historians. S B Saul, writing in 1960, determined that British engineering and its methods were advanced in spheres such as the manufacture of textile machinery but less so in that of light machine tools and the machinery of mass production. He argued that in these areas the response by British manufacturers to imports from the US "belatedly matured so their influence permeated back through the whole engineering trade and began a rejuvenation of old fossilised trades" in the 1890s. He broadly agreed with the contemporary opinion of Churchill that the adoption of US methods was slow in the light machine tools sector primarily because there was a perceived lack of demand and return on investment to excite the interest of British engineers. He viewed the cycle boom as the catalyst for growth in this area but pointed out that the heavy machine tool sector was one of those which had not been previously neglected by British engineers.

Economic historian Roderick Floud's analysis, in the 1970s, of relative imports and exports led him to the conclusion that it was "unlikely that the American share of the British market was rising significantly, until the 1890s ... [it rose to] a peak in 1899 before settling back to a period of less astonishing but still considerable growth to 1913." He also advanced a hypothesis, believing Saul's analysis to be "simplified", which placed a heavier emphasis on happenings in the US than in Britain: that the US import tariff of 45% on machinery and engineered products, which was the highest in the world until 1908, protected the development of the US industry in such products while it reached a maturity which enabled its prices to fall to a level that was highly competitive in the world market.

In March 1897 Charles Churchill & Co Ltd was put into voluntary liquidation to aid capital restructuring. This comprised an increase in authorised share capital to £50,000: £30,000 was fully subscribed, £10,000 allotted as goodwill for the old company and £10,000 retained for later issue. Within two years the company advertised with contact addresses at 2 – 10 Albert Street in Birmingham, 5 Cross Street in Manchester and 52 Bothwell Street, Glasgow, and its main office at 9 – 15 Leonard Street, Finsbury. By 1902 advertisements show the Manchester address as 2 Charlotte Street, Mosley Street and an additional office had opened at Albion Buildings, St James' Street, Newcastle. There were more than 30 employees at the London premises and 8 or 9 in Birmingham.

The capital restructuring also saw the addition of Herbert Chamberlain, brother of Joseph Chamberlain, to the board of directors. He was well connected in business terms as well as politically, having interests in Birmingham Small Arms Company (BSA) among other things. BSA had moved into producing bicycles and components after the end of the Crimean War, a product line it had an interest in before that event. Other members of the Chamberlain family were later involved in the company.

The new main office in Leonard Street opened around 1896 and comprised 12,474 square feet (1,159 m^{2}) over four storeys, complete with internal hydraulic lifts, an external hydraulic crane and electric lighting; the company claimed in its press release that it had more than doubled its sales compared to any previous year and that it had sales lists for in excess of 100 US machinery manufacturers.

Examples of the agency agreements in place can be found from in the American Machinist of June 1897. They include: the Hamilton Machine Tool Company of Ohio (who were advertising a 16" sliding head drill); Baker Bros of Toledo, Ohio (advertising a combined sprocket turning and boring machine); Flather & Co, Nashua, N.H. (lathes); Warner & Swasey, Cleveland, Ohio (turret engine lathes); Chas. A. Strelinger & Co, Detroit (grinding and polishing machinery and pull countershafts by Builders' Iron Foundry, Providence, R.I.); and American Gas Furnace Co, New York (oil gas plants, gas blast furnaces and high pressure blowers). He had much to say about the correct manner of packing all of this equipment.

The American Machinist not only provided information on Churchill's business activities but in January 1901 announced he (and his wife and daughter) had returned to London after a visit to the US which was not for business but rather to see his ageing mother.

In 1907 the company was seeking to wind up the Aston Cantlow Mill Ball and Bearing Company Ltd. Indeed, that company was wound up on 17 January 1908, although the reasons for this are unclear. Charles Henry Prideaux was appointed to represent the company on the liquidation committee for Leitner Electrical Company Ltd in 1915.

=== Expansion ===
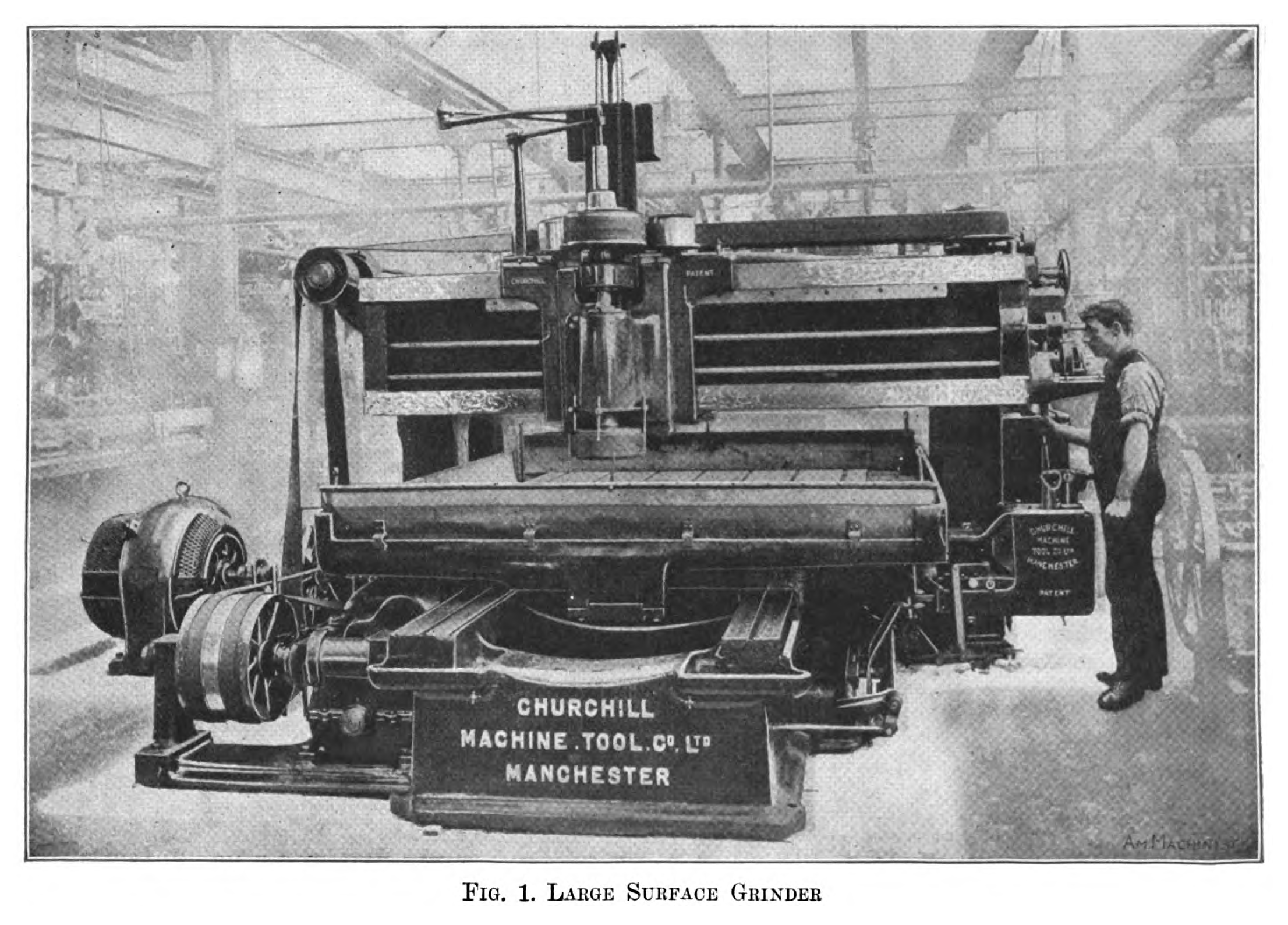
Large surface grinder built by The Churchill Machine Tool Co at Pendleton, 1913

In 1901 Churchill bought a factory in Griffin Court, Chapel Street, Salford, initially as a facility to tool up the imported machinery. It was not the first British company to do this, as Sharp, Stewart & Co had built American machinery under license since at least 1873.

As business improved in 1904 the enterprise moved to larger premises in Pendleton, where an annual rent of £90 was payable. On 1 January 1906, this operation became a limited company, The Churchill Machine Tool Co, with an authorised share capital of £50,000, split as £20,000 in ordinary shares of £1 and £30,000 in £5 preference shares. To accomplish the transfer of manufacturing operations, Charles Churchill & Co sold the Pendleton business to the new company for £15,000, of which £7,500 was in cash and a similar amount in £1 ordinary shares. The directors were Charles Churchill, J W W Gabriel, Walter Chamberlain and C H Churchill. Herbert Chamberlain had died in 1904.

In 1904 Charles Churchill & Co was engaged in an unusual commission. The Royal Navy's HMS Bellerophon was one of three ships being converted to serve at Devonport as floating workshops for the training of 200 or so engine-room artificers involving the removal of the conning tower and the deck roofed-in to form a workshop area. Bellerophon was renamed Indus III, and Churchill supplied some of her workshop equipment.

The Glasgow office address changed between February 1905 and March 1906 to 9 Wellington Street.

By June 1906 there were nearly 200 machine tools under construction at the factory, and in 1907 around £5,000 was spent on enlarging the premises, although a year-on-year drop in sales of 36% in 1908 demonstrated that all was not a smooth progression. Dividends had to be suspended for that year but were resumed in 1909.

By this time the company manufactured machine tools to its own design. Rapid expansion in the use of precision grinding machines after 1910, particularly in the developing car manufacturing industry, focussed the company's efforts on producing machines of this type. Many were of a revolutionary design due to the technical flair of Harry Hales Asbridge, who had joined the company from Charles Churchill & Co at its inception. A large plain grinding machine, with a 50-inch (130 cm) swing, built and installed in Sheffield, remained in service at least until the 1990s and was used primarily to grind the journals of large crankshafts.

Slater's Manchester, Salford & Suburban Directory of 1911 listed Charles Churchill & Co Ltd (manager Sydney H March) at 6 Oxford Street and 7 Lower Mosley Street, as "engineers and importers of American machinery and tools"; and also The Churchill Machine Tool Co Ltd as "engineers and manufacturers of machine and small tools" at 107 Frederick Road, Pendleton, the address of Charles Churchill & Co's works. The details were the same in the 1909 edition. Despite this, the register of members for the Institution of Mechanical Engineers in every year between 1902 and 1915 shows Sydney Herbert March (AMIMechE, 1901, MIMechE, 1912) as being c/o Messrs Charles Churchill & Co, 2 Charlotte Street, Mosley Street, Manchester, and only from 1916 is he shown at the Oxford Street address referred to by Slater in 1909 and 1911.

As growth continued The Churchill Machine Tool Co's share capital was increased to £70,000, and in 1911 the four directors, who had not drawn a salary since its inception, were voted £25 each as remuneration. By 1913 the businesses had attained such a position with in-house manufacturing of grinding machinery that Charles Churchill was able to ignore a threat to withdraw from him, on the grounds of conflict of interest, the agency agreement with US company Brown & Sharpe which had been set up in 1872 before his bankruptcy.

The 1915 Post Office Directory for London listed Charles Churchill & Co Ltd trading from 9 – 15 Leonard Street EC (Finsbury) in various categories: under "Emery Wheel and Machinery Makers" as agents for Norton & Co of Worcester, Massachusetts; under "Engineers' Machine Tool Makers", "Merchants – American", "Merchants – General", "Toolmakers and Dealers" and under "Machinery Merchants". The address was shared with Carson James & Co Ltd, machine toolmakers, and The Churchill Machine Tool Co Ltd was also listed. The 1914 edition of the publication states Norton & Co was involved in "alundum and crystolon grinding wheels"; its appointment of Churchill as agents took place in 1910. In 1921, there was a US patent application for a lathe assigned to Churchill directors and in which James Carson living in London was cited as the inventor.

Charles Churchill suffered ill-health in his later years and retired from active involvement in the companies in 1915. His son, Charles Henry Churchill, assumed the responsibilities of chairman and managing director. Charles Churchill died on 14 or 15 February 1916; his last address was 321 Seven Sisters Road, Stoke Newington, London. His son, C H Churchill, had died six days earlier. W Chamberlain was appointed chairman, and Arthur Lyman Churchill, son of Charles, stepped up from head of the small tool grinding department to become managing director and, in 1920, chairman. Willis Clark Churchill, brother of Arthur, became a board member after 30 years of association with the business but died before the end of the war.

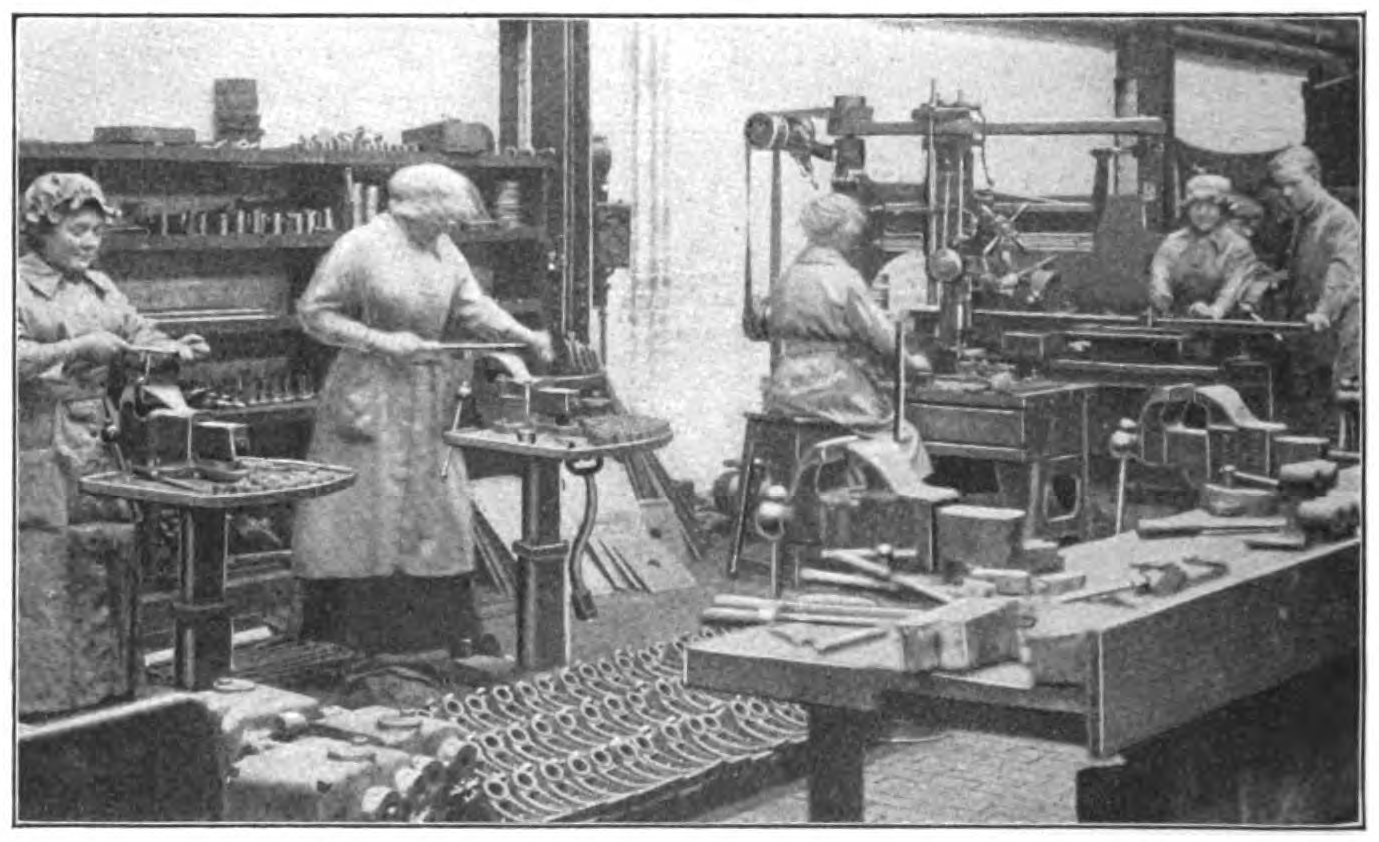
Women during wartime: standing in for the depleted male workforce at Churchill's Pendleton factory, 1916

Demand for grinding machinery and specialist knowledge in the heat treatment of metals and other areas the company had developed was so high during the years of World War I that the government ordered other British manufacturers to produce Churchill designs. One specialist area was heat-treated blades used to cut the cables of sea mines. In April 1916 an increase in share capital to expand the factory further was authorised. During the war years the company was misled by a trade union such that it paid its male fitters, who were supervising female war workers, an increased wage of 48 shillings per week. The union told the company it was the rate paid for similar work at Armstrong Whitworth, when it was not.

A news item in an edition of American Machinist of that year suggests that the Churchill name had a certain cachet in the US, as it warned that:

An imposter using the name 'Morris' has been falsely representing himself in this country as a representative of Charles Churchill & Co., London, England. His chief purpose has been to raise money under many of the guises to which such imposters usually resort. He judges his prospective victims and varies his story accordingly, Forewarned is forearmed.

The Churchill Machine Tool Co was a founder member of Associated British Machine Tool Makers Ltd (ABMTM) in 1917, an organisation that might be classed as a cartel but which was then perfectly. It was a joint-venture marketing company to develop export markets. Charles Churchill & Co continued to handle domestic sales. A further note of inter-company co-operation was informal Saturday afternoon exchange visits between local machine shops to aid the exchange of ideas and appreciate differences in development and working practice which lasted for a few years before 1923. Companies involved in this included Churchill, Mather & Platt, Hans Renold, John Hetherington, B & S Massey, British Westinghouse and Browett, Lindley & Co of Patricroft. In January 1919, Charles Churchill & Co bought a one-third share in Cornelius Redman & Sons Co Ltd, planer and lathe-makers at Pioneer Works between Parkinson Lane and Warley Road in Halifax, Yorkshire.

=== Fallow years ===
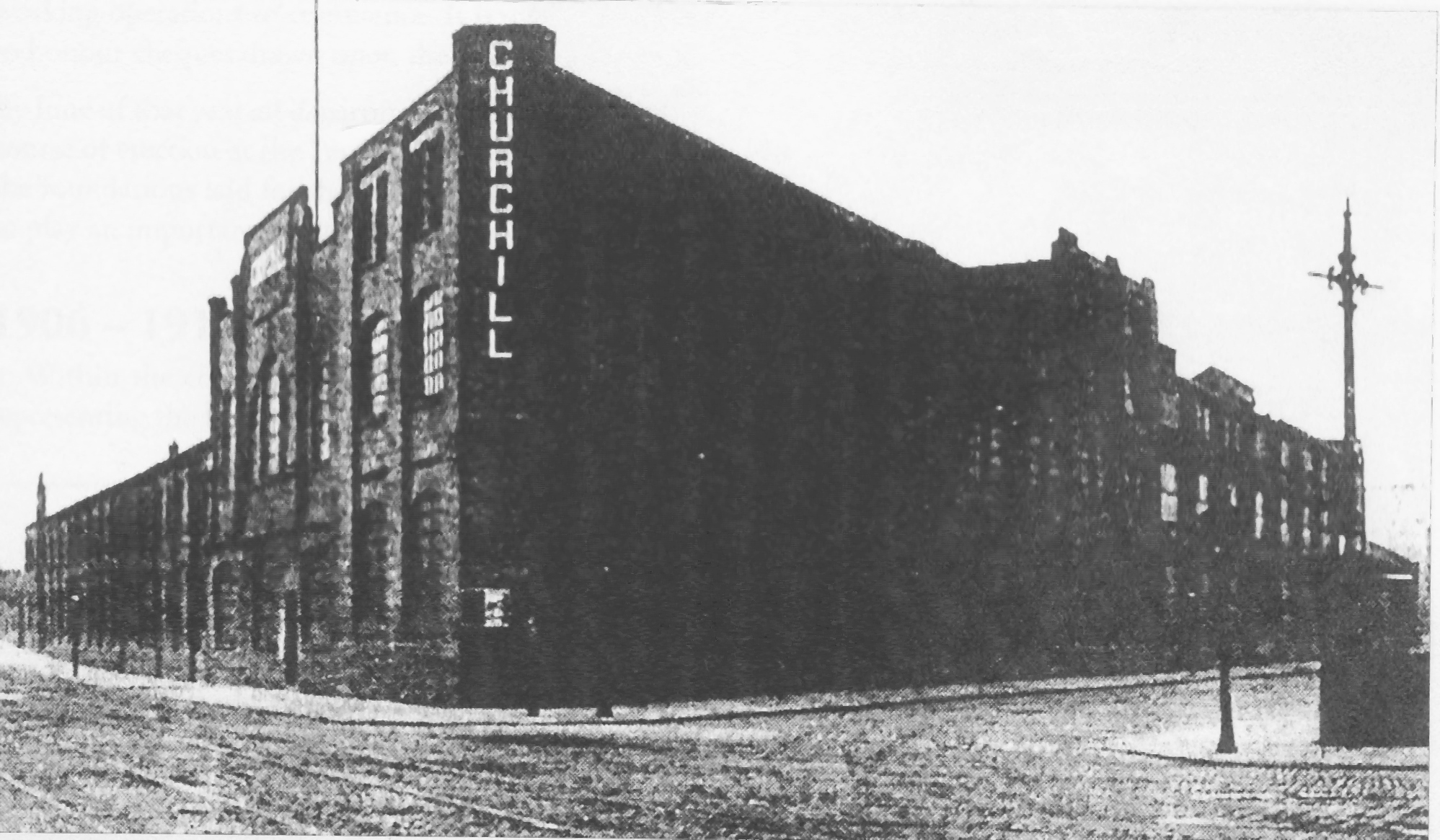
The Churchill Machine Tool Co factory at Pendleton, Salford

In 1918 The Churchill Machine Tool Co bought 11.5 acres (4.7 ha) of land at Broadheath, near Altrincham, from the Earl of Stamford. By 1920 the company had relocated all its production to that site, which put it at the heart of a growing concentration of engineering businesses which included H.W. Kearns & Co, George Richards & Co, Luke & Spencer Ltd, Schaffer & Budenberg and Linotype. The single-storey factory covered 3 acres (1.2 ha), affording potential for further expansion. "It forms in fact easily the largest concern of this type in Great Britain", said American Machinist, and was under the charge of H H Asbridge with S H March as general manager. March's business address according to the Institute of Mechanical Engineers' register in 1922 was Albion Street, Gaythorn, Manchester, and Fred Garbutt Anderson, AMIMechE, was at the Oxford Street address; the address for Asbridge, who was MIMechE, was Broadheath.

In 1920 Charles Churchill & Co participated in a machine tool exhibition at the Olympia exhibition centre in London between 4 and 25 September involving many manufacturers and agents. A tabulated list published at the time showed the company's stationary exhibits comprised machines for boring and drilling, centring, planing, shaping, drop forging and gear hobbing, as well as upright, radial and sensitive drills, furnaces, centre and precision lathes, "tool/cutter grinders" and twist-drill machinery. In addition, it exhibited running examples of boring and turning mills, machines for broaching, gear cutting, thread milling, horizontal plain milling, universal milling and vertical milling, along with internal, surface and "cylinder/plain/universal" grinders, automatic and "capstan/turret" lathes. There are many notices before and subsequent to this of the company's participation in exhibitions reported in American Machinist.

The American Machinist reported in 1922 that The Churchill Machine Tool Co was "now almost the only specialist in precision grinding machines in Great Britain" and that the uses of the process in the railway industry for the production of axle journals were by that time accepted as best practice and that the usage of it for piston rods and cylinders was being established. A summary-box to the article says that:

In Great Britain the grinding process is now being used extensively on passenger car axles (particularly the journals) [ie: passenger railway carriage axle bearing units], crosshead guide bars, links, piston rods, chilled rolls, granite rolls, brass rolls, rubber rolls, paper rolls, crankshafts, camshafts, piston rings, planer knives, ball race rings, aluminium pistons, lenses, plate glass edges, glass tubes. Experiments are being carried out on the grinding of cylinders for locomotive and other engines.

The Carborundum Company and Pratt & Whitney companies are referred to in the article, perhaps demonstrating that Churchill could not operate in isolation despite the "only specialist" status accorded to them early in the article. Supplying grinding machinery to railways, for use in new production and refurbishment of worn mechanisms, became an important new area of operations: post-war government sales of used machinery had flooded the domestic market for machine tools, but exports, initially to Indian railways and then elsewhere, went some way towards softening the blow, and the Churchill companies, whilst scarred, were able to ride out the worst of the post-war recession. Among the more unusual supplies made was a universal grinding machine used to grind the valves of trumpets for the Salvation Army.

An office opened at 35 Victoria Street, Bristol, where Lindsay Somerville AMIMechE worked for the company. Advertising indicates that there was an office in Leeds: the opening probably postdating Bristol possibly during 1918, as Bristol is listed in advertising without mention of the Leeds branch but citing all the other branches previously referred to.

The boards of directors were reconstituted in 1923. John Beresford Stuart Gabriel (b. 1 Aug 1888, Twickenham – d. 7 Jul 1979, Kenilworth), son of J W W Gabriel, had been assistant managing director of Charles Churchill & Co Ltd since 1920 and became joint managing director from 1923. In addition, Arthur Chamberlain (nephew of both Herbert and Walter) resigned his chairmanship of Kynoch Ltd and became chairman of both the Churchill companies in November, and H H Asbridge became a director of The Churchill Machine Tool Co. In March 1924 Greville Simpson Maginness followed Chamberlain from Kynoch to become managing director of The Churchill Machine Tool Co, and in that role he was over the years to expand the export markets for the business.

The emphasis on manufacturing, especially that done under licence, became even more apparent following the imposition of a 20% duty on imported machine tools and reduced demand, both triggered by the Great Depression. There was much innovation and many of these advances were pioneering techniques that are now universal, although from a trading perspective things were dire for the companies. In particular, The Churchill Machine Tool Co successfully harnessed the utility of hydraulics in many aspects of its machinery and developed a cambering mechanism for grinding rollers used in, for example, the paper industry. In 1932 H H Asbridge's "Hydrauto" bearing was introduced: this aided precision positioning of a workpiece with almost no intervening film of lubrication.

J W W Gabriel became sole managing director in 1932. The directors had been for some years working with the Cincinnati Milling Machine Co, of which Gabriel had been an employee before World War I, and in 1933 Cincinnati established an English subsidiary, with Gabriel as chairman. This worked with The Churchill Machine Tool Co in a joint manufacturing development project concerning precision grinders.

The machine tool company had a sales agent in Australia by 1932.

=== Reorganisation ===
Chamberlain resigned as chairman of Charles Churchill & Co amid a series of board disagreements in 1934. He took control of The Churchill Machine Tool Co and, with Maginness as managing director, in December of that year embarked on a scheme to expand production and replace obsolete machinery, some of it over 20 years old, in an attempt to achieve an average output figure of £40,000 per month. However, there were difficulties in decision-making and wariness as the clouds of war loomed, most notably because of the company's contracts to supply a needy Soviet Union with machine tools, which had done much to assist it out of the depths of depression.

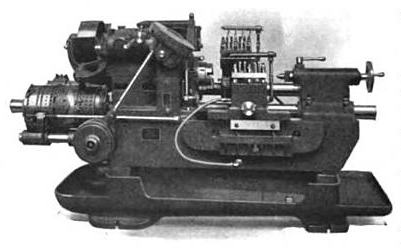
A Fay automatic lathe from 1921. Churchill-Redman subsequently built a range of these under licence from Jones & Lamson.

Francis Penny Burnage, son-in-law of Charles, became chairman of Charles Churchill & Co, and Gabriel continued to work for that company. They moved quickly to add manufacturing capacity to what would otherwise have been just a sales organisation: in December 1934 the company took over Cornelius Redman & Sons, renaming it Churchill-Redman Ltd. The facility was used initially to manufacture American machine tools under licence, rather as the machine tool company had started out in the early 1900s. A particularly notable example of its output was the licence granted in 1937 by Jones & Lamson of Springfield, Vermont, for the Fay automatic lathe. It was to become a pattern for Gabriel to orchestrate take-overs of other companies but not subsume them: they would have their own management team and retain a separate corporate identity.

Up to this point the Redman investment had not been a notable success: in the decade to 1934, despite an additional capital injection by Churchill, the business had made losses in half of the years, and in only one of the other years had it made any more than a modest profit. However, growth was steady after 1934, with profits of £23,000, £38,000, £54,000 and then a large jump to £139,000 in 1938. By 1939 the Redman operation alone employed 300 people, compared to around 30 in 1920. Motor industry expansion assisted in this growth, with Ford becoming a customer and Gabriel setting up a new machine tool division at Coventry Road, South Yardley, Birmingham, in 1938 to give easy access for the industry's centre, but rearmament was the most significant factor.

=== Subsequent history: The Churchill Machine Tool Co ===
Despite manufacturing developments The Churchill Machine Tool Co experienced a lean period from 1921 to 1934, being unable to distribute a dividend on its ordinary share capital. The commencement of European rearmament from 1935 is given as the cause of a dramatic turnaround in fortunes. A dividend of 12% was paid in that year; in the following year it was quadrupled and there was a special dividend of 125%. An adjustment to the share capital was made, and in 1938 the dividend was 40%, with an additional scrip bonus of 33.3%. There was a subsequent fall in the yield to 30%, but in cash terms, allowing for capital restructuring, the payment remained the same.

The economic historians Roger Lloyd-Jones and Myrrdin Lewis have analysed the company's minute books to derive the following information on profits during the inter-war period:

The Churchill Machine Tool Co Ltd: Summary of inter-war years profits (£ '000)
1922	1923	1924	1925	1926	1927	1928	1929	1930	1931	1932	1933	1934	1935	1936	1937	1938
−24.1	−32.1	−9.2	3.4	8	11.3	18.4	24.2	20.1	6.5	27.3	28.6	28.9	51.4	66.7	78.3	118.8

A further example of how innovatory the company could be is apparent in 1936, when it introduced the first electronics for control of precision grinding machines, this being a timing device.

Although there is no evidence of industrial unrest targeted at Churchill's activities until the 1970s, there was concern about the possibility during the inter-war years, and the probability of none occurring at all is unlikely. The Economic League was established as a right-wing organisation, consisting mainly of employers, to counteract the rise in communist and socialist propaganda and its associated activities during the Great War. Support for the League was particularly strong among the engineering companies in the Manchester area. While workers in the cotton industries, for example, seemed not generally to take a great interest in the Communist Party, left-wing educational groups and shop-floor agitators, those in the engineering industry—perhaps mostly more intelligent—did do so, and the apparent threat to capitalism and private wealth was more evident to the employers of such people. Among the League's less publicised, more nefarious activities was that of intelligence gathering and the promotion of systematic blacklisting methods. It co-operated with the police and government, infiltrated left-wing groups and used information from disaffected ex-supporters of such groups in order to obtain information about what it considered to be dangerous elements and tendencies, and disseminated the knowledge obtained, usually in a confidential manner. The Churchill Machine Tool Co was one of several companies which during 1936–37 was a recipient of information concerning reports of meetings held by anti-capitalist groups, the past and current activities of particular workers and even the names of those specifically blacklisted. Others who received the information at this time included A V Roe, Ferranti, Metropolitan-Vickers and Fairey Aviation.

The company announced post-tax profits in 1949 of £119,909 (tax: £140,500); for 1950 the figures were £164,704 and £201,500, respectively. Total dividend for those years was 30%. By 1952 the net profit was £146,318 (tax: £347,000) and in 1953 the respective figures were £228,583 and £449,000. The dividend for both of these years was 20%, but in 1953 there was also a special distribution of 2d/share for capital profits of £17,810 from sale of investments.

The company self-published its history for its golden jubilee year of 1956: The story of The Churchill Machine Tool Co. Ltd.: a history of precision grinding.

In 1959 The Churchill Machine Tool Co entered into an agreement to export its products to the US-based company Lapointe Machine Co, a company for which in earlier years it had held the Great Britain agency.

In 1958 the chairman, Sir Greville Maginness, who was also chairman of Roneo Ltd, reported that the two businesses combined had a workforce of at least 1,227 people. He was deputy chairman of Tube Investments (TI) but had handed over the managing director's role at Churchill to E W Honnisette in 1953.

The company was bought by BSA in 1961 at a cost of £8.5 million and became known in legal terms as BSA-Churchill Machine Tools Ltd. In October 1962 H G Sturgeon, OBE, previously managing director at de Havilland Aircraft, was appointed to the same position at Churchill; he moved on in 1964 to become managing director of the BSA group's Motorcycle division. In 1966 Churchill merged in a joint-venture agreement with Alfred Herbert and became part of Herbert-BSA Ltd, the intention being that the combined concerns would gain benefits from rationalisation and symbiosis of their activities. The general expectation – held also by the Department of Trade and Industry and the stock market – of rewards from the venture did not materialise and BSA sold its entire holding in August 1971, writing off £6.9M as a consequence of the need to have cash in hand to address issues elsewhere in its activities.

The UK economy was contracting by the early 1970s, and engineering businesses were rationalising their operations on a scale which raised many comments in Parliament and elsewhere. The ratio of unemployment to vacancies in engineering and the allied trades at June 1970 was more or less 1:1, but by September 1971 it was 5:1, i.e.: five people unemployed in the sector for every job available. In 1972 the Churchill factory in Altrincham was closed, despite industrial action there and at Alfred Herbert's Coventry factory to stop this happening. There were representations against the closure from Altrincham council to the government, including a meeting in February 1972 when the council and its delegation of industry experts met the Minister for Trade and Industry and said

It is anticipated that the proposals are basically to save the Alfred Herbert's Group ... Coventry does not really rank as a heavy Machine Tool manufacturing area. Alfred Herbert's have not really had substantial experience in grinders ... This would inevitably mean that there would be a difficulty in producing Churchill machines owing to the loss of expertise which could result in teething troubles of up to five years with the consequent loss of prestige orders and ultimately probably of Churchills itself. This could hardly achieve the object that they had in mind of increasing the workload at Edgwick [Coventry].

It was said in Parliament that 1,000 people were made redundant and that in Manchester 500 machine tool fitters were now chasing 10 jobs. Production moved to Coventry as the parent group, Herbert, faced losses of £4M, although Churchill had an order book of £2.25M that could provide sufficient work to keep its 1,100 workforce in jobs through to 1974. Order book value aside, it was also said in Parliament that Churchill had lost over £1M in the previous two years.

The Churchill Machine Tool Co was put into members' voluntary liquidation on 25 October 1973 with several other companies in the Herbert group. The company's name resurfaced only to be put into voluntary liquidation again on 15 March 1985. The winding-up resolutions on both these occasions occurred at meetings held at Canal Road, Coventry, although the appointed people were different.

A further revival of the company name took place: a company formed as Churchill Atlantic (Manchester) Co Ltd, company registration number 01469025, had been incorporated in 1979 and in 1999 was renamed The Churchill Machine Tool Co Ltd; two years later, in April 2001, it also failed and went into receivership. There is an Atlantic Street in Broadheath.

In 2011 the company name continued to be used: Retday Ltd, registration number 04186074, was incorporated in March 2001 and changed its name to The Churchill Machine Tool Co Ltd in June that year. It trades from Atlantic Works in Old Trafford, Manchester, and it uses the slogan "A century of precision grinding machinery".

Churchill Machine Tools (Coventry) Ltd (company registration 00087969) was liquidated in 1974. The significance of this company is uncertain but the low registration number indicates that the entity, even if not using the particular name, had existed for some considerable time: by the 1950s new companies were being issued numbers around the 00500000 region, and by the 2000s this had become a series starting around 01400000.

=== Subsequent history: Charles Churchill & Co Ltd ===
In 1946 Churchill-Redman Ltd bought the Longfield foundry in Halifax to provide extra production capacity and leased a part of the Vickers Armstrong Admiralty works in Scotswood, Newcastle. It was intended that the Newcastle site concern itself with a range of lathes intended for the motor industry, Austin and Vauxhall in particular; the Halifax operation would focus on manufacture of Fay lathes which were still being licensed from the US.

The company worked on tight profit margins immediately post-war. A combination of a shortage of skilled labour, outdated batch production methods and increasing costs in materials and payroll were matched by rising overhead, a shortage of materials and issues of absenteeism. The result was that despite a booming order book Redman was struggling to fulfil its commitments to customers, and gross margins on lathes were as low as 2.16%. The company was by no means unique in facing these difficulties but there was much urging, agonising and recriminating, by Gabriel and A K McKay, the Redman managing director since at least 1936, regarding how to deal with the issues. Some of this, perhaps inevitably as the war-time command economy reverted, was aimed at the government.

Things did improve for Churchill-Redman and the sales rose dramatically from £200,000 in 1946 to £1M by 1955. This was in part because of innovative product development at the Halifax site which ultimately produced the CR P5 and P6 profiling lathes: the conclusion of this development is described by Jeremy as being a range of "fully automatic, multi-tool and profiling lathes. A lathe with an automatic feed and delivery heralded an automatic machine tool production line." The expansion of the motor vehicle industry once again was a significant factor, driving demand for machine tools much as the bicycling boom of the 1890s had done. In 1957 the Scotswood operation moved across the River Tyne to Blaydon, where a factory was built especially for the manufacturing purpose intended. Among other products from that site was the Vertimax lathe, which used a vertical spindle and was of interest to motor vehicle manufacturers. This particular design originated from James Anderson, a garage owner in Glasgow, during the war and whose business was brought into the Churchill group of companies. Churchill Gear Machines Ltd was part of the group, having been established in Blaydon since 1956: the cause of its origin and the nature of its products is uncertain.

In 1950 Charles Churchill & Co, the parent company, moved its offices from London to Birmingham and in 1955 increased its share capital to £1.26M. By the financial year ending March 1962 it reported a group net profit of £575,352 and a dividend of 22.5%. Exports were up 26% and there were hopes of the sector eventually amounting to 40% of total output. Fixed assets had increased significantly: the business had taken over Newcast Foundries Ltd, Halifax-based heavy lathe manufacturer Denhams Engineering Co Ltd and Churchill-Milnes; it had spent £2M of its own resources building extensions and plant improvements to more than double its manufacturing capability compared to that in 1951. Information regarding Churchill-Milnes is lacking but a business called Henry Milnes manufactured lathes in the Bradford area for many years and it may be that this was the target of a take-over.

A new company, Charles H. Churchill Ltd, was established in 1962 to act as a group-wide selling organisation. Charles Churchill (Canada) Ltd traded from Toronto as a sales agency for machine tools in 1953, and by 1959 had at least one additional outlet in the country.

In a diversification from the machine tool sector, the company had a subsidiary business manufacturing glass-fibre boats. For this purpose there was an application for an Industrial Development Certificate to build premises at Tiverton in 1961. When this certificate was refused, on grounds that were somewhat contentious, the company was encouraged to seek alternative sites in Devon, including at Ilfracombe, but instead opted to take a site on the Isle of Wight so that it could satisfy export orders. Ralph Gabriel, son of J B S Gabriel, had become managing director by 1964, with J B S Gabriel as chairman. Ralph Gabriel loaned his 34-foot (10 m) sloop, the Archiv, to the Ocean Youth Trust in 1968.

J B S Gabriel announced a 14% fall in net profits for the company for the trading period 1963–64 (net £505,000; tax £419,000; dividend retained at 22.5%). Despite this the group was among the biggest machine tool organisations in the world, employing 2,000 people and having sales of £14M.

The company celebrated its centenary by commissioning a book detailing its history from 1865 to 1965.

Faced with increasing competition from Japan and elsewhere, and the need to cut labour costs and invest heavily in order to counteract this, in 1966 J B S Gabriel recommended the group be taken over. TI made an offer to buy the company and its subsidiaries for the sterling equivalent of US$30M and in 1967, as a TI company and with the Gabriels no longer involved, it announced an export order of gear processing machine tools to the USSR worth £1.8M.

In 1968 the Applied Research and Development Division of the company based in Daventry, demonstrated the first use of control tapes prepared by computer to control a lathe, a significant milestone in the development of CNC. This project was developed in conjunction with IBM.

In 1972 all production at Churchill-Redman in Halifax moved to Blaydon with the consequent loss of 350 jobs. This formed a part of TI's many rationalisation measures taken in the late 1960s and early 1970s, and the closure was explained as being due to the desire for greater productivity and a recognition of the low sales generated at the site. A Churchill factory at Bedford which had been operating since 1967 was closed at this time.

Companies in the Churchill group: changes of name - final corporate vehicle for dissolution in italics (Companies House records except where noted).
	Charles Churchill Ltd	Charles H Churchill Ltd	C Redman & Co Ltd	Denham Patent Bottling Machine Co Ltd	Churchill Gear Machines Ltd	Churchill Vertimax	Churchill Milnes	Newcast Foundries Ltd
Co. Reg. No.	00563431	00738913	00563725	00061504		SC029046		
Incorporated	26 March 1956	25 October 1962	29 March 1956					
*			Churchill-Redman Ltd	Denhams Engineering Co Ltd				
*				Churchill-Denhams Ltd				
*				Charles Churchill (Bedford) Ltd				
*				TI Matrix Tools Ltd				
1977	TI Churchill Ltd							
1978			TI Machine Tools Ltd		Churchill Gear Machines Ltd			
1983	TI Herbert-Churchill Ltd	TI Churchill Ltd						
1984						Churchill-Vertimax		
1985	TI Machine Tools Ltd		TI Herbert-Churchill Ltd					
1987(a)	Matrix Churchill Ltd	Alfred Herbert (Fletchamstead) Ltd	Herbert Churchill Ltd					
1987(b)			Alfred Herbert (Broadway) Ltd					
1988				Alfred Herbert (Edgbaston) Ltd				
1992	MC Realisations (Birmingham) Ltd							Newcast Foundries Ltd

Companies House has archived its information relating to the name changes asterisked and for the companies for which no detail is provided. It is notable that two of the companies listed—C Redman/Churchill-Redman and Charles Churchill Ltd (which has also lost its "and Co")—both acquired new registration numbers in March 1956.

== Recognition ==
Charles Churchill & Co was awarded The Queen's Award to Industry "for export achievement; and for technological innovation in machine tools by the Applied Research and Development Division, Churchill Gear Machines Ltd., and Churchill-Redman Ltd." in 1966.

The Churchill Machine Tool Co was awarded The Queen's Award to Industry "for export achievement and for technological innovation in air bearings in precision grinding machines" in 1969. Les Roberts, Sales Director between 1968 and 1971, wrote a highly critical account of the actions of the Alfred Herbert board of directors and their contribution by a wide range of decisions to the demise of the company. His comments include that the export award was a dubious pleasure:

Whether this award benefited the company in any way was open to question. What it did was to occupied much management time, cost money to publicise, and caused friction between Alfred Herbert the parent company and Churchill Machine Tools. The reason being, that the Chairman of Alfred Herbert received a Knighthood but the MD of Churchill had no reward at all!

Among more obviously serious matters, Roberts pointed to the Herbert board's imposition of a rule that shop-floor employees, mostly if not all male, must wear pink uniforms as being typical of its distance from reality, fad-ism and tendency to make mountains of molehills.

== Notable staff ==
The Churchill Machine Tool Co staff included some distinguished names: Herbert (Harry) Hales Asbridge (d. 12 Jul 1946) is credited with numerous patents, assigned to the company, during his time working there and had been awarded the MBE for industry-related services during the period 1914–18.

Sir Greville Simpson Maginness (b. 1888 – d. 23 Nov 1961), Kt. 1947, KBE 1953 was a lead delegate for the employers at the first Conference of the ILO in Washington (1919), President of the Engineering and Allied Employers' National Federation (1944–46), President of the Russo-British Chamber of Commerce from 1938 until his death and a member of the Engineering Advisory Council, Ministry of Supply (1946–61); he became President of the British Employers' Confederation, a forerunner of the CBI, in December 1946, when he was chairman and managing director of The Churchill Machine Tool Co Ltd.

The artist Richard Hamilton was a designer at Churchill Gear Machines Ltd between 1956 and 1962. Some of his work is included in the collection of the Tate Gallery.
