= The Railway, Broadheath =

Listed former pub in Greater Manchester, England

The Railway
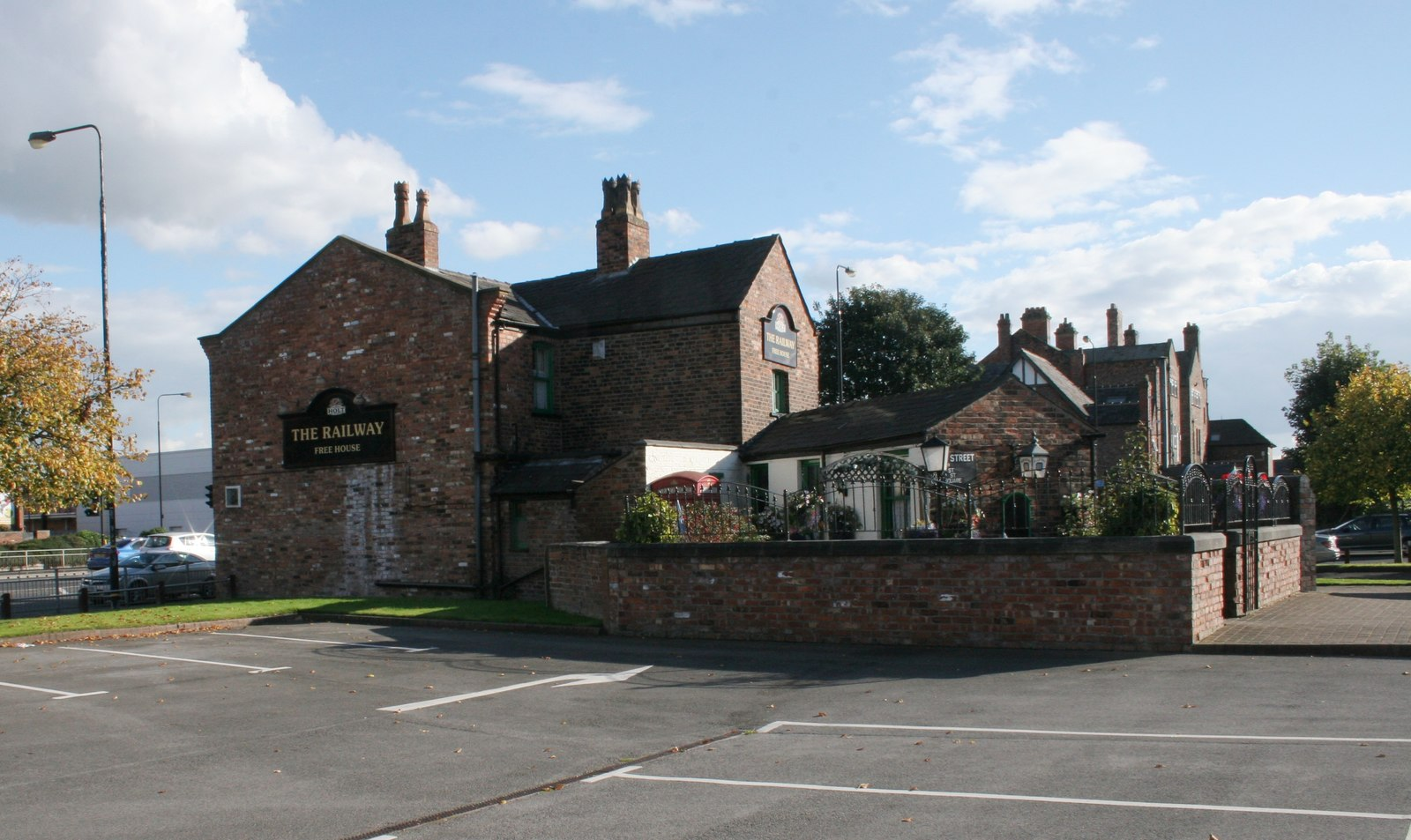
- The pub in 2016, before its closure in 2024

- Location within Greater Manchester

General information
- Status: Vacant
- Type: Public house (former)
- Location: 153 Manchester Road, Broadheath, Greater Manchester, England
- Coordinates: 53.3997°N 2.3527°W
- Year built: Mid-19th century
- Closed: 2024
- Owner: MWD Properties (NW) Ltd

Design and construction
- Designations

Listed Building – Grade II
- Official name: The Railway Inn public house
- Designated: 20 July 1993
- Reference no.: 1253114

The Railway is a Grade II listed former public house on Manchester Road in Broadheath, a suburb of Altrincham in Trafford, Greater Manchester, England. Built in the mid-19th century, it once stood in a row of cottages on the A56 but now survives as a solitary building beside Altrincham Retail Park. Its interior, regarded by the Campaign for Real Ale (CAMRA) as of "outstanding national historic importance", retains much of its original layout and fittings. The pub closed in 2024 after a police raid and licensing action, and as of November 2026 its future remains unclear.

== History ==
The building was constructed in the mid-19th century, according to its official listing, with additions made later.

On 20 July 1993, the Railway Inn was designated a Grade II listed building. The pub was originally part of a row of cottages along the A56 from Manchester to Altrincham. The cottages were demolished in 1996 for the development of Altrincham Retail Park, but The Railway's listed status prevented its demolition, so the building now stands on its own at the edge of the retail complex's car park.

It was included on the Campaign for Real Ale (CAMRA)'s National Inventory of Historic Pub Interiors before the inventory's grading system was revised. Under the revised scheme, it is rated three stars and its interior is regarded as being "of outstanding national historic importance".

On 20 May 2021, the pub was added to the list of assets of community value after being nominated by Trafford and Hulme CAMRA. The listing expired on 19 May 2026.

In 2024 Greater Manchester Police raided The Railway and found a trafficked woman being used for prostitution in an upstairs room. Two people were arrested in connection with alleged trafficking and brothel‑keeping, which they deny. Magistrates subsequently granted a three‑month closure order on Trafford Council's application, and the premises licence was placed under review. The council later revoked the licence in the interests of public safety. The building's freeholder was listed as being MWD Properties (NW) Ltd in March 2024. As of November 2026, no further update on the pub's status or future has been published.

== Architecture ==
=== Exterior ===
The building is constructed of red‑purple brick with a Welsh slate roof and two chimney stacks along the ridge. The front has two storeys and three bays, with the main entrance set slightly to the right. The doorway has a shaped surround with a curved head and a small fanlight above, and the door itself is panelled. There is one bay to the right of the entrance and two to the left, each with matching sash windows on both floors, set under shallow arched heads. The left‑hand side of the building narrows sharply at an acute angle towards the rear.

=== Interior ===
Inside, the tap room and bar parlour occupy the front of the building, separated by an entrance passage, with the bar area behind them and living quarters further to the rear. The tap room, bar parlour and bar all keep their 19th‑century features, including a curved counter with built‑in hand‑pulls. All the rooms have fixed seating, and each of the two front rooms contains a decorative 19th‑century fireplace, the bar parlour having a moulded surround and an overmantel mirror. Picture rails, skirting and door frames from the same period remain in place, and the doors have solid lower panels with glazed upper sections; the bar parlour door includes etched glass showing the room name above small rectangular panes.

== See also ==
- Listed buildings in Altrincham
- Listed pubs in Greater Manchester
