= Station Hotel, Altrincham =

Listed pub in Greater Manchester, England

Station Hotel
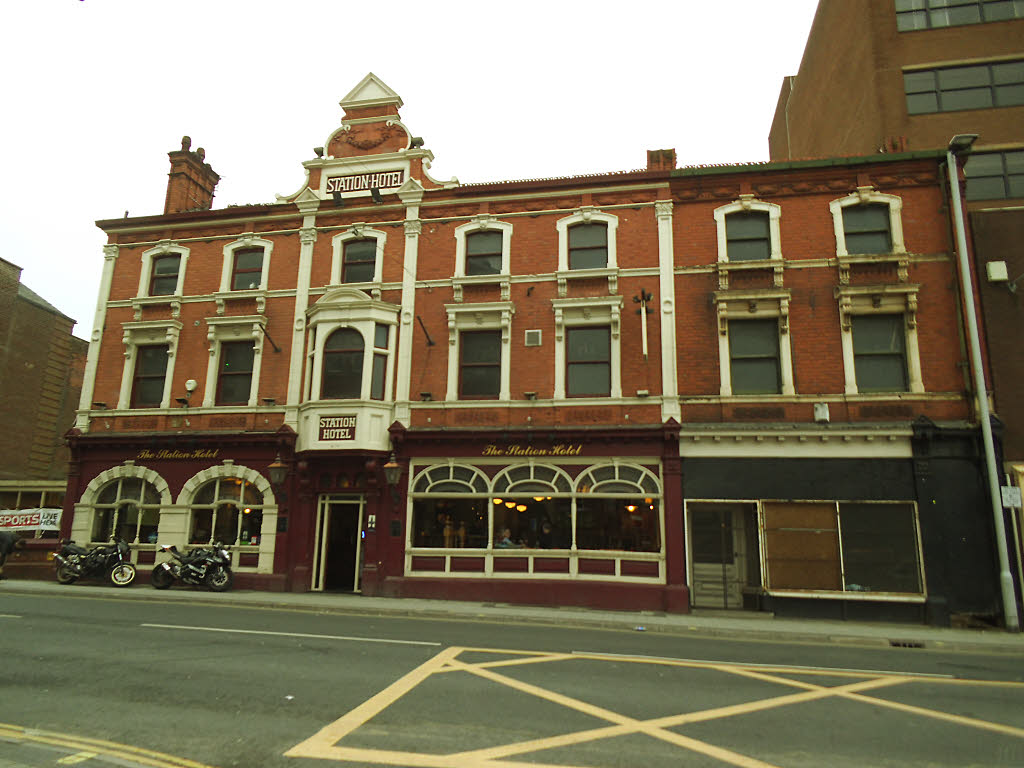
- The pub in 2017

- Location within Greater Manchester

General information
- Type: Public house
- Location: 44 Stamford New Road, Altrincham, Greater Manchester, England
- Coordinates: 53.3872°N 2.3488°W
- Year built: Late 19th century
- Renovated: 1929 (altered); 2026 (refurbished)
- Owner: Star Pubs & Bars

Design and construction
- Designations

Listed Building – Grade II
- Official name: Station Hotel
- Designated: 27 April 1992
- Reference no.: 1346199

Website
- Official website

The Station Hotel is a Grade II listed public house on Stamford New Road in Altrincham, a market town within Trafford, Greater Manchester, England. Built in the late 19th century, it was operating as a pub by the 1930s. It lies within the Stamford New Road conservation area, designated in 1987, and was added to the statutory list in 1992; the building forms a group with the clock tower outside Altrincham Interchange and with Stamford House. The pub is operated by Blind Tiger and underwent a refurbishment in early 2026.

== History ==
The building was constructed in the late 19th century, according to its official listing. The 1910 Ordnance Survey map shows it without an attributed name or designation, while the 1938 edition marks it as a public house. In 1929 the pub underwent unspecified improvement works carried out by the Manchester architectural practice Charles Clegg and Son.

In 1987 the site became part of the newly created Stamford New Road conservation area, and on 27 April 1992, the Station Hotel was designated a Grade II listed building. The listing covers Nos. 42 and 44 Stamford New Road, with No. 44 being the Station Hotel and No. 42 a shop, although Historic England records the whole building under the name "Station Hotel". It forms a group with the Grade II-listed clock tower outside Altrincham Interchange, and with Stamford House (Nos. 1 to 11 Stamford New Road).

The Station Hotel underwent a refurbishment in early 2026, including internal redecoration, alterations to seating areas and the addition of new facilities. As of May 2026, the Campaign for Real Ale (CAMRA) listed Scottish & Newcastle as the freeholder. Although the company was dissolved in 2008, its pub estate is now operated by Star Pubs & Bars. The pub itself is operated by Blind Tiger.

== Architecture ==
=== Exterior ===
The building is constructed of red brick with painted stone details and some decorative terracotta, and has a slate roof. It has a double‑depth layout, with the Station Hotel at No. 44 occupying a wider frontage and the shop at No. 42 a narrower one, along with various rear additions. The design mixes elements from different styles. It has three storeys and a main frontage of five bays, with a further two bays to the right.

No. 44 is arranged almost symmetrically. Its front includes a stone base, a central bay set slightly forward, and narrow vertical panels at the sides. The upper floors have continuous sill bands, a line of terracotta decoration, and a projecting cornice. The central entrance has a framed doorway with an overlight containing three small arched stained‑glass panes. Above this is a prominent first‑floor oriel window with a panel reading Station Hotel, and above the roofline a shaped gable with further lettering and terracotta ornament.

To the left of the entrance, the ground floor has two wide arched openings with three‑light windows. To the right is a large shop‑style window with three panes, arched overlights and decorative spandrels. The upper floors have sash windows with terracotta panels beneath and bold surrounds; the first‑floor windows have small cornices, while those on the top floor have shallow arched heads.

=== Interior ===
Inside, the pub keeps a layout dating from around 1900, centred on a panelled island bar with rounded corners that remains largely unchanged.

== See also ==
- Listed buildings in Altrincham
- Listed pubs in Greater Manchester
