= Church of St Margaret, Altrincham =

Listed church in Greater Manchester, England

- St Margaret's Church, Altrincham
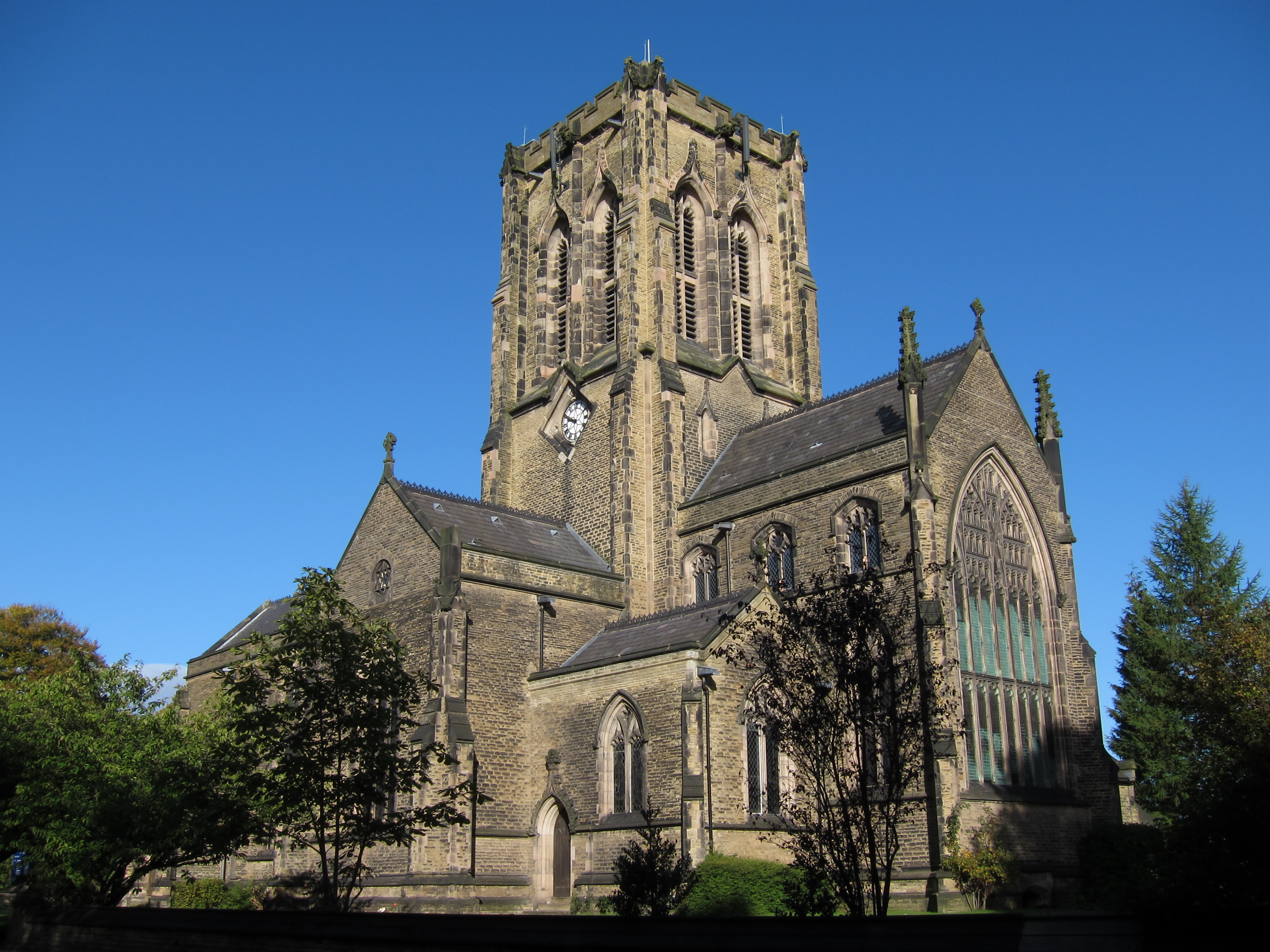
- Church of St Margaret in 2010

- Location in Greater Manchester
- 53.3870°N 2.3621°W
- OS grid reference: SJ 76017 87852
- Address: Dunham Road, Altrincham, Greater Manchester
- Country: England
- Denomination: Anglican
- Website: stmargaretschurchaltrincham.com

History
- Dedication: St Margaret
- Consecrated: 13 June 1855

Architecture
- Heritage designation: Grade II*
- Designated: 12 July 1985
- Architect(s): William Hayley; Walter Tapper (extension)
- Architectural type: Church
- Style: Gothic Revival / Perpendicular Gothic
- Years built: 1853–1855; 171 years ago 1923–1925 (extended)

Specifications
- Materials: Rock-faced stone, ashlar, slate

Administration
- Diocese: Diocese of Chester

The Church of St Margaret is an Anglican parish church on Dunham Road in Altrincham, a market town in Trafford, Greater Manchester, England. It forms part of the ecclesiastical deanery of Bowdon in the Diocese of Chester. The building was designed by the architect William Hayley in the Perpendicular Gothic style and erected between 1853 and 1855. It was extended in the early 1920s to designs by Walter Tapper. The church is recorded in the National Heritage List for England as a Grade II* listed building.

== History ==
The church was commissioned by George Grey, 7th Earl of Stamford, as a memorial to his sister Margaret, who died in 1852. The final design was prepared by the Manchester architect William Hayley of the firm Hayley and Forster. Construction on the site began in 1851, paused for two years, resumed in 1853, and was completed in 1855 at a cost of £20,000.

The church was consecrated on 13 June 1855 by Rev. John Graham, the bishop of Chester.

During the later 19th century the church interior was enriched with stained glass by W. Sinclair of Cheetham Hill, installed around 1860. In the aftermath of the First World War, the west end of the church was extended as part of a larger memorial scheme initiated by the then‑vicar, the Rev. Hewlett Johnson, who later became known as "The Red Dean of Canterbury". The ambitious plan was never fully realised, leaving the external brickwork of the extension unfinished.

In 1927 the church's spire was demolished after it was deemed unsafe.

On 12 July 1985, the Church of St Margaret was designated a Grade II* listed building.

The church remains part of the Benefice of Dunham Massey within the Deanery of Bowdon in the Diocese of Chester.

== Architecture ==
The church is constructed of rock‑faced stone with ashlar dressings from Hollington and is roofed in slate. Its plan comprises a nave, transepts, aisles, a south porch, a crossing tower, and a sanctuary incorporating a side chapel and vestry. The nave projects two bays further west than the aisles, a result of an incomplete scheme dating from 1923.

The aisles, each of four bays, have weathered buttresses, a projecting plinth, a sill band, an eaves parapet, and three‑light windows in a 14th‑century style. The porch, set in the second bay, is marked by diagonal buttresses. The clerestory is lit by two‑light windows. The transepts have angled buttresses with gablets and pinnacles that are crocketed—those to the south now lost—and three‑light, two‑tier windows. The chancel, of three bays, includes two‑light clerestory windows, angle buttresses with crocketed pinnacles, and a seven‑light, two‑tier rectilinear east window.

The central tower, of two stages and formerly topped by a steeple removed in 1927, has angle buttresses with offsets and gablets, a clock face, two‑light belfry openings with arched ogee dripmoulds to each side, and a castellated parapet.

=== Interior ===
Internally, the nave arcade is in a Perpendicular style and is surmounted by an ornate angelic hammerbeam roof, with carved musicians set at the springing of the arches. It is said to have been based on the medieval roof of Westminster Hall. The chancel contains a piscina and sedilia, a substantial free‑standing late 19th‑century alabaster reredos (with an earlier reredos surviving behind it), and a highly elaborate canted Gothic panelled ceiling. The crossing is defined by tall arches. Fittings include an organ chamber, carved screens, a pulpit, and a range of stained glass windows.

== See also ==
- Grade II* listed buildings in Greater Manchester
- Listed buildings in Altrincham
