= St Alban's Church, Broadheath =

Coordinates: 53.4024°N 2.3520°W

- Location in Greater Manchester
- OS grid reference: SJ 767 896
- Location: Lindsell Road, Broadheath, Altrincham, Greater Manchester
- Country: England
- Denomination: Anglican
- Website: St Alban, Broadheath

History
- Status: Parish church
- Dedication: Saint Alban

Architecture
- Functional status: Active
- Heritage designation: Grade II
- Designated: 12 July 1985
- Architect: Austin and Paley
- Architectural type: Church
- Style: Gothic Revival
- Groundbreaking: 1899
- Completed: 1900

Specifications
- Materials: Brick with stone dressings Tiled roofs

Administration
- Province: York
- Diocese: Chester
- Archdeaconry: Macclesfield
- Deanery: Bowdon
- Parish: St Alban, Broadheath

Clergy
- Vicar: Revd Daud Gill

St Alban's Church is in Lindsell Road, Broadheath, Altrincham, Greater Manchester, England. It is an active Anglican parish church in the deanery of Bowdon, the Archdeaconry of Macclesfield, and the diocese of Chester. The church is recorded in the National Heritage List for England as a designated Grade II listed building.

== History ==
The first church services in Broadheath were conducted in 1853 in a canal boat on the Bridgewater Canal. In 1871 a school was built and the services were moved there. Building of the church began in 1899. It was designed by the Lancaster firm of architects, Austin and Paley, and opened for worship on 8 November 1900. The vestry and bellcote were added in 1902. St Alban's became a parish in its own right in January 1911. The west end of the church was not finished at the time, the nave having only two bays. It was completed towards the end of the 20th century, the architect being Geoff Worsley, and the additions were consecrated in 2000. In 2008 an immersion font was installed in the nave.

== Architecture ==
St Alban's is constructed in brick with stone dressings, and is roofed in clay tiles. Its plan consists of a nave with a clerestory, north and south aisles, north and south transepts, a vestry, and a chancel. The clerestory has three-light windows, and there are four-light windows along the sides of the aisles. The east window has five lights, and the west wall is blank. The south transept forms a continuation of the aisle, but the north transept is taller, it carries the bellcote, and has its own roof. The vestry has a pyramidal roof.

Inside the church, the brick arcades are carried on octagonal stone piers. In the chancel are a sedilia and piscina, both with ogee-heads. The 2000 extension contains doors leading to offices. The immersion font is "like a narrow swimming pool in the middle of the nave".

== See also ==
- Listed buildings in Altrincham
- List of churches in Greater Manchester
- List of ecclesiastical works by Austin and Paley (1916–44)
