= Associated British Machine Tool Makers =

British trade association

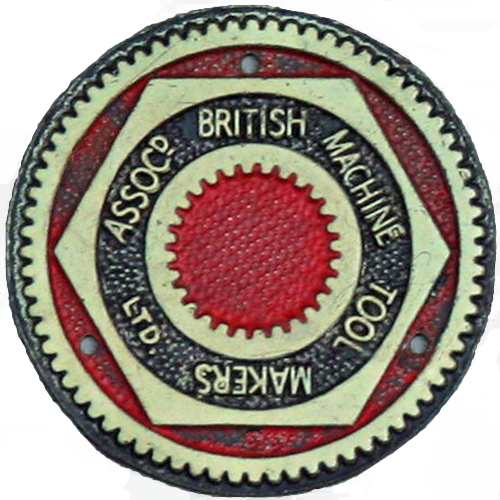

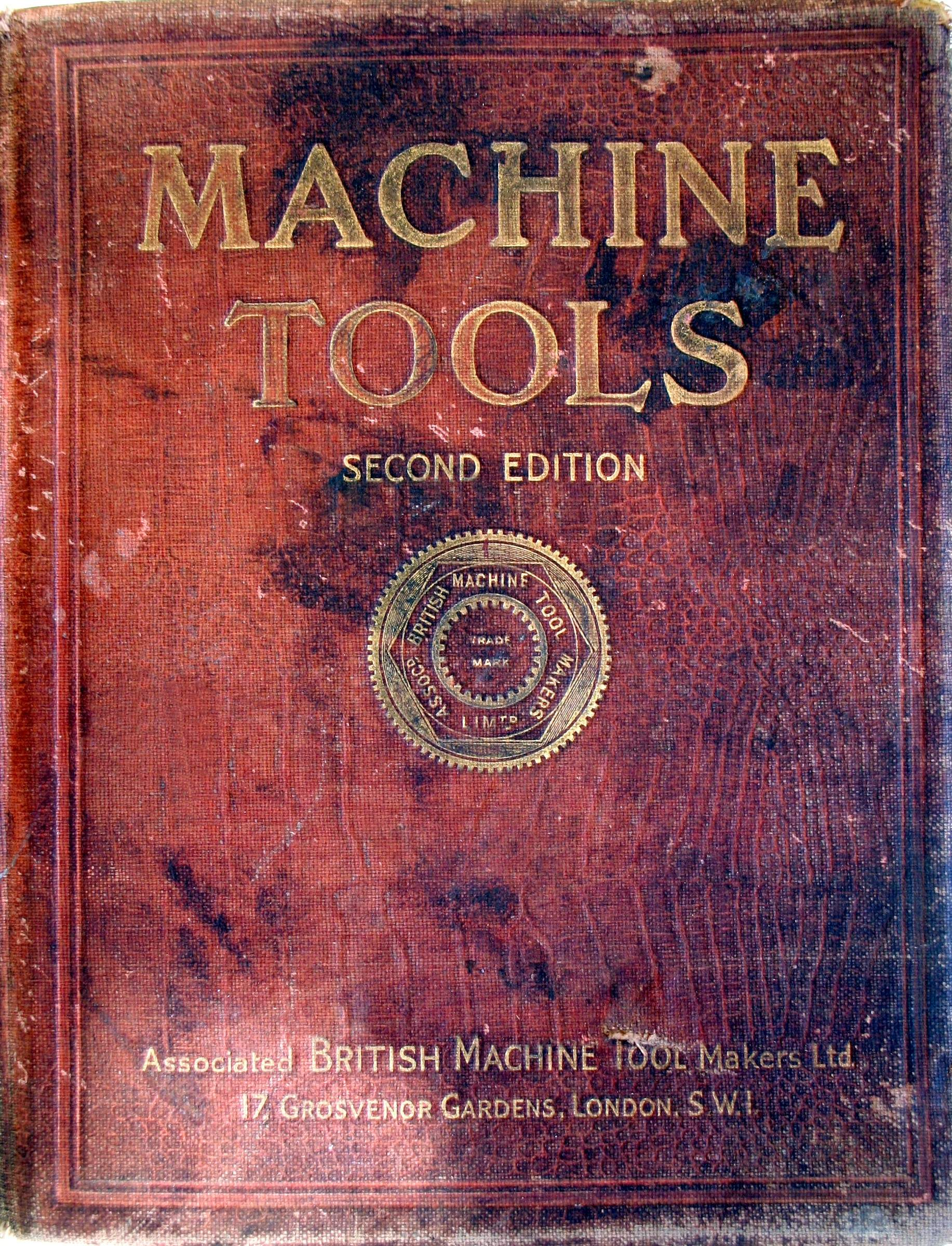

Associated British Machine Tool Makers Ltd or ABMTM was a trade association of British machine tool builders, established on 14 February 1917. Working with an initial capital of £100,000, the founding firms were all manufacturers of high-quality machines. The offices were at 34 Victoria Street, London.

The idea behind the Association was to avoid duplication in manufacture and for each firm to specialise in producing a narrow range of machines, thereby averting unnecessary competition. A joint selling agency was established at 17 Grosvenor Gardens in London with trading companies in Italy, France and Belgium, the objective being an increase of sales of British machines in the colonies and other countries. There were also plans to work with existing outlets in countries such as China.

Essentially the Association was a central selling organisation, enabling its members to retain their identity and particular brand of production and administration.

The founder members were:

- James Archdale Ltd (Birmingham) Light radial drills and certain sizes of milling machines
- William Asquith Ltd (Halifax) Mainly heavy radial and vertical drills
- James Butler & Co (Halifax) Light slotters, light planers and shapers
- Churchill Machine Tool Co (Manchester) Grinding machines
- Kendall & Gent (Manchester) Plano-mills
- G. Richards & Co (Manchester) Boring mills
- J.Parkinson & Son (Shipley) Universal milling machines
- Smith & Coventry Ltd (Salford) Plain and universal millers, high speed planers, gear-cutting machines
- John Lang & Sons Ltd (Johnstone) Lathes of light patterns
- T. Shanks & Co (Johnstone) Heavy lathes, planers and slotters
- H. W. Ward & Co (Birmingham) Capstan lathes
