= St George's Church, Altrincham =

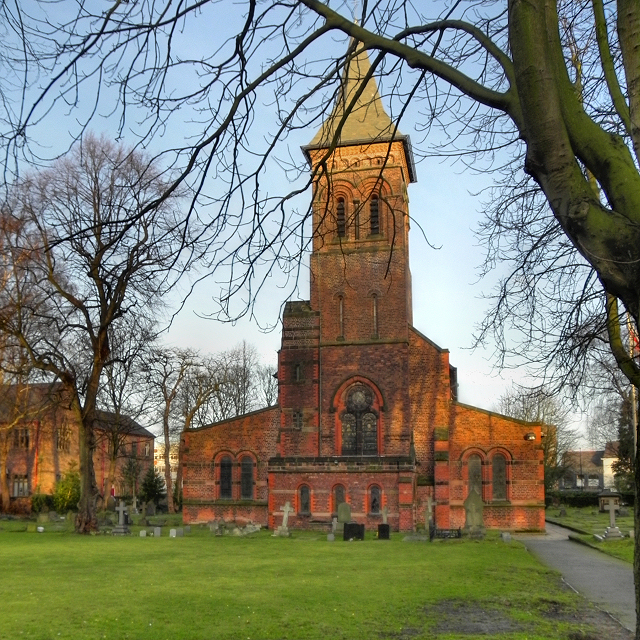
- St George's Church, Altrincham, from the west

- Location in Greater Manchester
- 53.3900°N 2.3511°W
- OS grid reference: SJ 76744 88196
- Location: Altrincham, Greater Manchester
- Country: England
- Denomination: Anglican
- Website: St George, Altrincham

History
- Status: Parish church
- Dedication: Saint George

Architecture
- Functional status: Active
- Heritage designation: Grade II
- Designated: 12 July 1985
- Architect: Paley and Austin
- Architectural type: Church
- Completed: 1897

Specifications
- Materials: Red brick with terracotta dressings Slate spire and clay tile roofs

Administration
- Province: York
- Diocese: Chester
- Archdeaconry: Macclesfield
- Deanery: Bowdon
- Parish: St George, Altrincham

Clergy
- Vicar: Revd Claire Corley

St George's Church is in the town of Altrincham, Greater Manchester, England. The church is recorded in the National Heritage List for England as a designated Grade II listed building. It is an active Anglican parish church in the diocese of Chester, the archdeaconry of Macclesfield and the deanery of Bowdon.

== History ==
The original church was built as a chapel of ease to St Mary's Church, Bowdon in 1799. The tower and spire date from 1874 and the chancel from 1886. In 1896–97 the Lancaster architects Austin and Paley rebuilt the nave and aisles.

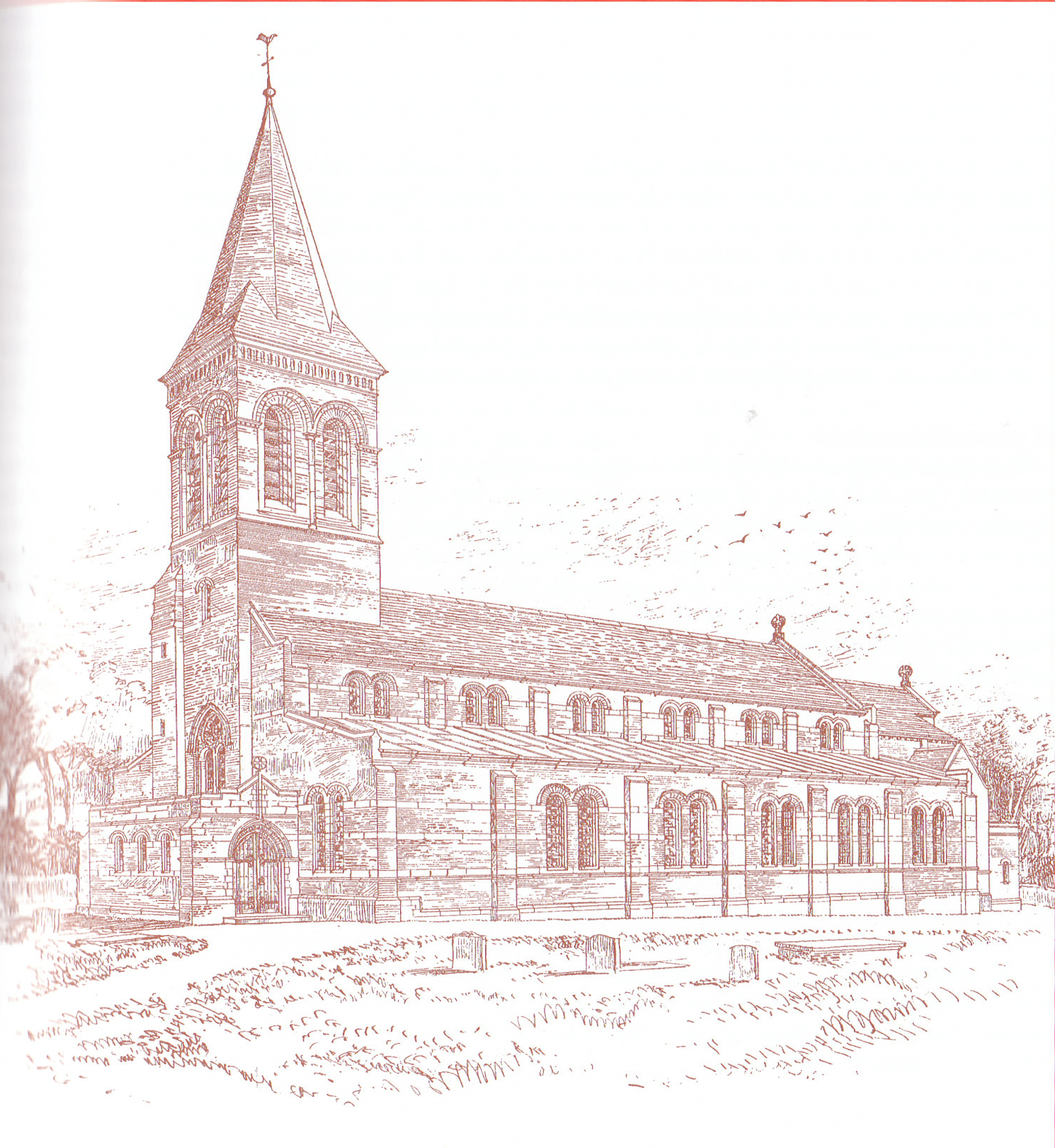
Sketch of proposed Church prepared by architects Austin & Paley in 1895.

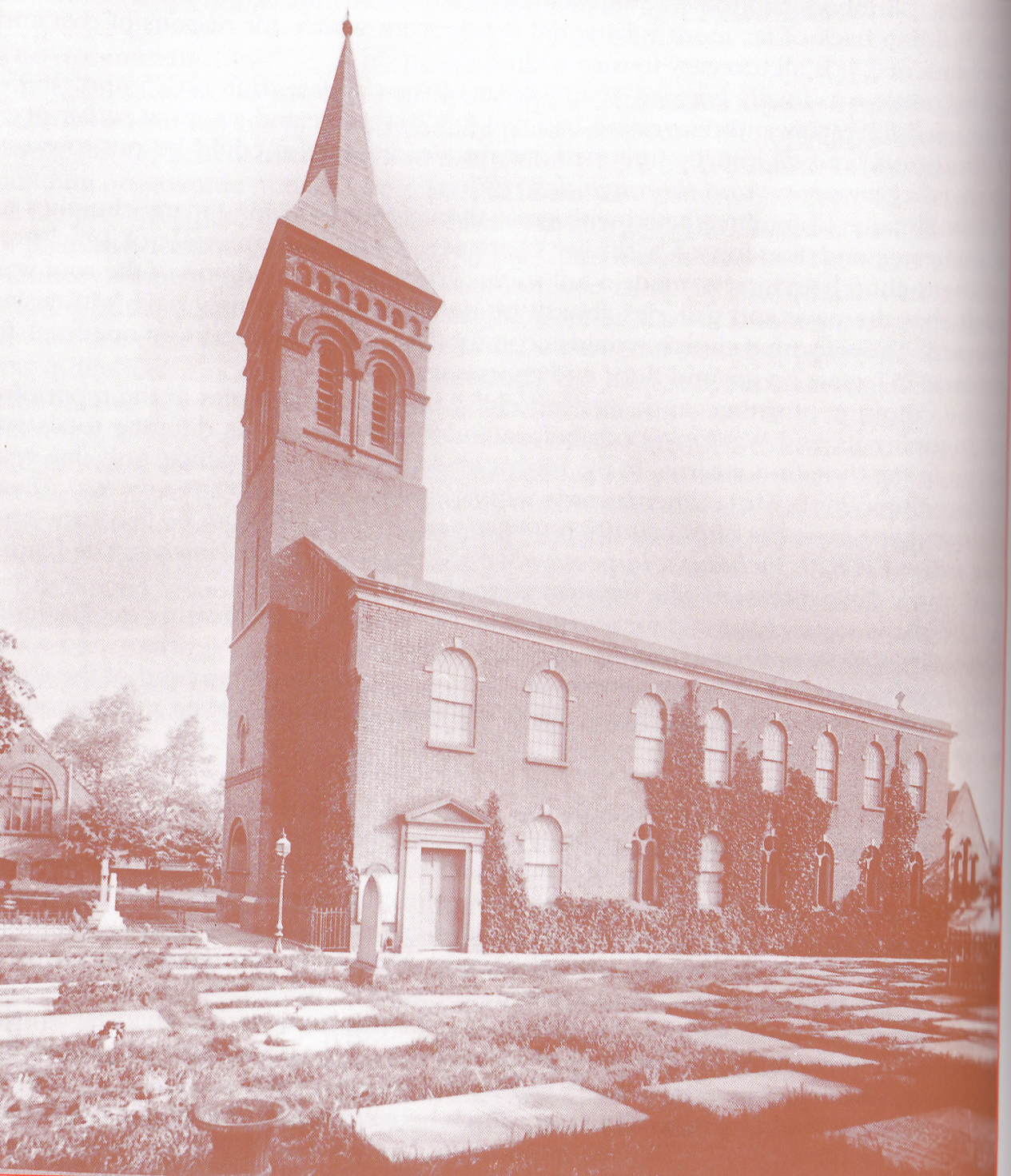
Picture of St George's Altrincham from the south in 1895.

The History of the Parish Church of St George's, Altrincham has its roots within the Wesleyan Movement. John Wesley, the founder of Methodism, made his first visit to the town in 1738. He was then a young man of 35. He returned several times, his last visit being on Easter Monday, 1790, only one year before his death. His purpose on that occasion was to preach at the first Wesleyan chapel in the town in Chapel Walk – later to become Regent Road.

A man named Oswald Leicester was a successful grocer in the time when grocers were becoming rich from exotic foods from the Thirteen Colonies. His third son was born in 1761 and baptised on 17 September 1761: he was Oswald Leicester Jnr. and became known as "The Founding Father of St George's Altrincham".

=== The First Sunday School ===
In 1783 the young Oswald Leicester, then only 22, formed a Sunday School in Altrincham; renting the upper room of a cottage in Ashley Road, Altrincham, then known as Thorley Moor Lane. There, on Sundays, children climbed the stone outer flight to learn to read and write, to hear Bible stories. He had closely followed the example of Robert Raikes who had founded the first Sunday School in 1780. It is very likely that both Leicesters were influenced by Wesley's teachings.

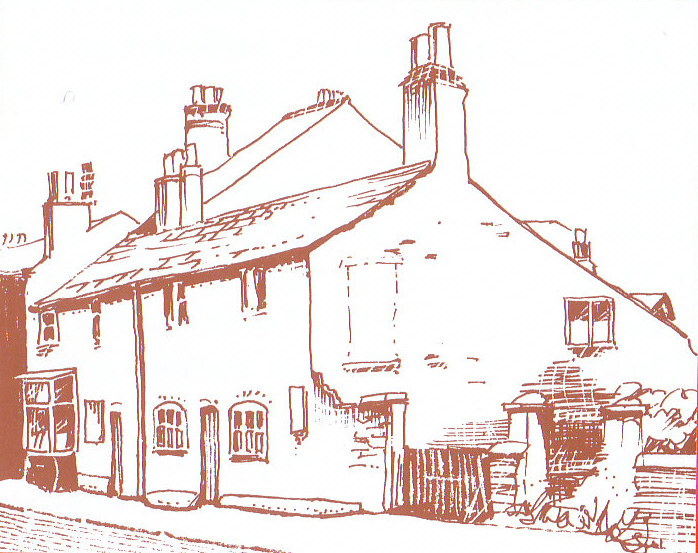
Oswald Leicester's first Sunday School 1783.

There is no evidence, however, that the Sunday School was supported by the Wesleyans. It must be regarded as an independent act of zeal and faith by the Leicesters, one which would lead in time to the building of the Parish Church of Altrincham.

== Architecture ==
=== Exterior ===
The church is constructed in red brick with terracotta dressings. It has a slate spire and clay tile roofs. Its plan consists of a west tower and porch, a nave with a clerestory, north and south six-bay aisles which continue alongside the tower, and a polygonal chancel with a vestry and chapel. The tower is in three stages with corbelled eaves. The east window has three lights above which is a rose window. The other windows have semicircular heads.

=== Interior ===
In the chancel is a memorial to Rev. O. Leicester, the church's first curate-in-charge who died in 1831. Also in the church are two painted churchwardens' staves dated 1838. The stained glass windows in the chancel dating from 1895 were designed by Mary Lowndes, the first woman glazier in the Arts and Crafts movement and a leading figure in the suffragette movement. The two-manual organ is in the west gallery. It was built in 1977 by Wood Wordsworth & Co. of Leeds, using the case, some pipework and other items from Bridge End Chapel, Brighouse.

== Members ==
=== Incumbents ===
Years active	Name
1799–1831	Revd Oswald Leicester
1831–1834	Revd George Ranking
1834–1843	Revd Wilmot Cave Browne Cave
1843–1856	Revd Dr Francis Orton DCL
1856–1859	Revd John B.Honnywill
1859–1868	Revd George London
Vicars of the Parish Church since	1868
1868–1893	Revd George London
1893–1902	Revd William Maurice Bonner Lutener
1902–1914	Revd Ernest Robert Tarbuck, BA
1914–1925	Revd Ernest Scales Oliver
1925–1944	Revd William Henry Farnes Palin LTh Honorary Canon of Chester Cathedral
1944–1963	Revd Oscar Littler, LTh, Hon CF
1963–1976	Revd Michael Henshall, BA, Honorary Canon of Chester Cathedral
1976–1990	Revd Roger Kearten Faulkner, Honorary Canon of Chester Cathedral
1990–2006	Revd Brian Roy McConnell Dip The Honorary Canon of Chester Cathedral Rural. Dean of Bowdon Deanery. Residentiary Canon warden at Carlisle Cathedral (Present Position)
2006–2021	Revd Edmund John Betts, DProf, MA, Dip Th, DPS 2022 - present Revd Claire Corley

== See also ==
- Listed buildings in Altrincham
- List of churches in Greater Manchester
- List of ecclesiastical works by Austin and Paley (1895–1914)
