= Listed buildings in Altrincham =

Altrincham is a town in the Metropolitan Borough of Trafford, Greater Manchester, England. The town, together with the adjacent areas of Broadheath and Timperley, contains 53 listed buildings that are recorded in the National Heritage List for England. Of these, one is listed at Grade II*, the middle grade, and the others are at Grade II, the lowest grade.

Altrincham originated as a market town. The Bridgewater Canal was built passing through the Broadheath area in 1765, and the railway arrived in 1849. During the 19th century the town grew as a commercial centre, and as a commuter town for Manchester. The oldest listed building dates from the middle of the 18th century, and most date from the early and middle 19th century. The majority of listed buildings are houses and associated structures, and commercial and civic buildings. Some industry arose adjacent to the Bridgewater Canal, but the only listed buildings surviving from this are buildings associated with a former factory. A bridge crossing the canal is also listed. The other listed buildings include churches and a vicarage, public houses, a boundary stone, a clock tower, and a war memorial.

== Key ==
Grade	Criteria
II*	Particularly important buildings of more than special interest
II	Buildings of national importance and special interest

== Buildings ==
Name and location	Photograph	Date	Notes	Grade
The Elms; 53.38589°N 2.35514°W	—	Mid-18th century	The house was extended later in the century, and again in the following two centuries. It is in brick on a stone plinth, with a timber eaves cornice and a hipped slate roof. There are two storeys, a total of six bays, and the 20th-century rear extension has a flat roof. On the front is a 20th-century porch, a door with a decorative fanlight, and the windows are sashes with stone sills and cambered brick arches.	II
Former Orange Tree Inn; 53.38914°N 2.35072°W		Late 18th century	Two houses, later combined into a public house, in brick, one painted, and the other rendered, with a timber framed core and a roof mainly in artificial slate. There are three storeys and five bays. On the ground floor is a pub front with arched windows and tiled pilasters, and an arched doorway on the left. The right two bays are taller and have a bracketed eaves cornice and a parapet. The middle floor contains two oriel windows, and elsewhere, in both parts, are modern windows.	II
Stamford Estates office and National Trust shop 53.38822°N 2.35156°W	—	Late 18th century	The office is in brick on a stone plinth with a sill band, a modillion eaves cornice, and a hipped stone-slate roof. There are two storeys, a symmetrical front of four bays, and a one-bay extension to the left. The original central two bays project slightly under a pediment. The doorway has fluted ¾ columns, side lights, and a decorative fanlight. The windows are sashes, and in the outer bays on the ground floor they are in a semicircular-headed recess. In the right return is a blocked carriage entrance with a semicircular head, and a parapet above.	II
The Old Hall; 53.39044°N 2.33670°W	—	Late 18th century	A house, later used for other purposes, it is in rendered brick on a stone plinth, with a modillion eaves cornice and a slate roof. There are three storeys, five bays, three-bay single-storey wings on both sides, and later rear extensions. The central three bays project slightly, and contain a doorway with pilasters, a fanlight, and an open pediment. In the main part is 20th-century glazing, and the wings each have two Venetian windows.	II
Seamon's Moss Bridge; 53.39407°N 2.37316°W		1776	The bridge carries Seamon's Road over the Bridgewater Canal. It is in brick with sandstone dressings, and consists of a single segmental arch. The bridge has a band, stone coping partly replaced in brick, and brick buttresses.	II
St George's Church; 53.39009°N 2.35116°W		1799	The oldest part of the church is the base of the tower. In 1873–74 J. Medland and Henry Taylor rebuilt the upper part of the tower, in 1886 the chancel was rebuilt, and in 1896–97 Austin and Paley rebuilt the nave. The church is in red brick with terracotta, it has a slate spire, and clay tile roofs. It consists of a nave with a clerestory, north and south aisles, a chancel with a polygonal apse, vestry and chapel, and a west tower with a porch and a spire. The windows have semicircular heads, and at the east end is a rose window.	II
2, 4, 6 and 8 Normans Place; 53.38588°N 2.35421°W	—	c. 1810	A row of four houses with a modillion eaves cornice and a slate roof. Each house has two storeys, a double-depth plan, two bays, and a rear wing. The doorways have ¾ Tuscan columns, a decorative fanlight, and an open pediment. There is one canted bay window, and the other windows are sashes with stone sills and cambered brick arches.	II
Richmond House; 53.38570°N 2.35527°W	—	c. 1820	A brick house on a stone plinth, with a moulded eaves cornice, a brick parapet, and a slate roof. There are two storeys, a double-depth plan, and three bays, with a single-storey extension on the left, and a two-storey extension to the right. The doorway has a Regency surround and an ornate fanlight, and the windows are replacement sashes with stone sills and cambered brick heads.	II
8 Dunham Road; 53.38871°N 2.35136°W	—	Early 19th century	Offices in brick on a stone plinth, with stone dressings, bands, modillioneaves, and a slate roof. There are three storeys, a double-depth plan, and five bays. The doorway has a moulded surround, enriched console brackets, and a cornice. The windows on the lower two floors are sashes with stone sills and cambered brick arches, and on the top floor they have semicircular heads with 20th-century glazing.	II
5 Market Street; 53.38834°N 2.35095°W	—	Early 19th century	A brick house on a stone plinth, with a dentilled eaves cornice, a slate roof, three storeys, and two bays. Steps lead up to a doorway on the right with fluted ¾ columns and a decorative fanlight. The windows are sashes with stone sills and flat brick arches, and on the roof is a gabled dormer.	II
7 Market Street; 53.38826°N 2.35104°W	—	Early 19th century	A house, later offices, in brick on a stone plinth, with an eaves cornice, a parapet and a slate roof. It has three storeys, a double-depth plan, a symmetrical front of five bays, and small rear wings. Segmental steps lead up to a doorway with ¾ columns and a segmental fanlight. The windows are sashes with stone sills, flat brick arches, and keystones.	II
10 and 12 Market Street; 53.38842°N 2.35123°W	—	Early 19th century	Two houses, later offices, in brick with a slate roof, three storeys, and one bay each. On the ground floor are 19th-century shop fronts, each office with a doorway to the right, an entry between, and a cornice with decorative consoles. On the upper floors are sash windows with stone sills and flat brick arches, and at the rear are horizontally-sliding sashes.	II
14 and 16 Market Street; 53.38832°N 2.35136°W		Early 19th century	A pair of houses, later offices, in brick on a stone plinth, with a moulded eaves cornice, and a roof of slate and stone-slate. There are three storeys, No. 14 has two bays, and No. 16 has four, the first two bays being slightly recessed. The doorway to No. 14 has fluted pilasters, a fanlight, and a wedge lintel, and the doorway to No. 16 has a semicircular head, ¾ Tuscan columns and a fanlight. The windows are sashes with stone sills; those in No. 14 with wedge lintels, and those in No. 16 with cambered brick arches.	II
16 Old Market Place; 53.38911°N 2.35005°W	—	Early 19th century	A house, later offices, in roughcast brick with stone dressings and a slate roof. There are three storeys, a double-depth plan, and two bays. Steps with railings lead up to a doorway with fluted ¾ Doric columns, and a segmental fanlight. The windows are sashes with stone sills.	II
Nursery Cottage; 53.38458°N 2.36968°W	—	Early 19th century (probable)	A cottage orné in rendered brick with a slate roof, a single storey, and a cruciform plan. At the head is a semicircular bay with a conical roof, and the other arms have hipped gables. The windows are casements.	II
Old Market Tavern; 53.38934°N 2.35042°W		Early 19th century	Originally the Unicorn Hotel, the Town Hall was added to the right in 1849, and when this closed it was incorporated into the hotel, later a public house. The building is in brick, mainly rendered, on a stone plinth, with stone dressings and slate roofs. The hotel has three storeys, three bays on the east front, three on the south front, and a two-storey, three-bay rear wing. On the east front is a porch with Tuscan columns, and two gables with pierced bargeboards. The former town hall projects slightly, it has two storeys, three bays, and a hipped roof. On the front is a rusticated ground floor, a carriage entry, and two semicircular-headed windows. On the upper floor is an oriel window above which is a clock tower with a bellcote and a weathervane.	II
The Downs Cottage; 53.38358°N 2.35960°W	—	Early 19th century	A house in pebbledashed brick with a slate roof, two storeys, a double-depth plan, and four bays. In front of the door is a flat canopy on slender columns. The windows are sashes on stone sills.	II
1–11 Sandiway Road; 53.39341°N 2.35195°W	—	c. 1830	A terrace of six brick houses with a dentilled eaves cornice and a slate roof. Each house has two storeys, a double-depth plan, one bay, a doorway with a semicircular head and a fanlight to the left, and a sash window on each floor with a cambered brick arch and a stone sill. At the rear are horizontally-sliding sash windows.	II
Warehouse adjacent to coal wharf 53.39756°N 2.35418°W		1833	The warehouse, with an opening containing a branch of the Bridgewater Canal, is in brick on a stone plinth, with stone dressings, an eaves cornice, a parapet, and roofs of slate and asbestos. It has a square plan with three storeys and five bays. The central bay projects, and has a pediment with a circular opening and a moulded surround, rusticated quoins and voussoirs, and a keystone, above which is a Venetian window with a dated keystone. Elsewhere there are semicircular-headed openings and loading bays with hoist canopies.	II
Downs Place; 53.38366°N 2.35504°W	—	1839	A terrace of four brick houses with a slate roof. They have two storeys and most have two bays. The doorways have fanlights, and some have moulded surrounds. There is one bay window, and the other windows are sashes with stone sills and cambered brick arches. Two of the houses have dormers.	II
13–21 Sandiway Road; 53.39334°N 2.35137°W	—	c. 1840	A terrace of five houses with fronts of yellow brick and a slate roof. Each house has two storeys, a double-depth plan, and one bay apart from No. 17 which has two bays. The houses have a semicircular-headed doorway with an architrave and a fanlight. The windows are sashes with stone sills, on the ground floor they have flat hoods, and on the upper floor they have stone lintels.	II
32 and 34 The Downs; 53.38405°N 2.35365°W	—	c. 1840	A pair of brick houses on a stone plinth, with a modillion eaves cornice and a slate roof. They have two storeys, a double depth plan, a symmetrical front with each house having two bays, and at the rear is a large wing. The central two bays project slightly and each contains a doorway approached by steps with a semi-elliptical fanlight and a dentilled cornice. The windows are sashes with cambered brick arches and stone sills, and on the roof of No.32 is a dormer.	II
Boundary stone 53.38300°N 2.35652°W	—	c. 1840	The boundary stone marks the boundary of the ancient Borough of Altrincham and is set into a wall. It has moulded sides and top, and contains two arched panels. Above the panels is incised "TOWNSHIPS" and an emblem, and the panels are incised respectively with "ALTRINCHAM" and "MASSEY".	II
Victoria Terrace; 53.38394°N 2.35388°W		c. 1840	A terrace of five brick houses with a slate roof. They have two storeys, a double-depth plan, each house has one bays, and there are wings and extensions at the rear. Each house has a doorway to the right with pilasters and a fanlight. The windows are sashes with wedge lintels and stone sills, and there is one dormer.	II
Bowdon Downs Church, schoolroom and lecture hall 53.38273°N 2.35900°W	—	1847–48	Originally a Congregational Church, it was extended in 1868, the lecture room was added in 1882, and the west porch in 1921. The church is in sandstone with a Westmorland slate roof, and consists of a nave, porches, transepts, a school room, and a vestry. The lecture room extends to the southwest. Above the west porch is a five-light Perpendicular window, small canopied niches, and a coped gable with an ornate finial. In the church are three rose windows. The lecture room has one storey, eight bays, three coped gables, and a flèche.	II
Christ Church, Timperley; 53.39012°N 2.31600°W		1848–49	The church was extended in 1864–65, and altered in 1923, and is in Romanesque style. It is in sandstone with a slate roof, and consists of a nave, a porch, north and south transepts, a chancel with an organ chamber and vestry, and a west tower. The tower has three stages, clasping buttresses, dentilled eaves in the bell stage, and a saddleback roof. In the transepts are rose windows.	II
Gatepiers and walls, Timperley Lodge; 53.40487°N 2.34877°W	—	c. 1850	Two pairs of stone gate piers, each pair joined by stone walls with saddleback copings. The piers are about 2.5 metres (8 ft 2 in) tall, and each has a tapered base with a square shaft with raised panels, and is surmounted by a moulded cap with a pediment on each side and a spiked ball finial on top.	II
The Railway Inn public house 53.39970°N 2.35274°W		Mid-19th century	A public house in red and purple brick with a Welsh slate roof, two storeys and three bays. The off-centre doorway has a moulded surround, a semicircular head and a fanlight. The windows are sashes with segmental arched heads.	II
St Margaret's Church; 53.38701°N 2.36206°W		1851–1855	The church was extended to the west in 1923–25. It is in stone with a slate roof, and consists of a nave with a clerestory, north and south aisles, a south porch, north and south transepts, a chancel with a chapel and a vestry, and a tower at the crossing. The transepts have angled buttresses with gablets, and crocketed pinnacles. The tower has two stages, angled buttresses, a clock face, and an embattled parapet.	II*
2 Heald Road and 16 Langham Road; 53.38273°N 2.35900°W	—	c. 1853	A pair of houses in rendered brick with stone dressings and a decorative slate roof. They are in Gothic style, and have two storeys with attics, five bays, small extensions at the rear, and at the left are two further bays and a conservatory. There are three steep gables with decorative bargeboards and finials at the front and rear. In the outer bays are canted bay windows, and in the central bay is an ornate oriel window. There are two porches that have octagonal piers with embattled pedestals, crocketed pinnacles, and an enriched parapet.	II
Bradgate, Holmacre and Suffolk House; 53.38877°N 2.36567°W	—	c. 1860	Originally one house, later divided into three, it is in yellow and pink brick on a plinth, with bands, decorative brickwork, and hipped slate roofs, and is in Italianate style. There are two storeys, attics and a basement, six bays and a three-bay extension. On the front are two canted bay windows and a timber porch. The windows are sashes, some with stone balconies and iron railings. On the left side is a pediment, and at the rear is a three-arch recessed loggia.	II
St John's Church; 53.38271°N 2.35289°W		1865–66	The church, designed by J. Medland Taylor, is in stone and has slate roofs with coped gables. It consists of a nave with a clerestory, north and south aisles, a west porch, north and south transepts, a chancel with a polygonal apse, a vestry and an organ chamber, and southwest steeple. The steeple has a three-stage tower with buttresses, lancet windows, and a broach spire with gabled lucarnes.	II
2, 4, 6 and 8 (part) Kingsway; 53.38864°N 2.35028°W	—	1870	A row of shops with offices above in sandstone, with brick at the rear and in part of the front. It has a sill band, a coped modillion eaves parapet, and a slate roof with four gablets. There are three storeys and eleven bays. On the ground floor are shop fronts in an arcade, the columns having moulded bases and capitals. Four pilasters rise through the full height of the building. On the middle floor are lancet windows with decorative hood moulds, and on the top floor the windows have shouldered heads.	II
Trinity United Reformed Church; 53.38196°N 2.35615°W		1872	Originally a Presbyterian church, later used for other purposes, it is in stone with a slate roof. The church consists of a nave with a clerestory, north and south aisles, a west porch, north and south transepts, a chancel, and a southwest steeple. The steeple has a two-stage tower with angle buttresses, corner canopies with grotesque beasts, and a broach spire with lucarnes.	II
Bank House; 53.38887°N 2.35089°W		1875	Originally Brooke's Bank, it curves around a corner, and has a sandstone ground floor with timber framing above, and a clay tile roof. There are two storeys with attics, four bays, and three unequal gables with bressumers, decorative bargeboards and finials. In the second bay is a double-arched entrance with a balustrade and a balcony above. The first and fourth bays have mullioned and transomed windows on the ground floor and oriel windows on the upper floors and attics. The third bay contains a large two-storey curved bay window with eleven lights. On the roof are Tudor-style chimney stacks and a lead bellcote.	II
Station Hotel; 53.38725°N 2.34870°W		Late 19th century	A public house and shop in red brick with stone dressings, terracotta decoration, and a slate roof. There are three storeys, a double-depth plan, five bays, and rear extensions. The doorway has a pilastered architrave, a moulded cornice, and a fanlight, above which is an oriel window. At the top of the bay is an elaborate shaped gable with a swag, a fluted frieze, and a triangular pediment. To the left of the doorway are two elliptical arched windows, and to the right is a large plate glass window with mullions. The windows on the upper floors are sash windows with aprons and architraves.	II
Market House; 53.38751°N 2.35184°W		1879–80	The market hall is in pink and yellow brick and has a dentilled cornice, a slate roof, and fronts of three and five bays. The three-bay entrance front has a pediment over the central bay containing a clock face, and the outer bays have parapets. Along the sides are pilasters with fluted bases, on the upper parts are lunette windows.	II
Clock tower 53.38745°N 2.34819°W		1880	The clock tower is in the forecourt of Altrincham station. It is in brick on a stone plinth, and has a square plan, three stages, a moulded band, a dog-tooth band, and a cornice on coupled brackets. There is a doorway on the southeast side, and a semicircular-headed window on the other sides in both lower stages, all with stone surrounds and polychromatic voussoirs; the windows are sashes. In the top stage is a clock face on each side, over which are dentilled pediments.	II
1, 1A and 3 Market Street and 2 Post Office Street; 53.38850°N 2.35084°W	—	1890s	Originally an auction house, later shops, on a corner site, with two storeys and attics, four bays on Market Street, two on Post Office Street, and a curved entrance between. The ground floor is in brick with stone dressings, the upper floor has decorative timber framing, and the roof is in clay tiles. The windows are mullioned and transomed, and there are two dormer windows. Above the entrance is a balcony with large stone brackets and cast iron railings, and on the roof is a weathervane.	II
2, 2A, 4 and 4A Old Market Place; 53.38863°N 2.35065°W	—	1890s	Commercial premises on a corner site in brick on a stone plinth, with stone bands, a decorative timber framed eaves band, and a clay tile mansard roof. There are two storeys with attics, five bays on Old Market Place, two on Post Office Street and a curved corner. There is a central recess with doorways and a balcony, flanked on the ground floor by shop fronts. On the upper floor are mullioned and transomed windows, and on the roof are dormers with timber framed gables, decorative bargeboards, and finials. On the roof is a weathervane.	II
Engine house and chimney base, The Linotype Works; 53.39662°N 2.35942°W		1897	The engine house and the chimney were designed by Stott and Sons. The engine house is in polychrome bands of brick with dressings in terracotta and stone, a moulded eaves band, and a slate roof with ball finials. The north gable wall has four bays, a plinth, and pilasters between round-arched windows with moulded impost bands, voussoir bands, and giant keystones, and there is an inserted square-headed entrance. Above is a frieze band with the name of the works in white brick, and at the top is a shaped pediment with the date. The separate chimney base is in brick with stone dressings, and has a high square pedestal, with an entablature, a moulded stone architrave and a cornice. On this is a plinth, and a small engaged pillar at each corner with a shaped cap and a ball finial.	II
Main office block, The Linotype Works; 53.39654°N 2.35819°W		1897	The office block, by Stott and Sons, is in red brick with buff terracotta detailing. It has a symmetrical front, with a main range of two storeys and seven bays flanked by one- and two-storey ranges. The central bay has an entrance with a segmental head and a six-light fanlight, above which is mullioned and transomed window, and a large rectangular tower with a clock face, a frieze, a moulded cornice, an ornamental metal parapet, and a pyramidal spire. The windows on the upper floor are curved with three lights. Between the bays are piers, and above the upper floor is a dentilled cornice and a deep parapet with recessed panels containing white lettering spelling the name of the company and the date.	II
St Alban's Church; 53.40250°N 2.35199°W	—	1900	The church, by Austin and Paley, was extended in 2000. It is in red brick with stone dressings and a clay tile roof. The church consists of a nave with a clerestory, north and south aisles, north and south transepts, a chancel, and a vestry with a pyramidal roof. On the east wall of the north transept is a bellcote with swept coping and grotesque corner figures. The east window has five lights.	II
Lloyds Bank and post office 53.39903°N 2.35262°W	—	1902	The former bank was designed by Thomas Worthington and Son. It has three storeys, four bays, and two rear wings. The ground floor is in ashlar stone, the upper floors are in brick with stone dressings, and the roof is slated with coped gables. On the ground floor are semi-circular arches, in the first bay there is a doorway with a semi-circular arch with a coffered soffit, the middle two bays contain windows, and in the fourth bay is an entrance. On the upper floors the outer bays project and contain cross windows with architraves, and the central bays have two-storey canted bay windows containing mullioned and transomed windows. On the top floor is an elaborate heraldic cartouche.	II
Church of St Vincent de Paul and presbytery 53.38636°N 2.35609°W		1904–05	A Roman Catholic church designed by Edmund Kirby in Early English style, it is in Ruabon brick with terracotta dressings, and has a slate roof. The church consists of a nave with a clerestory, north and south aisles, a west porch, north and south transepts, and a chancel with a polygonal apse. The presbytery is attached to the south corner, it is in similar materials, and has two storeys, a hipped roof, sash windows, a Tudor arched doorway, and decoration in diapering.	II
Stamford House; 53.38695°N 2.34861°W		1904–05	A row of shops with offices above by Charles Henry Heathcote in Edwardian Baroque style on a corner site. It is in red brick with glazed buff terracotta dressings and a mansard roof in green slate. There are three storeys, basements and attics, an L-shaped plan, three bays on each front and a curved bay on the corner. On the ground floor are modern shop fronts, pilasters, a frieze and a cornice, and on the upper floors are giant Ionic pilasters, capitals with foliated pendants, a frieze, and a prominent cornice. The windows are sashes with triple keystones. In the centre of the Stamford New Road front is an open segmental pediment containing a cartouche. On the Moss Lane front is a wagon entry above which are segmental oriel windows and a domed turret, and this is repeated, without the entry, to the south.	II
32–34 Railway Street; 53.38510°N 2.35179°W	—	1906	Built by the Manchester & County Bank and later used for other purposes, the building is in sandstone on a plinth, with a dentilled cornice above the ground floor, two string courses, three storeys, and three bays. In the right bay is an arched doorway with a fanlight, and Tudor roses in the spandrels. The windows are cross-windows. On the upper two floors the central bay is flanked by octagonal pilasters that rise to form pinnacles. Between them at the top is a gable containing a datestone and surmounted by a griffin holding a shield. At the ends of the parapet are gargoyles.	II
Watling Gate; 53.40701°N 2.34226°W	—	c. 1910	A brick house with a stone-slate roof, in the style of a 17th-century hall-house. It has a central range open to the roof, two cross-wings, a single-storey rear wing, and a lean-to canopy along the front. In the left cross-wing are casement windows, and elsewhere the windows are mullioned and transomed or dormers. Inside there is an inglenook fireplace.	II
St Alban's Vicarage; 53.40268°N 2.35237°W	—	1914	The vicarage is in brick with sandstone dressings and a clay tile roof. There are two storeys with attics, and five bays. Above the doorway is a segmental-arched fanlight, the windows are mullioned and transomed, and on the roof is hipped dormer window. The fifth bay is corbelled out at the upper floor. In the left gable end is a two-storey canted bay window, and at the rear are two more dormer windows.	II
Altrincham and Dunham Massey war memorial 53.38608°N 2.36279°W		1920	The war memorial is in Portland stone, and consists of a Celtic cross on a stepped plinth on a wide octagonal dais. The dais has a surrounding wall and two flights of steps with ramped balustrades leading up to it. On the inner face of the wall are seats, and there are two lanterns on slender shafts. On the wall are bronze plaques listing those lost in the World Wars. There is carved interlace decoration on the faces of the cross shaft, and at its foot are two inscribed bronze plaques.	II
