= Thornton-Pickard =

British camera manufacturer

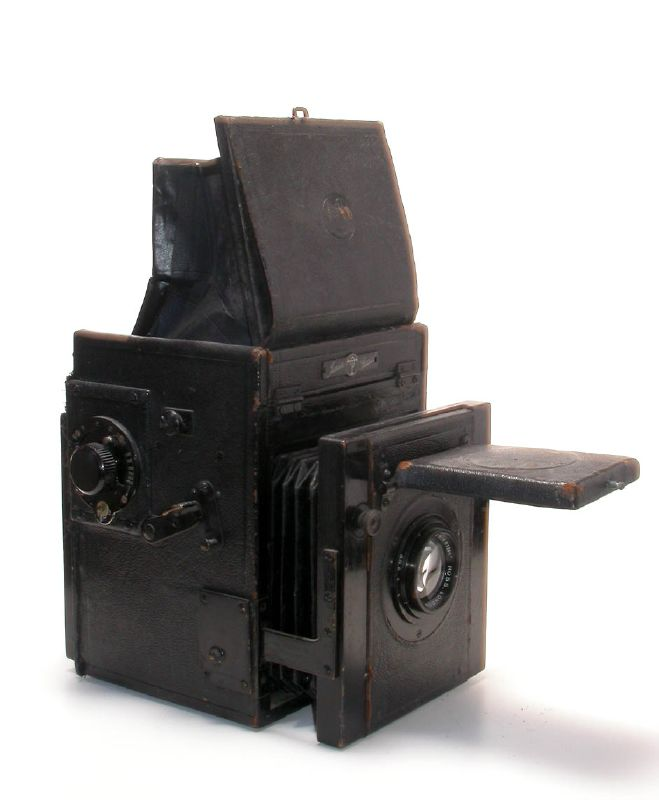
Thornton-Pickard 'Junior Special'

Thornton-Pickard was a British camera manufacturer which operated from 1888 to 1939. The company was based in Altrincham, near Manchester, and was an early pioneer in the development of the camera industry.

== History ==
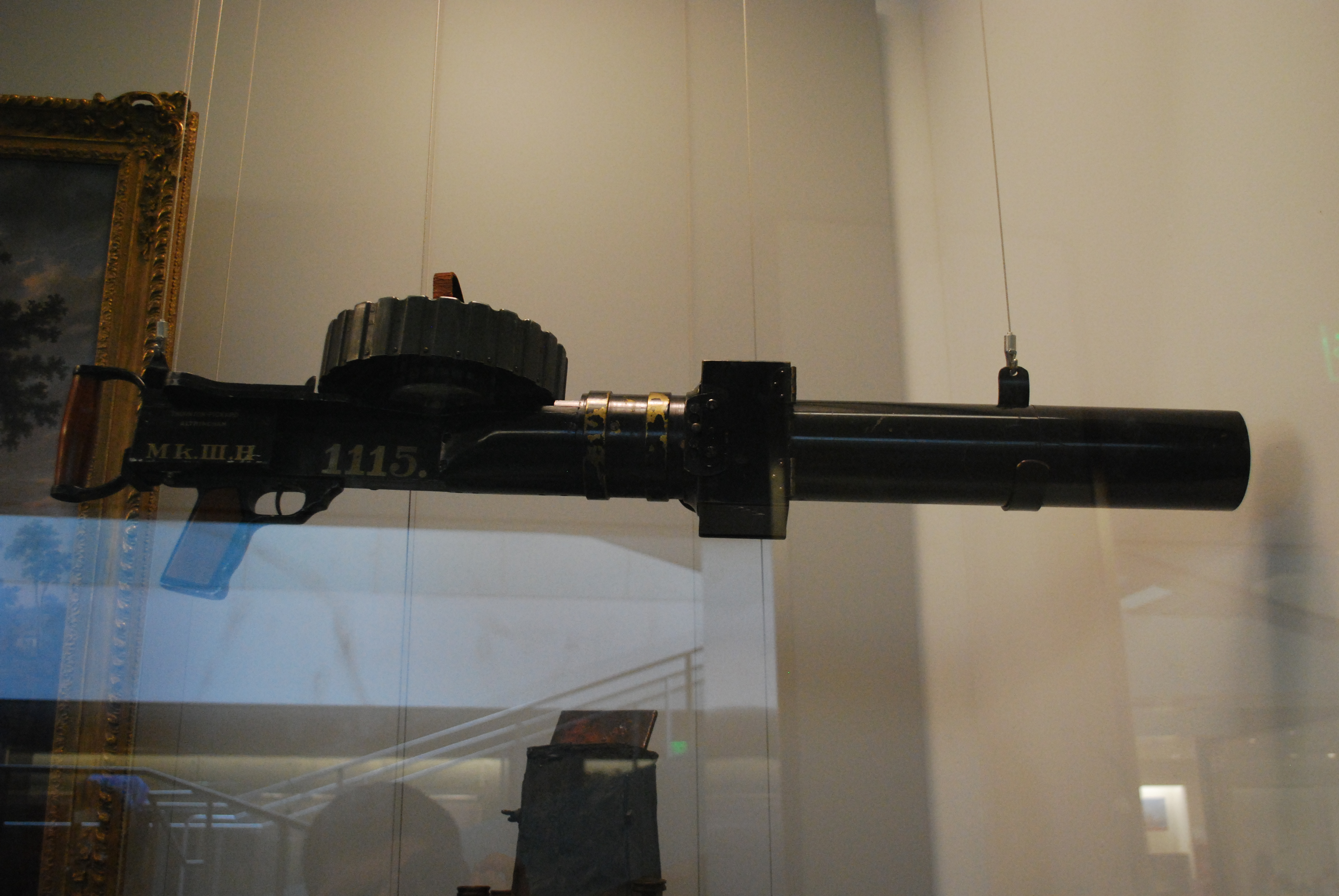
Thornton-Pickard Mark III

The Thornton-Pickard company was founded by John Edward Thornton and Edgar Pickard in Manchester, in 1888. The company moved to a new factory at Broadheath, Altrincham in 1891. The "Time & Instantaneous" shutter was designed and patented by Thornton in 1892. This shutter design was also licensed to a number of other camera makers. Some early cameras produced by the company included the "Ruby" and "Amber" models.

In 1897, the company became a limited company, followed shortly afterwards by the sudden death of Edgar Pickard due to a perforated ulcer. Thornton now found himself in a company dominated by the Pickard family, who he disliked intensely, and shortly afterwards he left. In 1899, he formed a new business partnership with Charles Rothwell, a chemist who shared Thornton's interest in photography. The company was called the Thornton Film Company. In 1913, Thornton emigrated to the United States and went on to patent a three-colour cine film that was manufactured under license by Eastman Kodak. Thornton eventually returned to England, and died some years later in 1940.

Following the loss of its founders, Thornton-Pickard continued to manufacture cameras. The successful "Imperial Triple Extension" model was introduced in 1913 and continued in production until the 1930s. During the First World War, the company produced a number of cameras for military use, including the Mark III Hythe gun camera. In 1921, the company merged with several others to form Amalgamated Photographic Manufacturers. Throughout the 1920s and 1930s, the company found it increasingly difficult to compete with cheaper imported cameras, and ceased trading in 1939.
