= Broadheath, Greater Manchester =

Town in Altrincham, Greater Manchester, England

Coordinates: 53°24′N 2°21′W

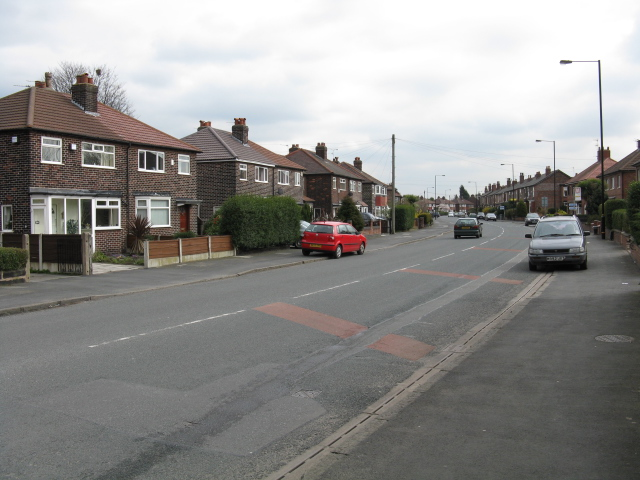

Broadheath is a town in Altrincham, Greater Manchester, England. Historically part of Cheshire, it had a population at the 2011 census of 12,538.

== Industry ==
At Broadheath's height as an industrial area, its industries supported at most 12,000 employees. Over the years most of those manufacturing companies have either closed or relocated. Famous companies that used to be based in Broadheath include the machine tool manufacturers George Richards, H. W. Kearns, and Churchill. Other companies include Budenberg, Linotype, Luke & Spencer, H. F. O'Brien, Wheelabrator Tilghman, Record Electrical, and Thornton-Pickard.

== Governance ==
Broadheath is part of Trafford Metropolitan Borough of Greater Manchester. The ward of Broadheath has three out of sixty three seats on Trafford Metropolitan Borough Council, and as of the 2014 local elections all three seats were held by the Labour Party. In May 2015 Stephen Anstee was voted in Conservative. Amy Whyte Labour was voted in May 2017. The councillors representing Broadheath on Trafford Council are Kaushik Chakraborty, Ulrich Savary, and Amy Whyte.

Since 1997, Broadheath has formed part of the Altrincham and Sale West Constituency, before that it was encompassed by the Altrincham and Sale constituency. Since 2024 it had been represented in the House of Commons by Connor Rand, of the Labour Party.

== Schools ==
Broadheath Primary School.

Preschool Stamford Brook Preschool.

== Churches ==
St Alban's Church, Broadheath.

== Transport ==
Broadheath railway station served the district between 1853 and closure in 1962. Passenger trains ran from Manchester via Sale to Broadheath and on to Lymm and Warrington.

== See also ==
- Listed buildings in Altrincham

Broadheath Community Hall Www.broadheathcommunityhall.co.uk
