= Budenberg Gauge Company =

Defunct German gauge company

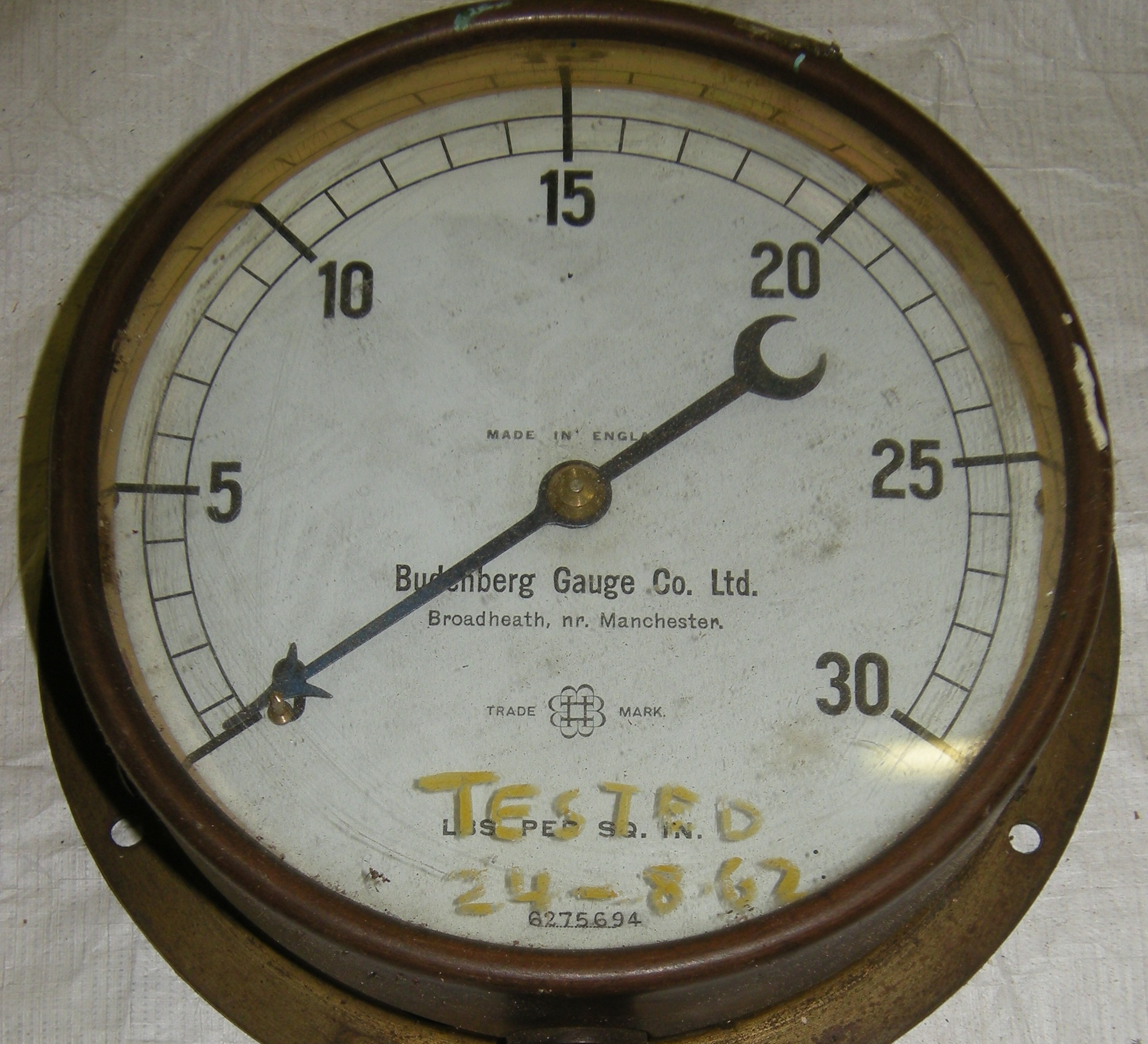
1950s Budenberg pressure gauge showing pounds per square inch

The Budenberg Gauge Company was founded in 1918. The original parent company was Schäffer & Budenberg founded in 1850 by Bernhard Schäffer and Christian Friedrich Budenberg in Prussia. The Budenberg Gauge Company is now based in Broadheath, Greater Manchester. The company is renowned for the manufacture of high quality pressure gauges, thermometers, valves and manifolds. Budenberg also produce monoflanges and close coupled systems, chemical seals, hygienic seals, and transmitters.

== Early history ==
In 1849, B. Schäffer patented the design of a diaphragm pressure gauge. The following year he formed a business partnership with his brother-in-law C.F. Budenberg, The Schäffer & Budenberg Machinery & Boiler Fittings Company, in the altstadt of the Prussian town of Magdeburg Germany. They began manufacturing pressure gauges and all items relating the steam industry. In 1858 they moved to purpose-built premises on Schoenebecker Strasse in the suburb of Buckau. The company became known by the shorter name of The Schäffer & Budenberg Manufacturing Company (S&B) "a special factory for the production of fine mechanical instruments". However, locally in Buckau they were always known as 'Schäffers'. Export success on the back of the ever increasing steam industry led to the formation of manufacturing and sales subsidiaries all over the world. In c1875 the company produced its first Bourdon type pressure gauges thanks to the expiry of patents. They opened American Schäffer & Budenberg office & factory in Brooklyn, New York in 1876, and briefly a second factory in Foxboro, Massachusetts. They had 5 factories, 4 depots, 25 offices and numerous agencies over five continents by the beginning of WWI employing nearly 8,000.

== The Manchester connection ==
The company's history in Manchester began in 1855 when Arnold Budenberg, the younger brother of C.F. Budenberg, established a sales office in St. Mary's Gate. A Glasgow office opened in Hope Street in 1861. In 1876 the assembly of pressure gauges and other instruments began in Manchester. Arnold's son Fred Budenberg took over the running of the Manchester operation in 1888. The company continued to expand and relocated to a larger factory in Whitworth Street in 1896. In the decades running up to the First World War and the race for naval superiority, products had to be made in Britain if the company wanted to sell to the British Admiralty. To cement this the company was registered as British in 1902, even though it was still almost completely owned and controlled from Germany.

== First World War ==
In 1914, the company moved from Whitworth Street to a new purpose-built factory at Woodfield Road, Broadheath, Altrincham. Following the outbreak of war with Germany, Schaeffer & Budenberg was one of many German owned companies in the United Kingdom to be expropriated by the British Crown. Following the seizure of the company's Manchester subsidiary, Fred Budenberg (who was British born), was ordered to continue to run the business by the British Government for the duration of the war. Both of Fred's sons were fighting for the British in France. In 1917 Fred bought the company back from the British Crown, with the proviso by the Crown that all Board Directors were English born, and so the Budenberg Gauge Company Ltd. was formed and shares were held by a Public Trustee. The American branch was taken over by the Alien Property Custodian in 1917 and sold off in May 1919 to the American Gauge and Valve Co, with no continuing family connection, although it continued to operate as an independent entity until 1923. American Gauge was then bought by Manning Maxwell Moore and S&B continued as a separate division, even though sometimes working from the same premises. The Italian branch was liquidated by the Italian Government in 1915. The company business connections in St. Petersburg, Riga, Moscow, Vladivostok and Kiev were severed with the war and the Russian Revolution. The South American agencies stayed connected with the German company. The French and Belgian offices continued to operate by the Germans during the war. The Swedish and Swiss offices continued in a lesser way in neutral territories. The Polish, Czech and Austrian factories continued to operate as they were essential to the German war effort. The Warsaw factory ceased operations at the end of 1918, but there was a factory at Lodz at one period. A new office started in The Hague in 1918, and the offices in Lille and Liege continued after the war. During the huge inflation of 1923 in Germany the factory had problems with output and cash flow. Hitler's early preparations for the 1939-1945 war ensured the Germany company's existence and growth. During the Second World War the Magdeburg-Buckau factory was badly bombed and 60% of it was destroyed. It continued to operate under the Schaeffer & Budenberg name until 1946 when it was taken over and run by the Soviets as a form of war reparation. Its name was changed to the Karl Marx Messgeräte & Armaturenwerke in the newly communist East Germany. The British company, Budenberg Gauge continued to provide gauges for all areas of pressure work and flourished after a slow period in the 1950s due to the inability to source raw materials post WWII.

== Later history ==
In 1961 the individual states agencies for Australia came back under Budenberg Gauge Co., and Budenberg Australia Pty Ltd was set up with a factory in Melbourne. Two years later a third factory was opened in Amlwch, Anglesey. Budenberg Gauge remained a family-owned company from its inception in 1850 until 1991 when it was sold to Burnfield plc.
In 2002 the company vacated its historic Broadheath factory and moved to Irlam, where it continued to manufacture pressure gauges and accessories until 2020. In 2020 Budenberg moved back to Broadheath, Altrincham after an absence of almost 20 years. Now housed in a purpose-built unit which includes a machine shop, assembly and calibration facilities and three new laboratories.

In 1996 DH-Budenberg was established from the merger of Desgranges & Huot from France (known widely as "DH") and the calibration division of Budenberg Gauge Co. Budenberg had been manufacturing pressure calibration equipment - deadweight testers and calibrators - since the 1920s. The newly formed company DH-Budenberg Group has since expanded the calibration equipment produced, to a wide range of primary standard & premium industrial pressure calibration equipment, which now includes: automated primary pressure standards, manual primary standards, differential primary standards, automatic pressure controllers, hydraulic, pneumatic, and portable deadweight testers, and a range of portable calibrators. Along with manufacturing bases in Manchester UK, Paris France & Rodgau Germany, recent DH-Budenberg expansion has included opening new offices in San Marcos - Texas, Dubai - UAE, Chennai - India, Singapore, & Perth - Australia.
