= Goose (disambiguation) =

Geese are waterfowl of the family Anatidae.

Goose or geese may also refer to:

== Birds ==
- One of several wild bird species in the family Anatidae:
  - Magpie goose, in the closely related family Anseranatidae
  - Pygmy goose, in the genus Nettapus in the subfamily Anatinae
  - Spur-winged goose, in the subfamily Plectropterinae
  - Sheldgoose, in the subfamily Tadorninae
- Domestic goose, domesticated varieties of either Greylag Goose or Swan Goose

== Food ==
- Goose as food

== People ==
- Goose (nickname), a list of people nicknamed Goose or the Goose
- Claire Goose (born 1975), British actress
- Roscoe Goose (1891–1971), American jockey
- Goose Van Schaick (1736–1789), Continental Army officer during the American Revolutionary War

== Places ==
- Gaasefjord, meaning "Goose Fjord", a fjord in Eastern Greenland
- Goose (Otter Creek), a water aerodrome in Newfoundland and Labrador, Canada
- Goose Green or Goose, a hamlet in the Falkland Islands

== Arts, entertainment, and media ==
- Goose (American band), an American jam band
- Goose (Belgian band), a Belgian electro rock band
- Geese (band), an American band
- Game of the Goose, a prototype for many commercial European racing board games
- Goosed (1999), an American film starring Jennifer Tilly
- The Snow Goose (novella), by the American author Paul Gallico, first published in 1940 about the Dunkirk Evacuation
- Gus Goose, a fictional Walt Disney character
- "The Goose", a song by funk band Parliament
- The Goose, a character from the television show Just Jordan
- Goose, a character in the animated series Adventure Time
- Goose, a chicken villager from the video game series Animal Crossing
- Goose! (alternately known as Goose on the Loose), a 2006 film starring Chevy Chase
- "Goose", a season 2 episode from Servant
- Geese Howard, a character from the Fatal Fury video game series
- Goose, a character from the Top Gun franchise

== Other uses ==
- GOOSE (Generic Object Oriented Substation Event), abstract data model mappings in the IEC 61850 communication protocol
- Tailor's goose, a type of clothing iron
- Grumman G-21 Goose, an amphibious flying boat
- XSM-73 Goose, American decoy cruise missile

== See also ==
- Father Goose (disambiguation)
- Guus, a common Dutch given name
- Mother Goose (disambiguation)
- Goose Creek (disambiguation)
- Goose Green (disambiguation)
- Goose Island (disambiguation)
- Goose Lake (disambiguation)
- Goose Pond (disambiguation)
