= Altrincham =

Town in Greater Manchester, England

Coordinates: 53.3838°N 2.3547°W

- Town
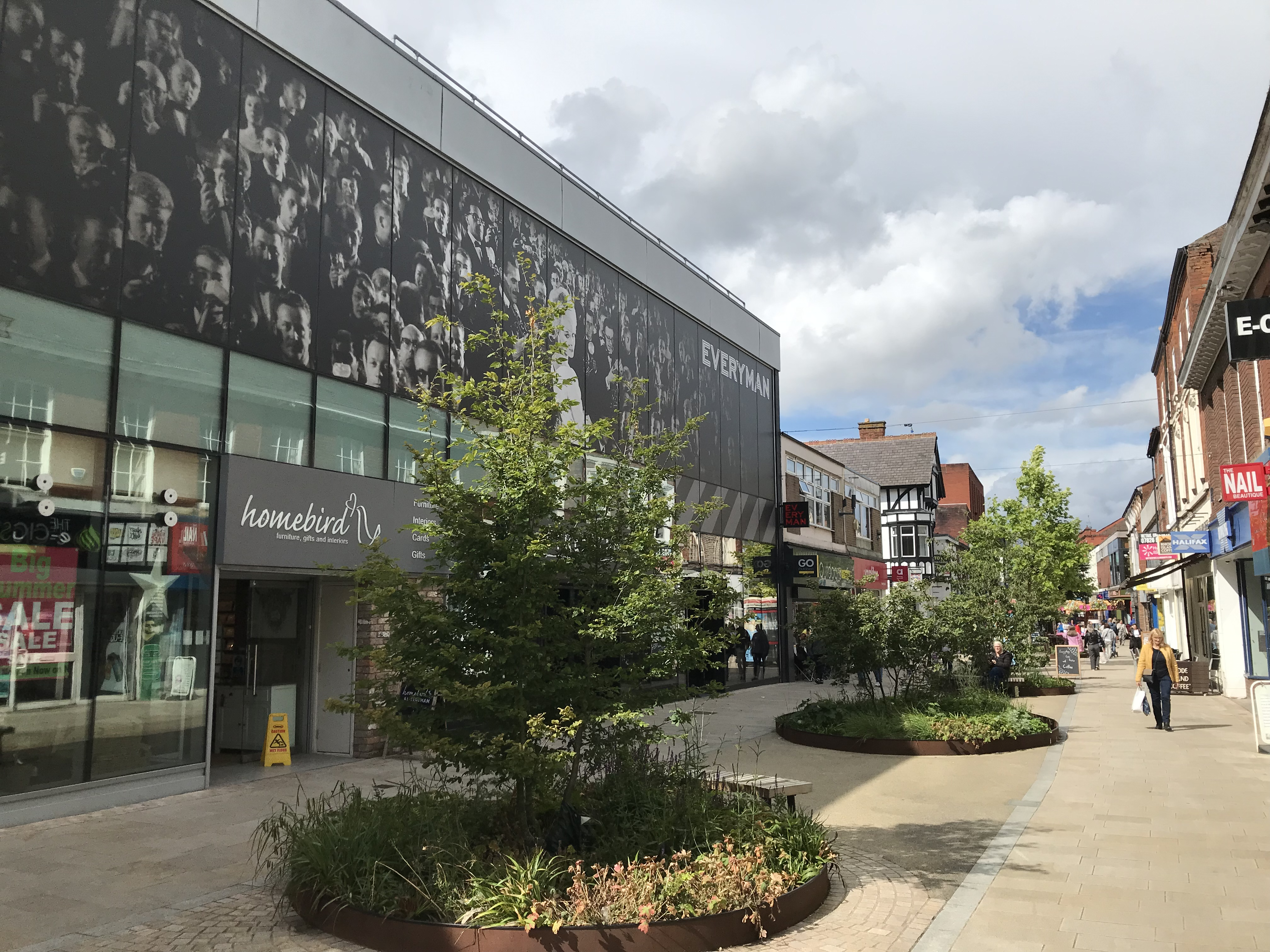
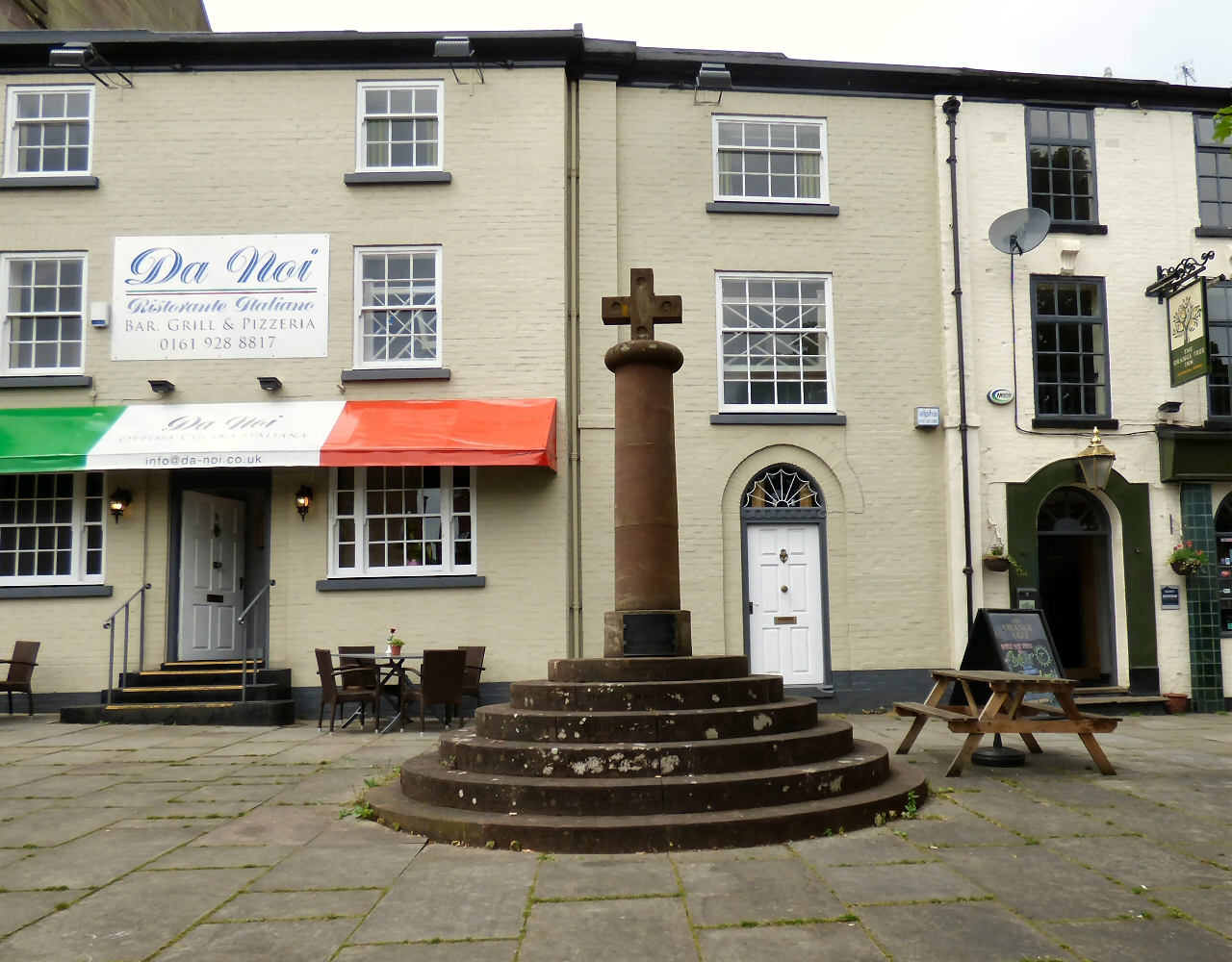
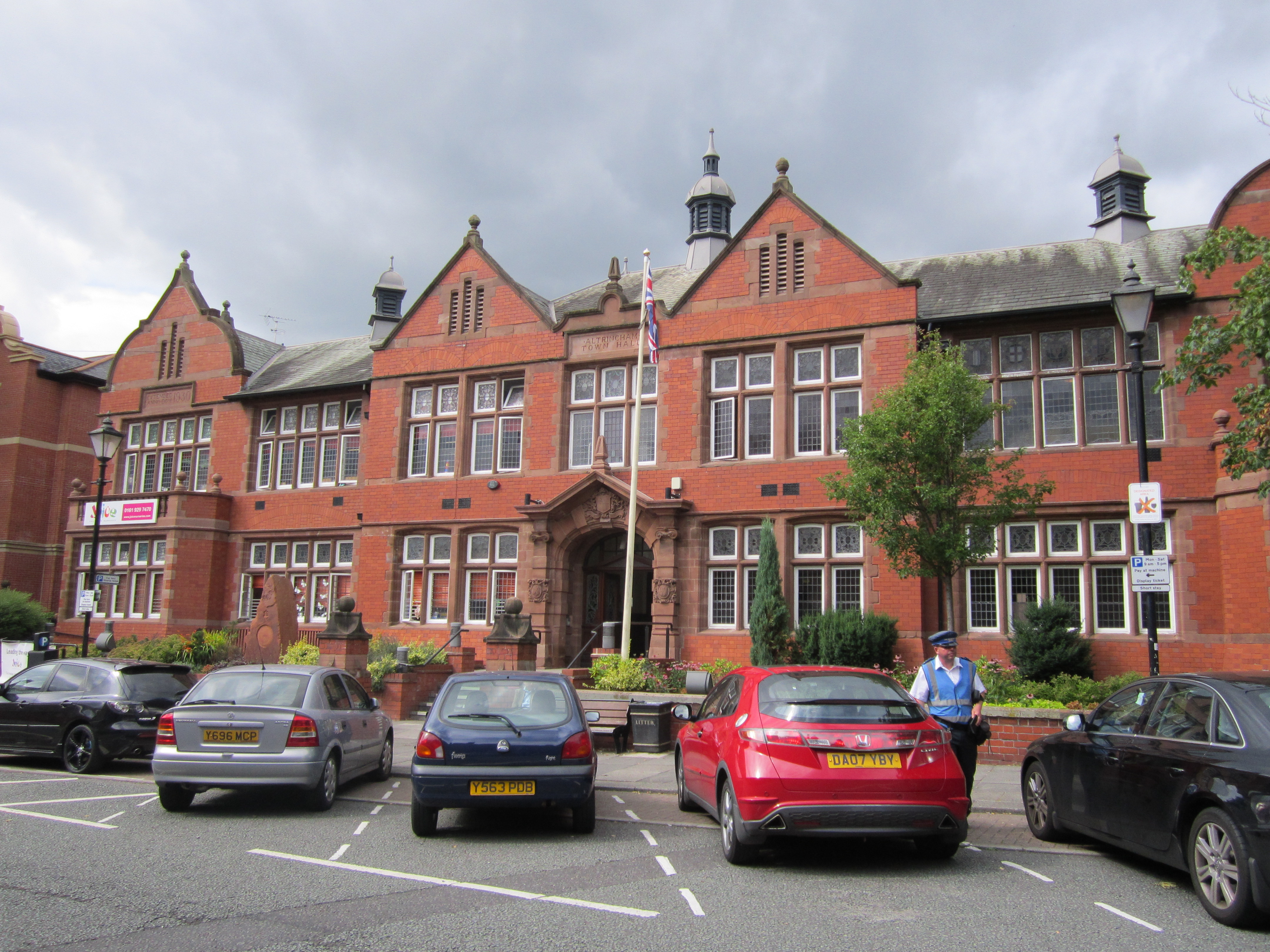
- Clockwise from the top: Town Square, Old Town Hall and The Market Cross in Old Market Place

- Location within Greater Manchester
- Population: 49,680 (Built up area, 2021)
  - Density: 10,272/sq mi (3,966/km^{2})
- OS grid reference: SJ765875
  - London: 161 mi (259 km) SE
- Metropolitan borough: Trafford
- Metropolitan county: Greater Manchester
- Region: North West
- Country: England
- Sovereign state: United Kingdom
- Post town: ALTRINCHAM
- Postcode district: WA14, WA15
- Dialling code: 0161
- Police: Greater Manchester
- Fire: Greater Manchester
- Ambulance: North West
- UK Parliament: Altrincham and Sale West

Altrincham (/ˈɒltrɪŋəm/ OL-tring-əm, locally /ˈɒltrɪŋɡəm/ (Note: Note that neither of these pronunciations includes the sound /tʃ/ suggested by the spelling.)) is a market town in the Metropolitan Borough of Trafford, Greater Manchester, England. It is located south of the River Mersey, 8 miles (13 km) south-west of Manchester, 3 miles (5 km) south-west of Sale and 10 miles (16 km) east of Warrington. At the 2021 census, the built up area had a population of 49,680.

It lies within the historic county boundaries of Cheshire and became part of Greater Manchester in 1974. Altrincham developed as a market town following the right to hold a market being granted in 1290; the market continues today. Further socioeconomic development came with the extension of the Bridgewater Canal to Altrincham in 1765 and the arrival of the railway in 1849, stimulating industrial activity in the town. Outlying villages were absorbed by Altrincham's subsequent growth, along with the grounds of Dunham Massey Hall, formerly the home of the Earl of Stamford and now a tourist attraction, with three Grade I listed buildings and a deer park.

Altrincham has good transport links to Manchester, Sale, Stretford and Stockport, among other destinations. The town has a strong middle-class presence; there has been a steady increase in Altrincham's middle classes since the 19th century. It is also home to Altrincham F.C. and three ice hockey clubs: Manchester Storm, Altrincham Aces and Trafford Tornados.

== History ==
Local evidence of prehistoric human activity exists in the form of two Neolithic arrowheads found in Altrincham and, further afield, a concentration of artefacts around Dunham. The remains of a Roman road, part of one of the major Roman roads in North West England connecting the legionary fortresses of Chester (Deva Victrix) and York (Eboracum), run through the Broadheath area. As it shows signs of having been repaired, the road was in use for a considerable period of time. The town's name first appears as Aldringeham, probably meaning "homestead of Aldhere's people". As recently as the 19th century, it was spelt both Altrincham and Altringham.

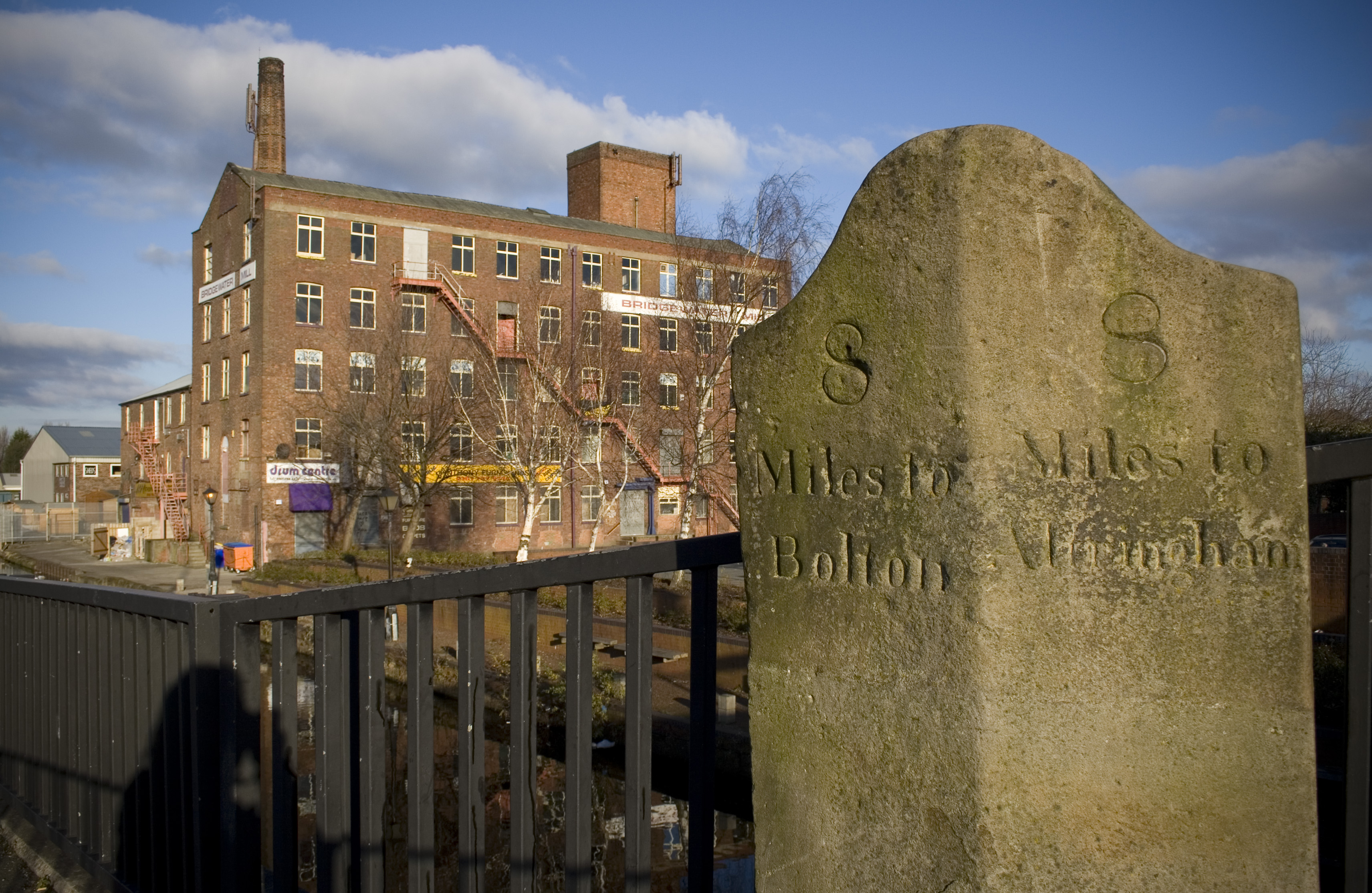
A milestone along the Barton Bridge and Moses Gate turnpike road near Eccles, showing the spelling of Altringham

Until the Normans invaded England, the manors surrounding Altrincham were owned by the Saxon thegn Alweard; after the invasion they became the property of Hamon de Massey, though Altrincham is not mentioned in the Domesday Book of 1086. The earliest documented reference to the town is from 1290, when it was granted its charter as a 'free borough' by Baron Hamon de Massey V. The charter, which still exists and is held by Trafford Council, allowed a weekly market to be held, and it is possible that de Massey established the town to generate income through taxes on trade and tolls. Altrincham was probably chosen as the site of the planned town rather than Dunham, which would have been protected by Dunham Castle, because its good access to roads was important for trade.

Altrincham Fair became St James's Fair, or Samjam, in 1319 and continued until 1895. Fair days had their own court of Pye Powder (a corruption of the French for "dusty feet"), presided over by the mayor and held to settle disputes arising from the day's dealings. By 1348, the town had 120 burgage plots (ownership of land used as a measure of status and importance in an area), putting it on a par with the Cheshire town of Macclesfield, and above Stockport and Knutsford. The earliest known residence in Altrincham was the Knoll, on Stamford Street near the centre of the medieval town. A 1983 excavation on the demolished building, made by South Trafford Archaeological Group, discovered evidence that the house dated from the 13th or 14th century and that it may have contained a drying kiln or malting floor. During the English Civil War, men from Altrincham fought for the Parliamentarian Sir George Booth. During the war, armies camped on nearby Bowdon Downs on several occasions.

In 1754, a stretch of road south of Altrincham, along the Manchester to Chester route, was turnpiked. Turnpikes were toll roads which taxed passengers for the maintenance of the road. Further sections were turnpiked in 1765 from Timperley to Sale, and 1821 from Altrincham to Stockport. The maintenance of roads passed to local authorities in 1888, although by then most turnpike trusts had already declined. The connection of the Bridgewater Canal to Altrincham in 1765 stimulated the development of market gardening, and for many years Altrincham was noted for its vegetables. By 1767, warehouses had been built alongside the canal at Broadheath, the first step in the development of Broadheath as an industrial area and the beginning of Altrincham's industrialisation. The canal was connected in 1776 to the River Mersey, providing the town not only with a water route to Manchester, but also to the Irish Sea.

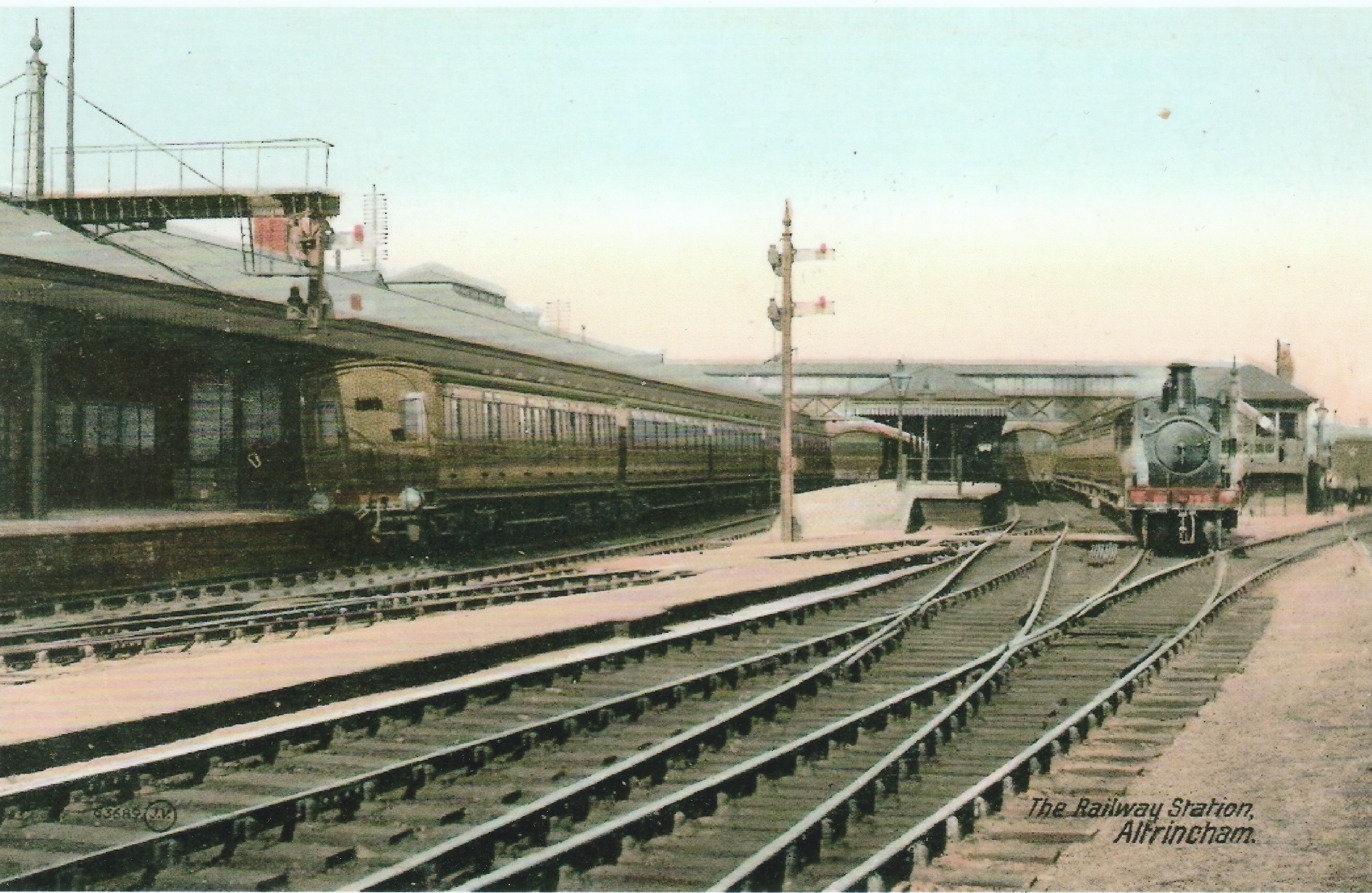
Postcard of Altrincham railway station

Moves to connect the town to the UK's railway network gained pace in 1845, when the Act of Parliament for the construction of the Manchester, South Junction and Altrincham Railway (MSJAR) was passed. The first train left Altrincham early on 20 July 1849, carrying 65 passengers. The MSJAR had two stations in the town: Altrincham, on Stockport Road, and Bowdon, though not actually in Bowdon, but on Lloyd Street/Railway Street. Both were replaced in 1881 by Altrincham & Bowdon station on Stamford New Road.

Broadheath railway station served the northern part of Altrincham between 1853 and 1962, on the London and North Western Railway's line from Manchester London Road to Warrington Bank Quay, via Lymm. A further connection was created on 12 May 1862 by the Cheshire Midland Railway (later the Cheshire Lines Committee), which opened its line from Altrincham to Knutsford.

With its new railway links, Altrincham and the surrounding areas became desirable places for the middle classes and commuters to live. Professionals and industrialists moved to the town, commuting into Manchester. While some travelled daily by coach, the less well–to–do commuted by express or "flyer" barges from Broadheath. Between 1851 and 1881, the population increased from 4,488 to 11,250. Broadheath's industrial area, covering about 250 acres (1.0 km^{2}), was founded in 1885 by Harry Grey, 8th Earl of Stamford, to attract businesses. By 1900 Broadheath had its own docks, warehouses and electricity generating station. The site's proximity to rail, canal and road links proved attractive to companies making machine tools, cameras and grinding machines. The presence of companies like Tilghmans Sand Blast, and the Linotype and Machinery Company, established Broadheath as an industrial area of national standing. By 1914, 14 companies operated in Broadheath, employing thousands of workers. One of those was the Budenberg Gauge Company. Linotype also created 172 workers' homes near its factory, helping cater for the population boom created by Broadheath's industrialisation. Between 1891 and 1901, the population of Altrincham increased by 35%, from 12,440 to 16,831.

From the turn of the 20th century to the start of the Second World War, there were few changes in Altrincham. Although the town was witness to some of the Luftwaffe's raids on the Manchester area in the latter war, it emerged from the war relatively unscathed having lost only 23 civilian residents through enemy action, and, as with the rest of Britain, experienced an economic boom. This manifested itself in the construction of new housing and the 1960s rebuilding of the town centre; however, during the 1970s, employment at Broadheath declined by nearly 40%.

The railway line to Manchester was renovated in the early 1990s to form part of the Manchester Metrolink light rail system.

== Governance ==
There is one main tier of local government covering Altrincham at metropolitan borough level, Trafford Council. The council is a member of the Greater Manchester Combined Authority, which is led by the directly-elected Mayor of Greater Manchester.

=== Administrative history ===
Arms of the former Altrincham Borough Council

Altrincham was historically a township in the ancient parish of Bowdon, which formed part of the Bucklow Hundred of Cheshire.

From the 17th century onwards, parishes were gradually given various civil functions under the poor laws, in addition to their original ecclesiastical functions. In some cases, including Bowdon, the civil functions were exercised by each township separately rather than the parish as a whole. In 1866, the legal definition of 'parish' was changed to be the areas used for administering the poor laws, and so Altrincham became a civil parish. In ecclesiastical terms, Altrincham became a chapelry in 1799 after St George's Church was built as a chapel of ease to St Mary's, Bowdon. Altrincham subsequently became its own ecclesiastical parish separate from Bowdon in 1860.

Altrincham was granted a charter in June 1290 by the Lord of the manor, Hamon de Massey V. The charter allowed for the creation of a merchants' guild, run by the town's burgesses, to tax people passing through the borough and to regulate the market. Burgesses were free men who lived in the town. The borough was ruled by a court leet and elected a mayor from at least 1452. Amongst the court's responsibilities were keeping the public peace and regulating the markets and fairs. Although described as a 'free borough', a government survey of boroughs in 1835 found that in practice the town was a seigneurial borough, remaining subservient to the lord of the manor, with the borough authorities having very few functions. The borough was therefore left unreformed when the Municipal Corporations Act 1835 reformed most ancient boroughs across the country into municipal boroughs.

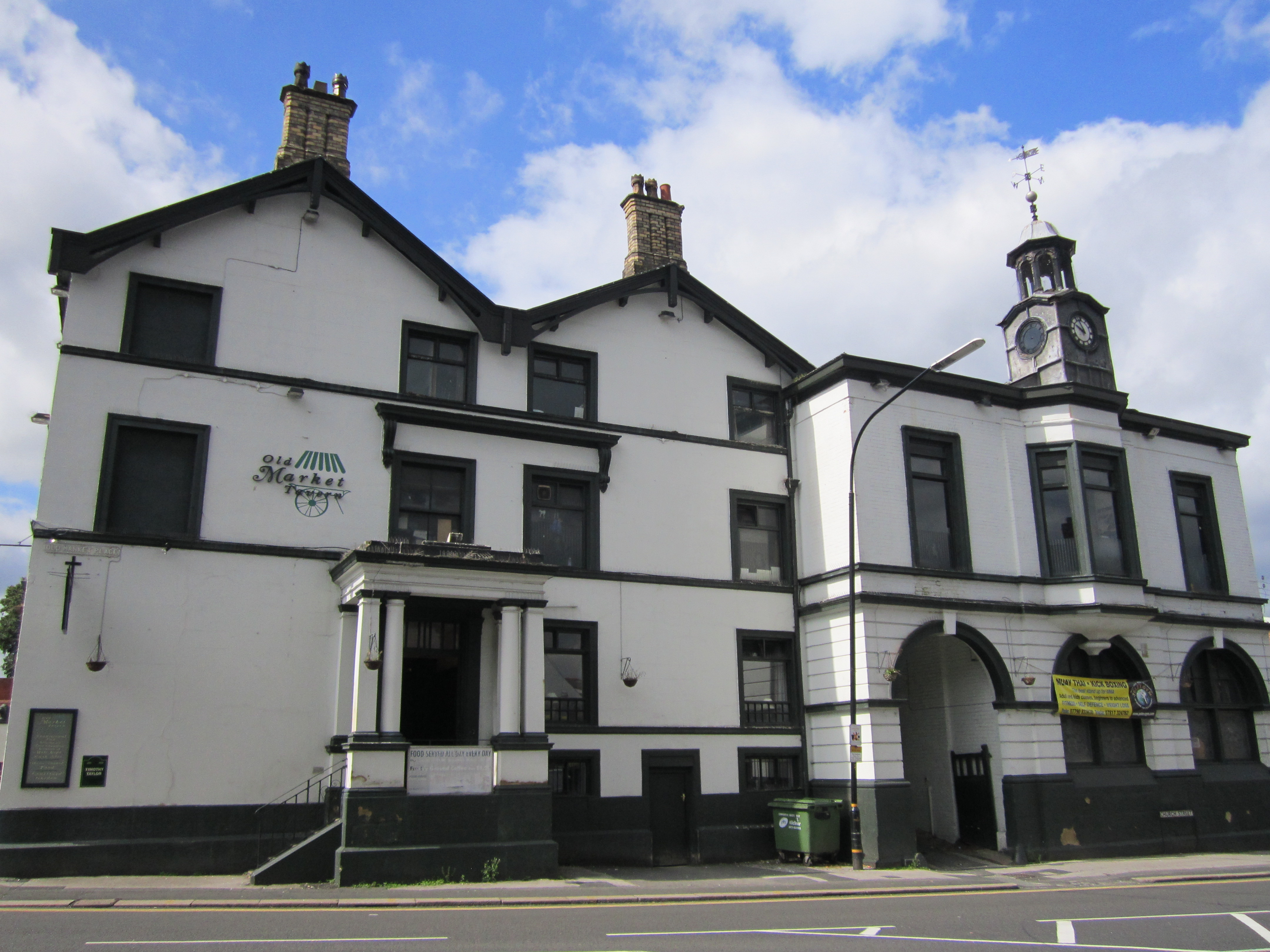
Old Market Tavern, incorporating the former Town Hall of 1849 (right)

As such, the old borough authorities continued to exist with the few functions they had, but were ineligible to take on any new powers. A new town hall was built on Church Street in 1849, commissioned by George Grey, 7th Earl of Stamford, as lord of the manor, for holding the court leet and other public meetings. It replaced an earlier town hall which had stood in the middle of Old Market Place. In order to provide more modern local government functions, the Altrincham township was made a local board district in 1851, administered by an elected local board with powers including the provision of sewers and water supply, overseeing public health, and other functions. From 1851 to 1886, the old borough and its officers existed alongside the local board. In 1886, the old borough was finally abolished. In recognition of the fact that Altrincham's mayor had been a purely honorary position for many years, the court leet was allowed to continue to appoint an honorary mayor, but with no powers or jurisdiction.

Local board districts were reconstituted as urban districts under the Local Government Act 1894. A new Altrincham Town Hall on Market Street was commissioned for the urban district council. It was designed by Charles Albert Hindle and was completed in November 1901. Altrincham Urban District was expanded in 1920 when parts of Carrington and Dunham Massey civil parishes were added. A further expansion took place in 1936 when Timperley civil parish was abolished and most of its area incorporated into Altrincham Urban District. At the same time, there was a minor exchange of areas with Hale Urban District; a minor addition from Bowdon Urban District; and a further substantial portion of Dunham Massey civil parish was added. In 1937, the Altrincham Urban District was incorporated to become a municipal borough. The new borough was granted a coat of arms, which featured heraldic references to the Masseys and Earls of Stamford.

The Municipal Borough of Altrincham was abolished in 1974 under the Local Government Act 1972. The area became part of the Metropolitan Borough of Trafford, in Greater Manchester.

For parliamentary representation, an Altrincham constituency was created in 1885; it was replaced by the Altrincham and Sale constituency in 1945 and became part of the newly-created constituency of Altrincham and Sale West. Since 2024, the area has been represented in the House of Commons by the Labour MP, Connor Rand.

== Geography ==
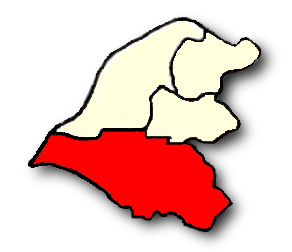
The Metropolitan Borough of Trafford, highlighting the Altrincham area in red

Altrincham lies on the south-western edge of the Greater Manchester Urban Area, immediately south of Sale and 8 miles (13 km) south-west of Manchester city centre. It lies in the north-west corner of the Cheshire Plain, just south of the River Mersey. The Bridgewater Canal passes through the Broadheath area of the town. Altrincham's drinking water is supplied by United Utilities. The local bedrock consists mainly of Keuper Waterstone, a type of sandstone, and water retrieved from those rocks is very hard and often saline, making it undrinkable. The town's climate is generally temperate, with few extremes of temperature or weather. The mean temperature is slightly above average for the United Kingdom, whereas both annual rainfall and average hours of sunshine are slightly below the average for the UK.

Along with Sale, Stretford and Urmston, Altrincham is one of the four major urban areas in Trafford. The Altrincham area, as defined by Trafford Council, comprises the south of Trafford. In addition to the town of Altrincham, it includes the villages of Timperley, Bowdon, Hale and Hale Barns. The Broadheath area of the town was a light industrial centre until the 1970s and is now a retail park. The most densely populated part of the town is around the town centre, with the less populated areas and more green space further from the centre of town in villages such as Bowdon and Hale. The Oldfield Brow area lies on the outskirts of the town beside the Bridgewater Canal and close to Dunham Massey.

== Demography ==
Ethnicity: Altrincham compared
2011 UK Census	Altrincham	Trafford	England
Total population	52,419	226,578	53,012,456
White	91.6%	85.5%	85.4%
Asian	4.9%	7.9%	7.8%
Mixed	2.0%	2.7%	2.3%
Black	0.8%	2.9%	3.5%
Other	0.7%	1.0%	1.0%

As of the 2011 UK census, the town of Altrincham had a total population of 52,419. Of its 41,530 residents aged 16 and over, 62.1% were co-habiting couples. The town's population density is 37.4 inhabitants per hectare, with the population consisting of 49% males and 51% females. Of those aged 16 and over, 15.2% had no academic qualifications, similar to the 18.6% in all of Trafford. At 8.4%, Altrincham has a low proportion of non-white people. Asians are the area's largest ethnic minority, at 4.9% of the population.

In 1931, 14.6% of Altrincham's population was middle class, slightly higher than the figure for England and Wales, which was 14%. By 1971, this gap had increased to 28.8% compared to 24% nationally, while the town's working class population had declined, from 30.3% in 1931 (36% in England and Wales) to 18.6% (26% nationwide). The remainder comprised clerical and skilled manual workers. This change in social structure was similar to that seen across the nation, although biased towards the middle classes, making Altrincham the middle-class town it is today.

=== Population change ===
According to the hearth tax returns from 1664, the township of Altrincham had a population of about 636, making it the largest of the local settlements; this had increased to 1,692 in 1801. In the first half of the 19th century, the town's population increased by 165%, higher than 89% across England and 98% in the Trafford area. The growth of the settlement was a result of the Industrial Revolution and, although Altrincham was one of the fastest-growing townships in the Trafford area, but paled in comparison to new industrial areas such as Ashton-under-Lyne, Hyde and Manchester. In the second half of the 19th century, Altrincham's population grew by 275%, higher than the 235% for Trafford and 69% nationally in the same period. This was due to the late industrialisation of the area and the introduction of the Manchester South Junction and Altrincham Railway in 1849.

Population growth in Altrincham since 1801

Year	Pop.	±%
1801	1,692	—
1811	2,032	+20.1%
1821	2,302	+13.3%
1831	2,708	+17.6%
1841	3,399	+25.5%
1851	4,488	+32.0%

Year	Pop.	±%
1861	6,628	+47.7%
1871	8,478	+27.9%
1881	11,250	+32.7%
1891	12,440	+10.6%
1901	16,831	+35.3%
1911	17,813	+5.8%

Year	Pop.	±%
1921	20,450	+14.8%
1931	21,356	+4.4%
1941	39,940	+87.0%
1951	39,789	−0.4%
1961	41,122	+3.4%
1971	40,786	−0.8%

Year	Pop.	±%
1981	39,693	−2.7%
1991	40,042	+0.9%
2001	40,695	+1.6%
2011	52,419	+28.8%
2021	49,680	−5.2%

Source: A Vision of Britain through Time

== Economy ==
Working age population: Altrincham compared
2011 UK Census	Altrincham	Trafford	England
Population aged 16–74	37,743	162,806	38,881,374
Full-time employment	43.4%	41.9%	38.6%
Part-time employment	13.9%	14.0%	13.7%
Self-employed	11.5%	9.7%	9.8%
Unemployed	3.1%	3.8%	4.4%
Retired	13.5%	13.3%	13.7%

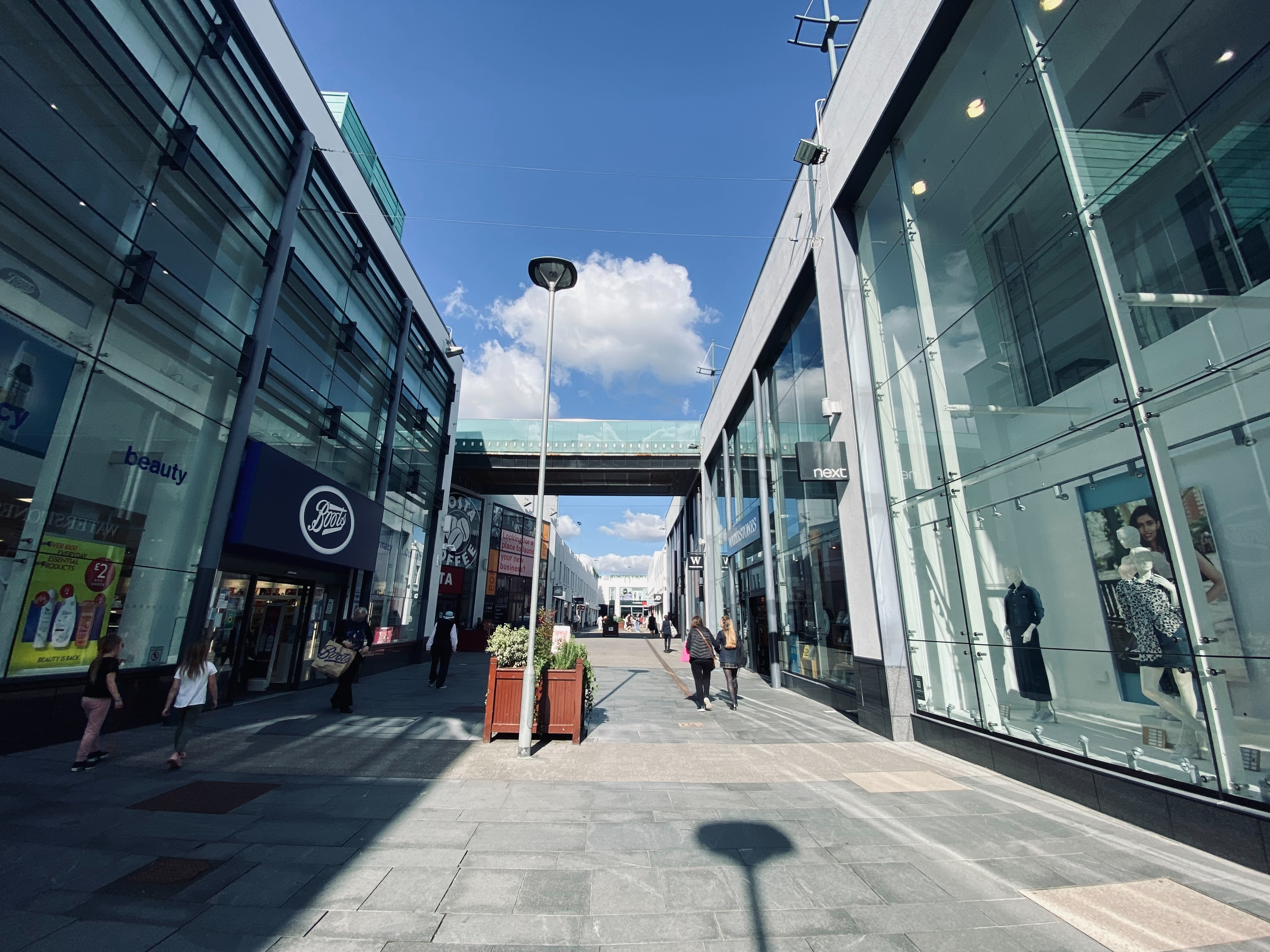
George Street

Historically, Altrincham was a market town and the two main areas of employment were agriculture and market trade. Although the town went into decline in the 15th century, it recovered and the annual fairs lasted until the mid-19th century and the market still continues. During the Industrial Revolution, Altrincham grew as an industrial town, particularly the Broadheath area, which was developed into an industrial estate. In 1801, there were four cotton mills in Altrincham, although they had closed by the 1851 census. The decline of the textile industry in Altrincham mirrored the decline of the industry in the Trafford area as a result of a lack of investment and the development of more established industrial areas such as Manchester, Ashton-under-Lyne and Oldham. During the late 19th and early 20th centuries, heavier industries moved into Broadheath, providing local employment. The area steadily declined during the second half of the 20th century, with employment at Broadheath falling from 8,000 to 5,000 between 1960 and 1970. Despite the presence of retailers such as Tesco, Sainsbury's and Marks & Spencer in the town, a new Asda superstore in Broadheath and redevelopment schemes costing over £100 million, The town's 15.5% level of employment in retail is below the national average of 16.9%. Altrincham, with its neighbours Bowdon and Hale, is said to constitute a "stockbroker belt", with well-appointed dwellings in an area of sylvan opulence.

The historic market town developed as a residential area in the 19th century, although it retains its retail heritage in the Old Market Place (a conservation area) and a new pedestrianised shopping centre. The retail districts of the town have more recently fallen victim to decline, due to competition from the nearby Trafford Centre and a regenerated Manchester city centre. In 2006, Trafford Metropolitan Borough Council unveiled plans for a £1.5 million redevelopment for the town centre. The renovation will create 146,000 square feet (13,600 m^{2}) of new retail space and 203,000 square feet (18,900 m^{2}) of refurbished space, providing 349,000 square feet (32,400 m^{2}) in total.

Construction on Altair, a £100 million development on Oakfield Road, began in September 2019 after many years of delay. The scheme includes apartments, shops and eating places and will create a new public square linking it to the nearby Altrincham Interchange, which underwent a £19 million refurbishment in 2015. A 2010 survey found that despite being in one of the country's most affluent areas, nearly a third of the shops in Altrincham were vacant; Trafford council attributed the high number (78) to the effects of the recession and plans to refurbish Stamford House, which left most of its shops unused.

According to the 2011 UK census, the main industries of employment of residents in Altrincham were wholesale and retail trade (14.8%), human health and social work activities (13.0%), and professional, scientific and technical activities (11.6%). The census recorded the economic inactivity of residents aged 16–74 as 3.5% looking after home or family, 2.8% long-term sick or disabled, 4.1% students and 1.5% economically inactive for other reasons. The 3.1% unemployment rate of Altrincham was low compared with the national rate of 4.4%.

== Transport ==
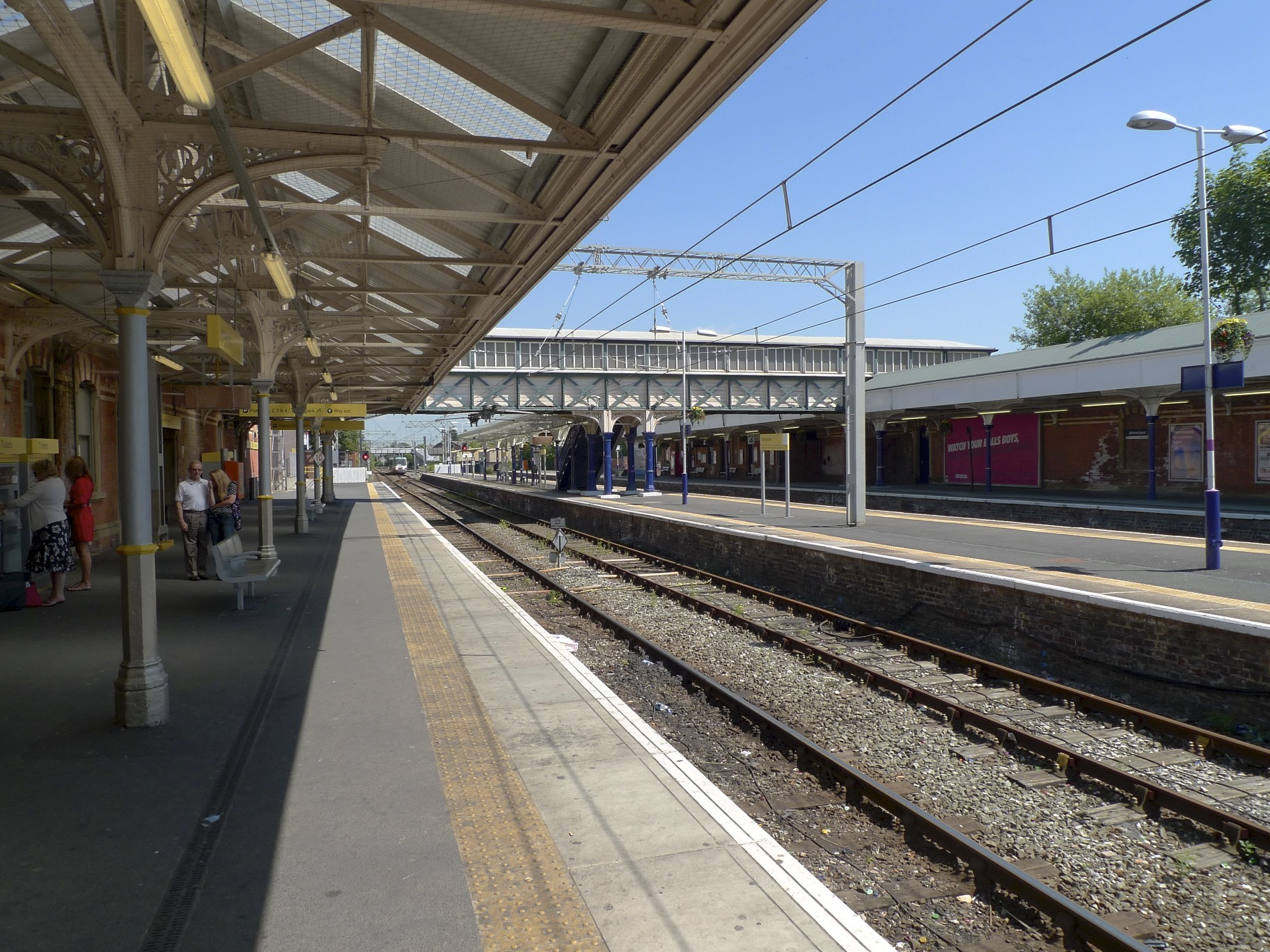
Altrincham station, 2010

Altrincham Interchange is the hub for railway, tram and bus services.

The town is the south-western terminus of the Manchester Metrolink's Altrincham Line. Regular services on two routes connect the town with Manchester Piccadilly, Manchester Victoria and Bury.

National Rail services on the Mid-Cheshire Line are operated by Northern Trains; the line links both Altrincham and Navigation Road stations with Chester, Northwich, Stockport and Manchester Piccadilly.

Local bus services are operated predominantly by Metroline Manchester, but also Stagecoach Manchester, D&G Bus and Warrington's Own Buses. These connect the town with Sale, Stockport, the Trafford Centre, Piccadilly Gardens and Warrington.

Manchester Airport, the largest in the UK outside the wider London area, lies 5 miles (8 km) to the south-east of the town.

== Education ==
As Altrincham was part of the Bowdon parish, children from the township may have gone to the 16th-century school established at Bowdon; before that point, the town had no formal education system. A salt merchant from Dunham Woodhouses founded a school at Oldfield House intended for 40 boys aged 8–11 from the surrounding area. Sunday schools were set up in the late 18th and early 19th centuries. Altrincham's increasing population prompted the founding of more schools during the early 19th century; by 1856 the town had nineschools, one college and 23 teachers. The introduction of compulsory education during the second half of the 19th century increased the demand for schools; by 1886, Altrincham had 12 church schools and eight private schools.

Responsibility for local education fell to Cheshire County Council in 1903. Loreto Convent, the County High School for Girls and Altrincham County High School for Boys, were founded in 1909, 1910 and 1912 respectively. Although still open, these schools have since changed their names to Altrincham Grammar School for Girls, Altrincham Grammar School for Boys and Loreto Grammar School. Altrincham received evacuees during the Second World War and it was in this period that St. Ambrose College was founded.

Altrincham now has eighteen primary schools, one special school and eight secondary schools, including five grammar schools; the Trafford district maintains a selective education system, assessed by entrance exams set by each school. Several of Altrincham's secondary schools have specialist status: Altrincham College (arts); Altrincham Grammar School for Boys (language); Altrincham Grammar School for Girls (language); Blessed Thomas Holford Catholic College (maths and computing); Loreto Grammar School (science and maths); and St. Ambrose College (maths and computing). Altrincham College of Arts, Altrincham Grammar School for Boys, Altrincham Grammar School for Girls, Blessed Thomas Holford Catholic College, Loreto Grammar School and St. Ambrose College were all rated as outstanding in 2011–12 Ofsted reports. Brentwood Special School is a mixed school for 11- to 19-year-olds who have special needs or learning difficulties.

Altrincham is home to Oakfield Nursery School, one of the longest established family-owned nurseries in the UK; it was voted UK Nursery of the Year in 2014 and Best Individual Nursery in 2008.

== Religion ==
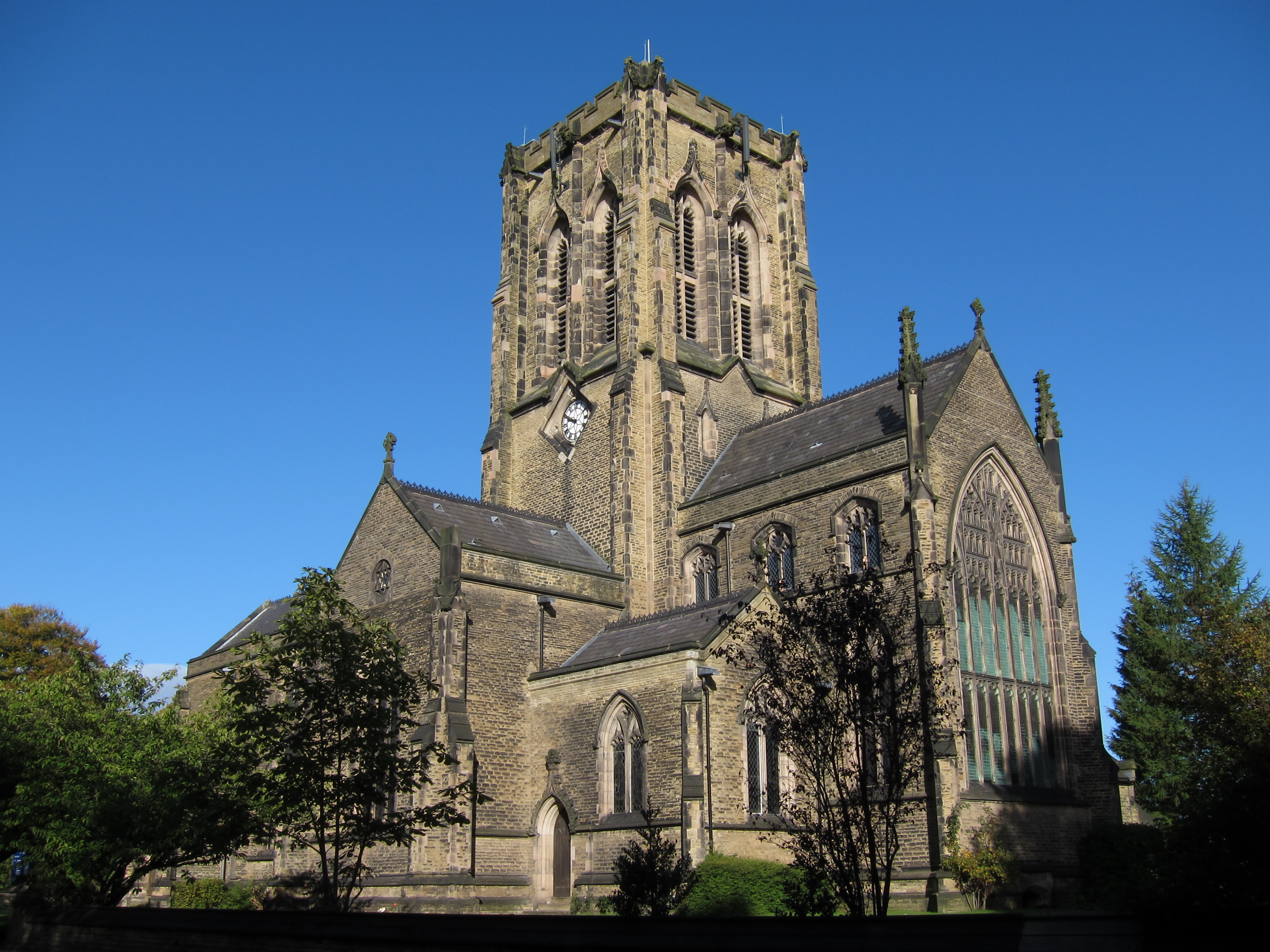
The Grade II* listed Church of St Margaret

During the medieval and post-medieval periods, the township of Altrincham was part of Bowdon parish. Low population density meant that the town did not have a church until the Anglican church established a chapel of ease in 1799. Nonconformists were also present in Altrincham; Methodists set up a chapel in 1790 and Baptists built one in the 1870s. Irish immigrants in the 1830s and 1840s also returned Roman Catholicism to the area, the first Roman Catholic church built in Altrincham being St Vincent's, in 1860.

Several churches in Altrincham are deemed architecturally important enough to be designated Grade II listed buildings. These are Christ Church, the Church of St Alban, the Church of St George, the Church of St John the Evangelist, and Trinity United Reformed Church. Of the 11 Grade II* listed buildings in Trafford, one is in Altrincham: the Church of St Margaret.

In the 2001 UK census, 78.8% of Altrincham's residents reported themselves as being Christian, 1.1% Jewish, 1.1% Muslim, 0.4% Hindu, 0.2% Buddhist and 0.1% Sikh. The census recorded 12.1% as having no religion, 0.2% with an alternative religion, while 6.1% did not state a religion.

Altrincham is in the Roman Catholic Diocese of Shrewsbury, and the Church of England Diocese of Chester. The nearest synagogue, belonging to Hale and District Hebrew Congregation, is on Shay Lane in Hale Barns.

== Culture ==
=== Landmarks and attractions ===
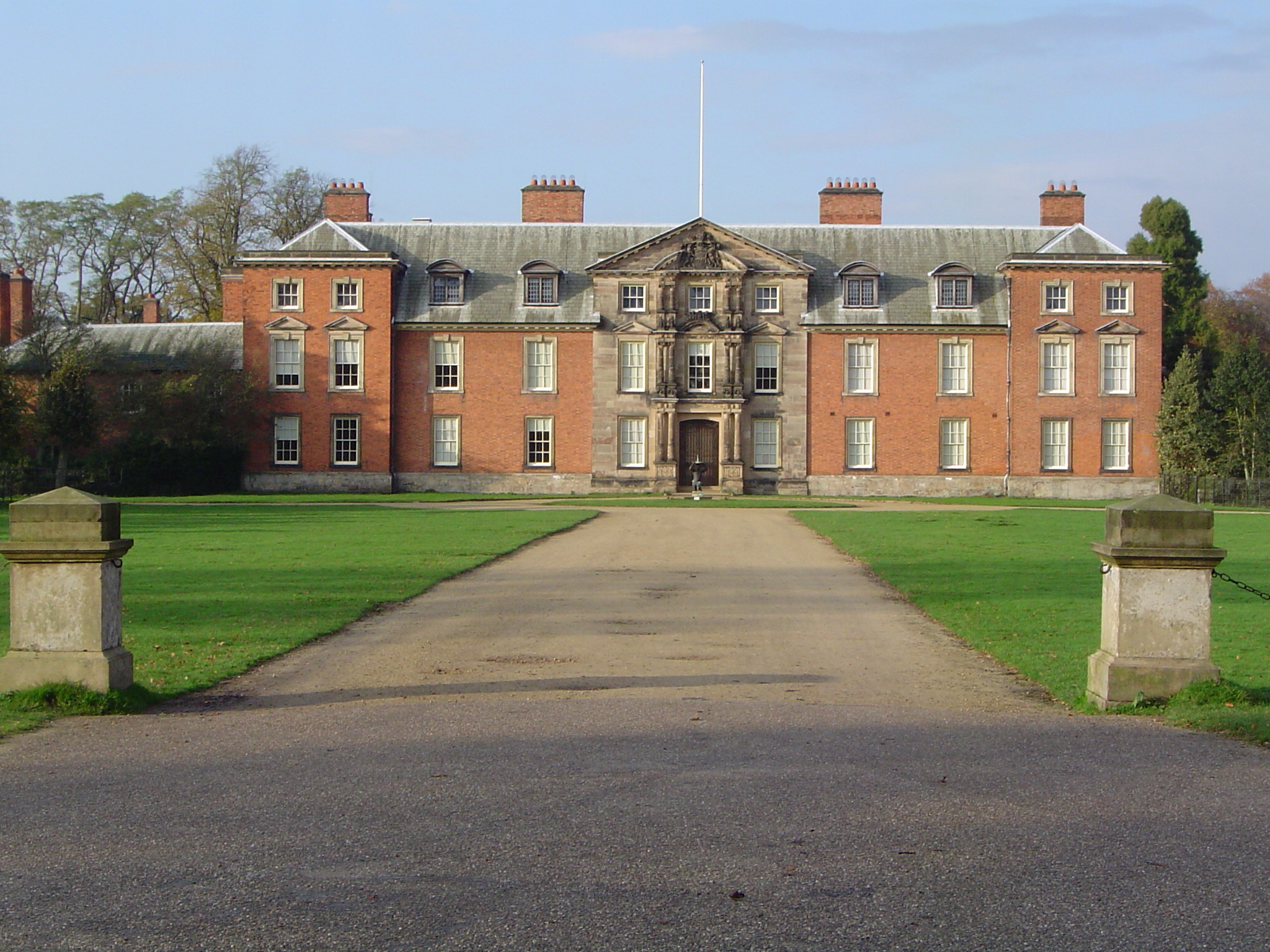
Dunham Massey Hall

The Old Market Place is thought to stand on the site of the original town settlement. Now a registered conservation area, it consists of a series of part timber-framed buildings echoing the wattle and daube constructions of the original houses and burgage plots; the cobblestone paving was replaced in 1896. The Buttermarket, which stood in the area near the Old Market Place from the 17th century until the late 19th century, was also the site for dispensing early local justice. A courtroom, stocks and whipping post saw public floggings take place there until the early 19th century. The whipping post and stocks were restored as a tourist attraction by local traders in the 1990s.

However, the Buttermarket area was also a site of religious importance, since prospective brides and grooms are thought to have declared their intentions here. In 1814, Thomas de Quincey described the Old Market Place in his Confessions of an English Opium Eater, while travelling from Manchester to Chester. He noted how little the place had changed since his visit 14 years earlier, at the age of three, and that "fruits, such as can be had in July and flowers were scattered about in profusion; even the stalls of the butchers, from their brilliant cleanliness, appeared attractive; and bonny young women of Altrincham were all tripping about in caps and aprons coquettishly disposed" Another of Altrincham's attractions is the historic market, set up over 700 years ago when the town was first established.

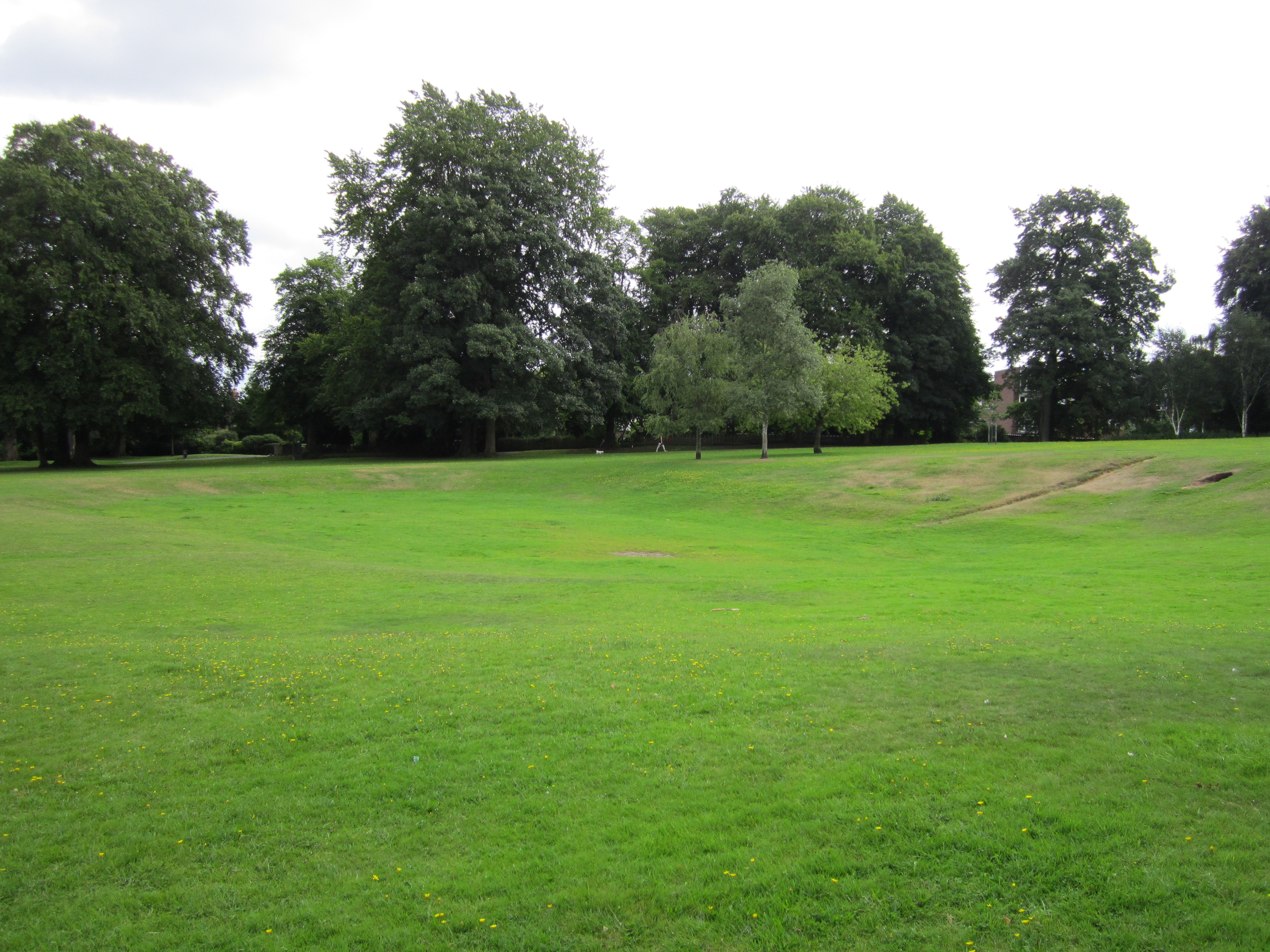
John Leigh Park

Of the 21 conservation areas in Trafford, ten are in Altrincham: The Downs, The Devisdale, Bowdon, Ashley Heath, Goose Green, Old Market Place, Sandiway, George Street, the Linotype Housing Estate and Stamford New Road. On the town's outskirts is the 18th-century Dunham Massey Hall, surrounded by its 250-acre (1 km^{2}) deer park, both now owned by the National Trust. The hall is early Georgian in style and, along with its stables and carriage house, is a Grade I listed building.

Royd House was built between 1914 and 1916, by local architect Edgar Wood, as his own residence. It has a flat concrete roof, a concave façade and is faced in Portland red stone and Lancashire brick. It is regarded as one of the most advanced examples of early 20th-century domestic architecture and is referenced in architectural digests. It has been a Grade I listed building since 1975, one of six such buildings in Trafford. The Grade II listed clock outside the main transport interchange was built in 1880.

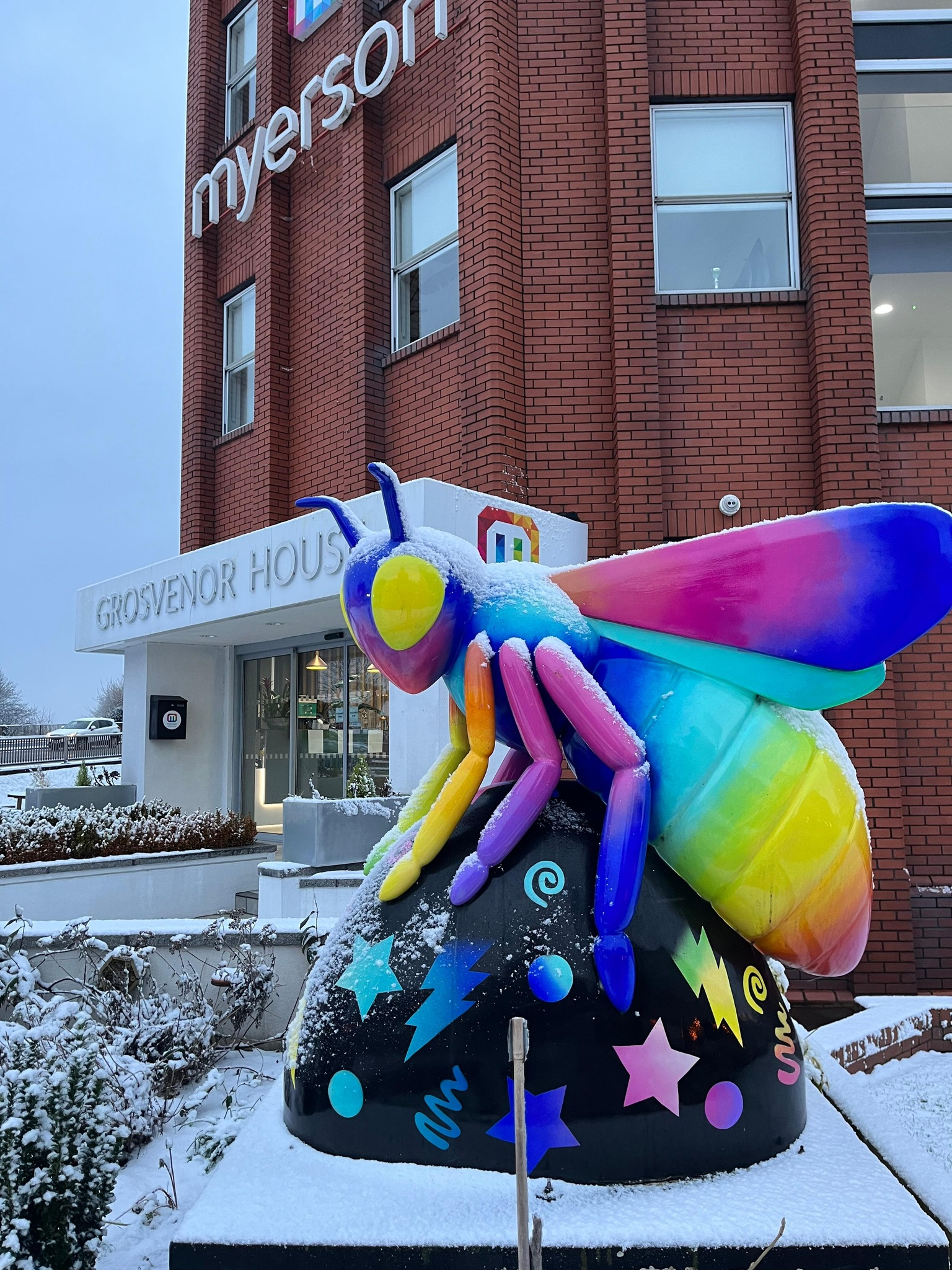
Bee-bop-a-raver, a five-foot sculpture inspired by Manchester's hive of musical activity in the 1980s and 1990s

The 16-acre (6.5 ha) Stamford Park was designed by landscape gardener John Shaw. It opened to the public in 1880, as a sports park with areas for cricket and football. The land was donated by George Grey, the 7th Earl of Stamford, and is now owned and run by Trafford Council. The park is listed as Grade II on the Register of Parks and Gardens of Special Historic Interest in England, and has won a bronze award from the Greenspace award scheme.

A more recent addition to Altrincham's public art is Bee-bop-a-raver, a five-foot bee sculpture created by Stretford-based artist Caroline Daly. Installed in December 2018, in front of the Myerson Solicitors office on Grosvenor Road, the sculpture draws inspiration from Manchester's vibrant music scene of the 1980s and 1990s. It formed part of the wider Bee in the City initiative that ran between July and September 2018, celebrating the city-region's cultural and industrial heritage through individually-designed bee sculptures.

=== Events and venues ===
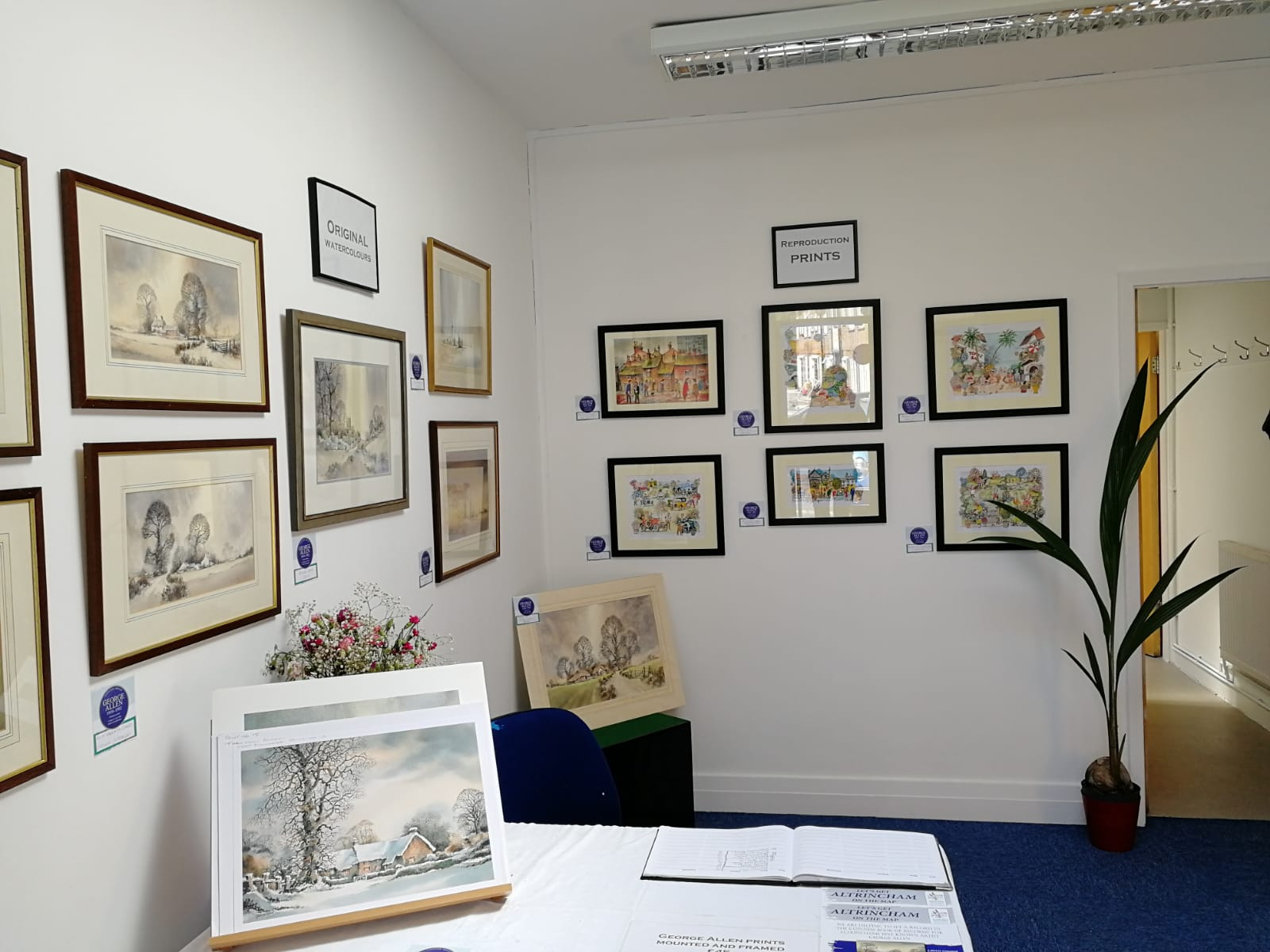
The George Allen Art Gallery

Altrincham has its own annual festival that has taken place for over 40 years (except in 2020, due to the COVID-19 pandemic); it takes place in late June/early July. The festival, which is entirely self funded and arranged by volunteers, consists of a parade through the town and culminates in a two-day music and family event at Beechfields. The latter consists of a stage showcasing local music and culture, together with a fun fair, food village and community stalls. The event is the largest free family event in the Borough of Trafford.

Altrincham has two theatres, the Altrincham Garrick Playhouse and the Club Theatre (latterly known as the Altrincham Little Theatre). The Altrincham Garrick group was formed in 1913. The Garrick held the world stage premiere of Psycho in 1982. In 1998, it received a grant of £675,000 from the National Lottery, as part of a £900,000 redevelopment of the theatre, which was completed in 1999. The Club Theatre group began in 1896, as the St Margaret's Church Institute Amateur Dramatics Society. It provides a venue for the Trafford Youth Theatre production each year and it runs the Hale One Act Festival, an annual week-long event started in 1972. The club has received awards from both the Greater Manchester Drama Federation and the Cheshire Theatre Guild.

Altrincham also had Greater Manchester's only Michelin-starred restaurant, the Juniper.

== Media ==
Local news and television programmes are provided by BBC North West and ITV Granada. Television signals are received from the Winter Hill TV transmitter.

Local radio stations are BBC Radio Manchester, Heart North West, Smooth North West, Greatest Hits Radio Manchester & The North West, Capital Manchester and Lancashire and RadioAlty, a community based station.

The town's local newspapers are Sale & Altrincham Messenger and Altrincham Today.

== Sport ==
Altrincham F.C., nicknamed The Robins, was founded in 1903 and play home matches at Moss Lane. The club plays in the National League. In the 1970s and 1980s, Altrincham F.C. built a reputation for giant-killing acts against Football League teams in FA Cup matches. The club has knocked out Football League opposition on a record 16 occasions, including a 1986 victory against top-flight Birmingham City. Altrincham won the forerunner of the Football Conference in its first two seasons, but was denied election to the Football League on both occasions, falling a single vote short in 1980. Altrincham have since had mixed fortunes; it was relegated to the Northern Premier League in 1997, but has since earned five promotions and suffered five relegations. Most recently, it has gained promotion to the National League in the 2019-20 season.

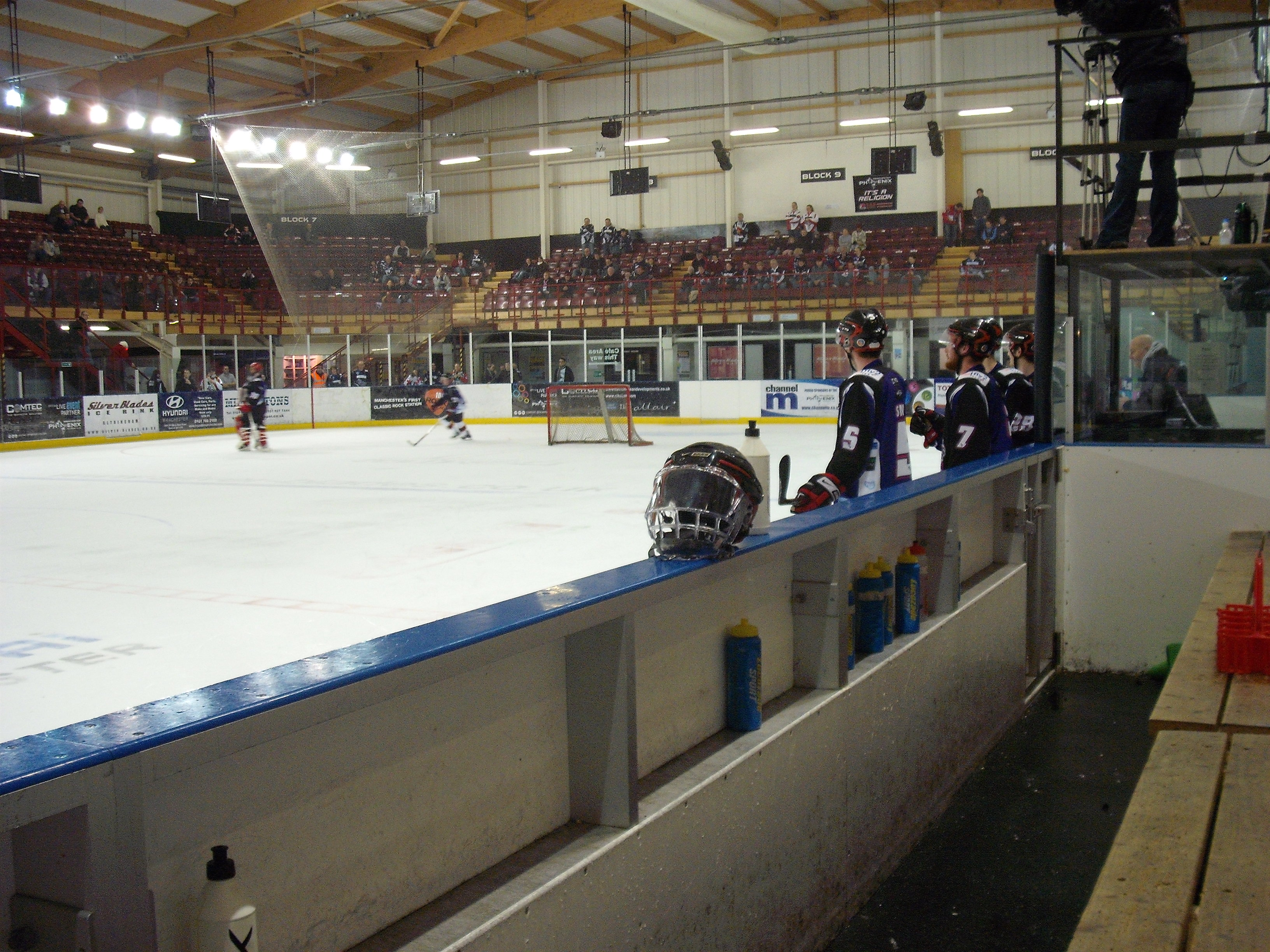
Altrincham Ice Dome is the home of Manchester Storm and Altrincham Aces

Altrincham is one of the few towns in north-west England with an ice rink; it has had an ice hockey team since 1961, when Altrincham Ice Rink was built in Broadheath. The Altrincham Aces (later renamed the Trafford Metros) played from 1961 until 2003, when the ice rink closed. The town then had a three-year period without a rink or ice hockey team, until construction of the 2,500 capacity Altrincham Ice Dome was completed.

Manchester Phoenix, a club having a professional presence in the English Premier Ice Hockey League and an extensive junior development aspect, relocated to the Ice Dome during the 2006–07 season, having withdrawn from competition two years earlier due to the high cost of playing matches at Manchester's MEN Arena. In 2009, the Manchester Phoenix English National Ice Hockey League team was renamed Trafford Metros, bringing the old Altrincham team's name back into use. When not being used by Phoenix, the Altrincham Ice Dome is open to the public for ice skating.

Founded in 1897, Altrincham Kersal plays rugby union; it has played at level six since being relegated from North One in 2012. Following the withdrawal of a number of Lancashire clubs from the county's union, it has been level transferred to play in the North Lancashire and Cumbria League for 2018–19. The club has produced two England and Sale Sharks players, Mark Cueto and Chris Jones, and continues to produce players for the Sale Jets.

Altrincham and District Athletics Club was founded in 1961 and provides training facilities for track and field, road running, cross-country running and fell running.

Seamons Cycling Club was formed in 1948 and is known locally as Seamons Moss.

== Notable people ==
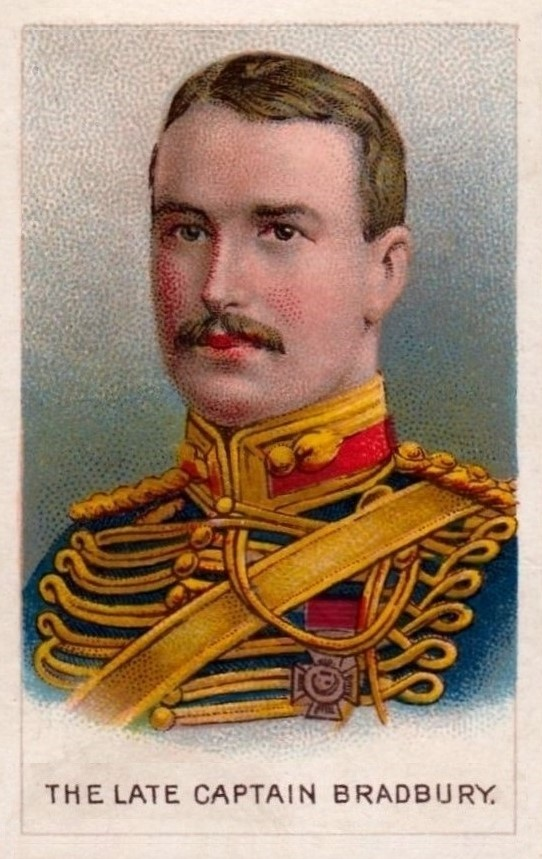
Edward Kinder Bradbury, VC 1914

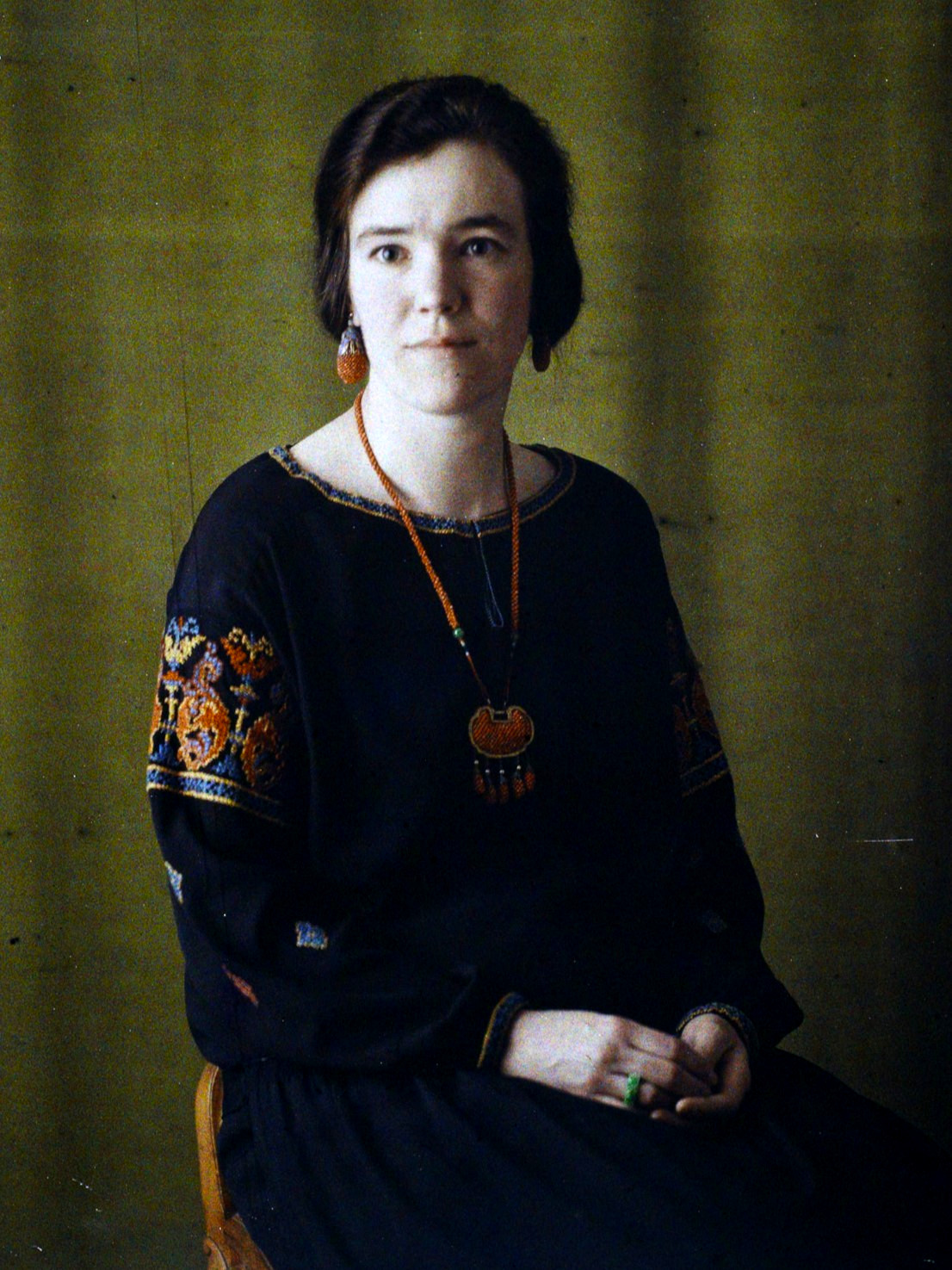
Eileen Power, 1926

- Helen Allingham (1848–1926), watercolourist and illustrator, lived in Altrincham and then Bowdon as a child
- Sir John Marriott (1859–1945), educationist, historian, politician and MP for Oxford, 1917 to 1922 and for York, 1923 to 1929
- Hewlett Johnson (1874–1966), curate and later vicar of St Margaret's from 1904 to 1924, later known as the "Red Dean" of Canterbury
- John Ireland (1879–1962), composer and music teacher was born in Bowdon
- Edward Kinder Bradbury (1881–1914), was born locally. He was awarded the Victoria Cross for gallantry and organising the defence of 'L' Battery at Nery against heavy odds in World War I
- Alison Uttley (1884–1976), wrote the Little Grey Rabbit books while living in Bowdon
- Sir John Leigh, 1st Baronet (1884–1959), mill-owner, politician and MP for Clapham, from 1922 to 1945
- Sir Alexander Paterson (1884–1947), penologist and prison commissioner; he developed Borstals
- Alice Behrens (1885–1952), Girl Guiding pioneer, born in Dunham Massey
- Eileen Power (1889–1940), economic historian and medievalist
- Ronald Gow (1897–1993), dramatist, wrote Love on the Dole, taught at Altrincham Grammar School for Boys
- Sir Michael Pollock (1916–2006), officer in the Royal Navy who became First Sea Lord, was born in Altrincham

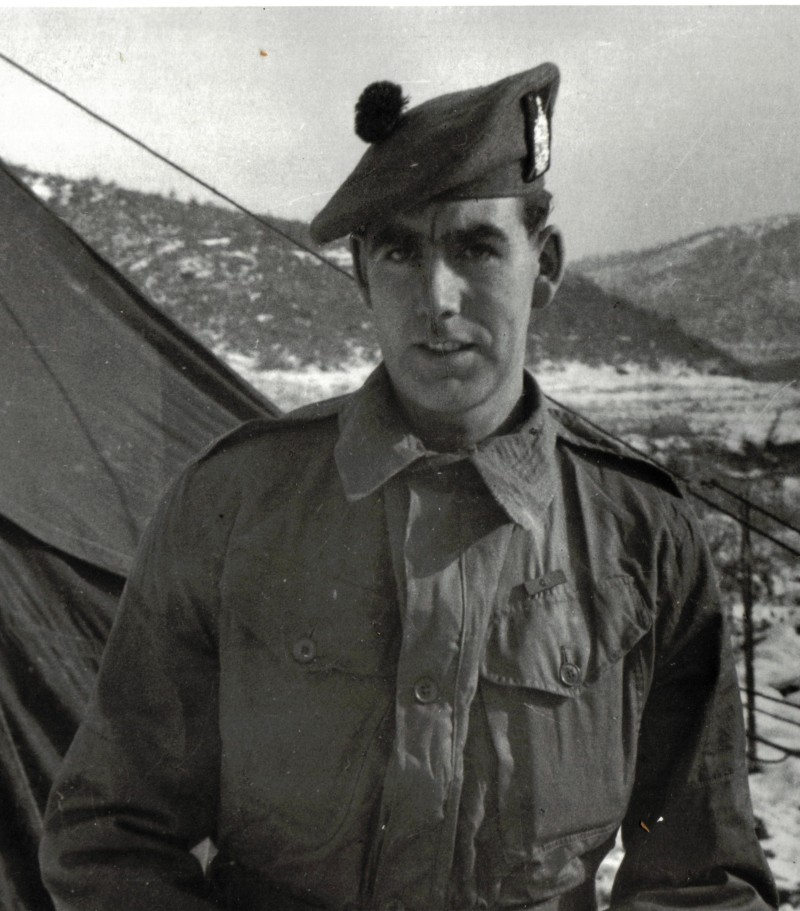
Bill Speakman VC, 2012

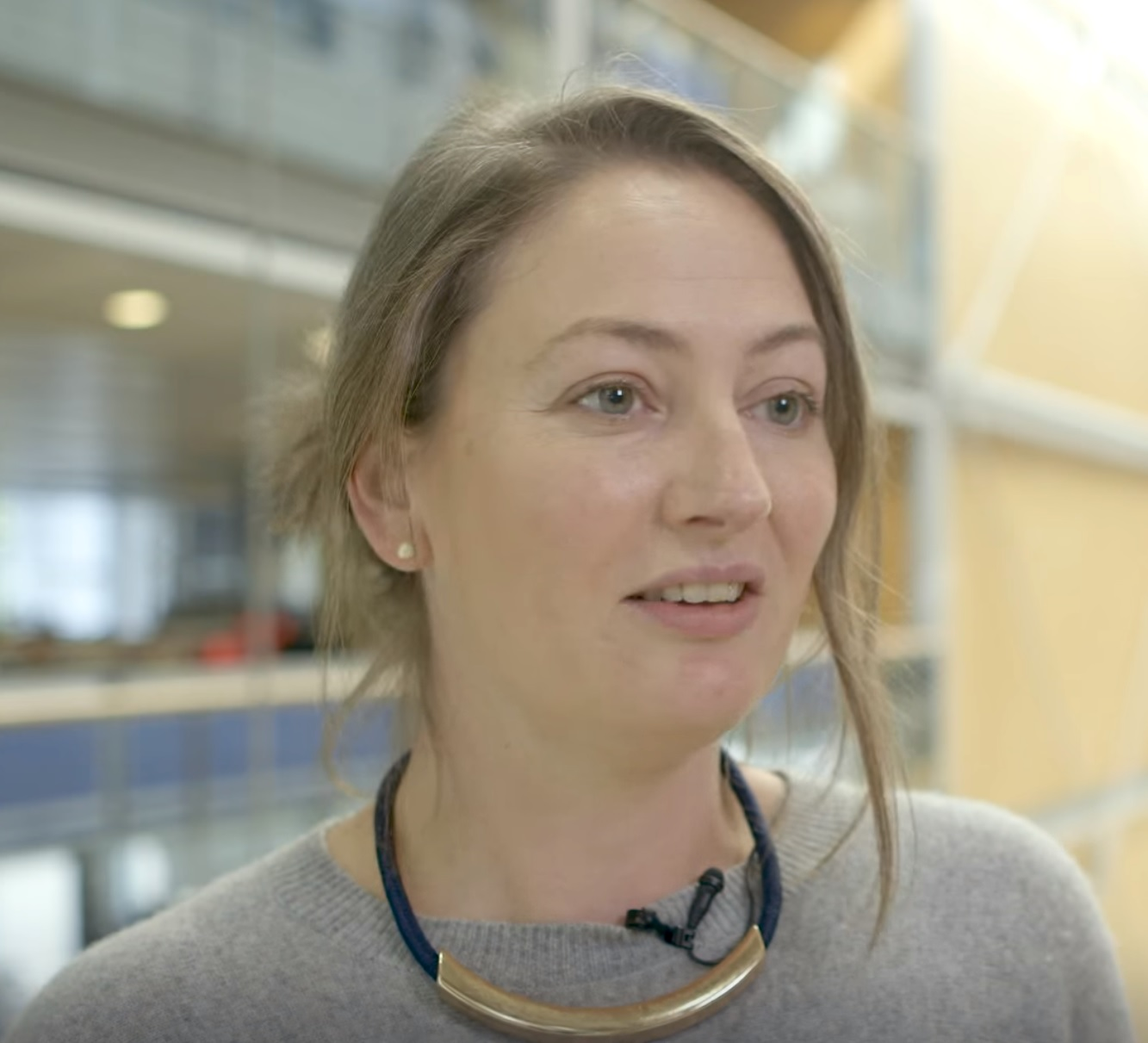
Anna Scaife, 2017

- Bill Speakman (1927–2018), born locally, received the Victoria Cross in 1951 for valour in the Korean War
- Jeremy Moon (1934–1973), abstract artist, was born in Altrincham
- Paula Tilbrook (1930–2019), actress who played Betty Eagleton in the ITV soap opera Emmerdale
- Sir Chris Bonington (born 1934), mountaineer, lived for a time in Bowdon
- Sir Edward Jones (1936–2007), British Army Quartermaster-General and Parliament's Black Rod
- Nick Estcourt (1942–1978), mountaineer and alpinist, killed in an avalanche on the West Ridge of K2
- Paul Young (1947–2000), of Sad Café and Mike and the Mechanics, died at his home in Hale
- Angela Cartwright (born 1952), film and TV actress was born in the town
- Christopher Webber (born 1953), musicologist, dramatist, actor, theatre director and writer
- Alan Barnes (born 1959), award-winning jazz saxophone and clarinet player
- Ian Brown (born 1963) and John Squire (born 1962) of The Stone Roses both attended Altrincham Grammar School for Boys
- Simon Wolstencroft (born 1963), rock drummer, played with the Fall, the Smiths and The Stone Roses
- Helena Morrissey, Baroness Morrissey (born 1966), financier, campaigner and Conservative peer
- Gavin Patterson (born 1967), businessman, President and Chief Revenue Officer of Salesforce
- David Gray (born 1968), singer-songwriter on White Ladder
- Stirling Gallacher (born 1970), actress. played George Woodson in the BBC soap opera Doctors
- Anna Scaife (born 1981), Professor of Radio Astronomy at the University of Manchester and Head of the Jodrell Bank Centre for Astrophysics
- Alex Norris (born 1984), Labour MP for Nottingham North and Kimberley was born in Altrincham.

=== Sport ===
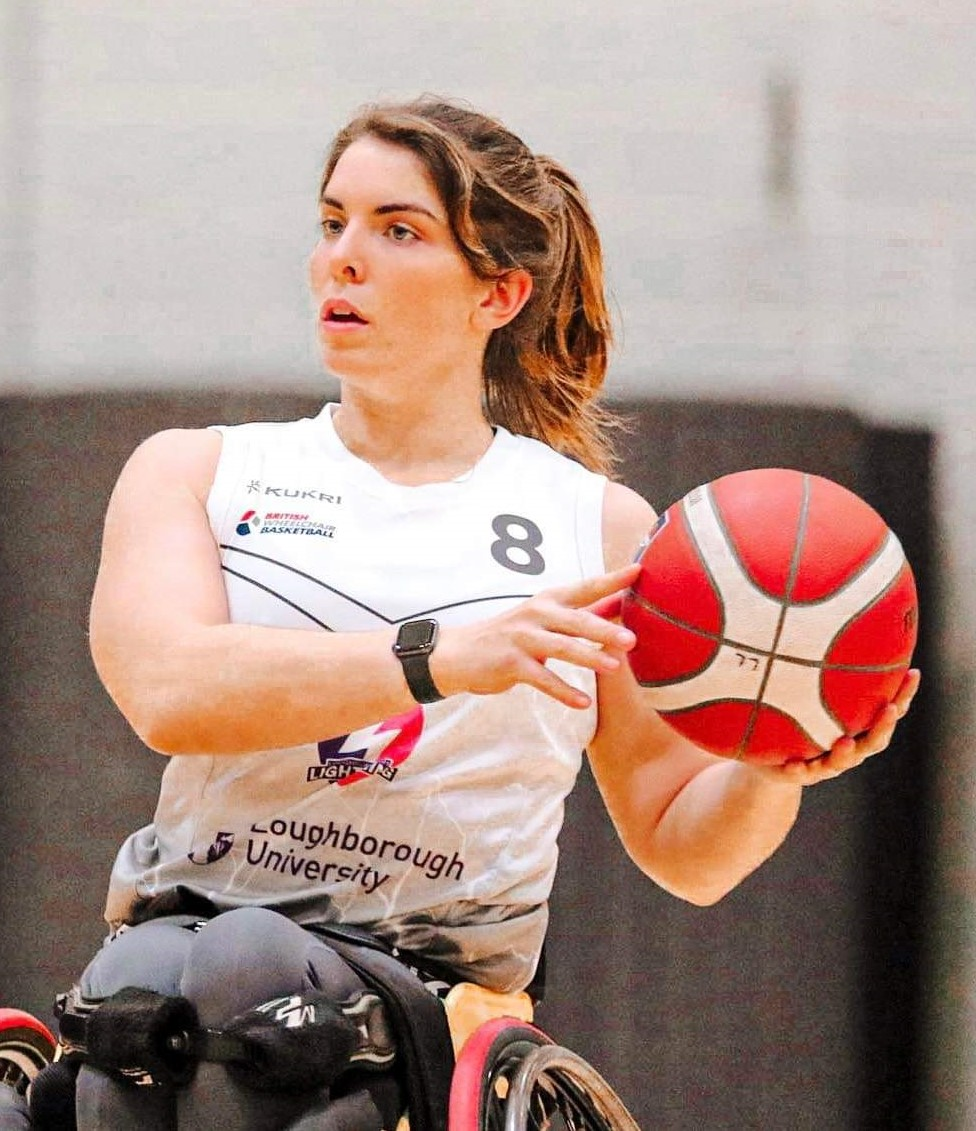
Laurie Williams, 2022

- Francis Brooke (1884–1960), cricketer, played in 62 first-class matches
- Chris Jones (born 1945), footballer who played over 320 games
- Frank Carrodus (born 1949), footballer who played 375 games including 150 for Aston Villa
- Paul Bradshaw (1956–2024), footballer who played over 370 games, including 200 for Wolves
- Paul Allott (born 1956), Lancashire and England Test cricketer, played 245 First-class games and 13 Test matches.
- Dave Esser (born 1957), footballer who played over 260 games including 180 for Rochdale
- Martin Lane (born 1961), footballer who played 274 games in two sessions with Chester City
- Nicky Summerbee (born 1971), footballer, sports TV pundit and commentator; he played 471 games
- Laurie Williams (born 1992), wheelchair basketball player, participated at the 2012, the 2016, the 2020 and the 2024 Summer Paralympics
- Chris Ingram (born 1994), rally driver, won the FIA European Rally Championship in 2019.

== See also ==
- Listed buildings in Altrincham
