= Goose Pond =

Goose Pond may refer to a water body or surrounding land in the United States:

== Water bodies ==
- Goose Pond (New Hampshire)
- Goose Pond (New York), Herkimer County, New York
- Goose Pond (Queens), Queens County, New York
- Goose Pond (Washington)

== Lands ==
- Goose Pond Fish and Wildlife Area in Indiana
- Goose Pond Reservation in Massachusetts
- Goose Pond Scout Reservation in Pennsylvania

== See also ==
- Goose Lake (disambiguation)
- Goosepond Mountain State Park in Orange County, New York
