= Goose Lake =

Goose Lake may refer to:

== Canada ==
=== Lakes ===
- Goose Lake (Cape Breton), Nova Scotia
- Goose Lakes, Halifax, Nova Scotia
- Goose Lake (Argyle), Nova Scotia
- Goose Lake (Barrington), Nova Scotia
- Goose Lake (District of Chester), Nova Scotia
- Goose Lake (Cumberland), Nova Scotia
- Goose Lake (Guysborough), Nova Scotia
- East Goose Lake, Nova Scotia

=== Other places ===
- Goose Lake, Alberta, aka Lone Pine, a hamlet

== Russia ==
- Lake Gusinoye (Goose Lake), Buryatia, Russia

== United States ==
=== Lakes ===
- Goose Lake (Anchorage), Alaska
- Goose Lake (Oregon–California)
- Goose Lake (Clinton County, Iowa)
- Goose Lake (Marquette County, Michigan)
- Goose Lake (South Dakota)
- Goose Lake (Washington)

=== Other places ===
- Goose Lake, Iowa, a town
- Goose Lake Township, Grundy County, Illinois
- Goose Lake Valley, a valley in Oregon
- Goose Lake National Forest, Oregon
- Goose Lake State Recreation Area, Oregon
- Goose Lake Prairie State Natural Area, Illinois

== See also ==
- Anderson Goose Lake, Iowa
- Goose Harbour Lake, Nova Scotia
- Goose Lake meteorite
- Goose Pond (disambiguation)
- Mother Goose Lake, Alaska
