= Goose Lake, Iowa =

- City
- Location of Goose Lake, Iowa
- Coordinates: 41°58′02″N 90°22′41″W
- Country: United States
- State: Iowa
- County: Clinton

Area
  - Total: 0.33 sq mi (0.86 km^{2})
  - Land: 0.33 sq mi (0.86 km^{2})
  - Water: 0 sq mi (0.00 km^{2})
- Elevation: 699 ft (213 m)

Population (2020)
  - Total: 239
  - Density: 722.4/sq mi (278.92/km^{2})
- Time zone: UTC-6 (Central (CST))
  - Summer (DST): UTC-5 (CDT)
- ZIP code: 52750
- Area code: 563
- FIPS code: 19-31665
- GNIS feature ID: 2394932
- Website: www.gooselakeiowa.org

Goose Lake is a city in Clinton County, Iowa, United States. The population was 239 at the time of the 2020 census.

== History ==
Goose Lake was platted in 1889, and it was incorporated in 1908. It took its name from nearby Goose Lake.

== Geography ==
According to the United States Census Bureau, the city has a total area of 0.32 square miles (0.83 km^{2}), all land.

== Demographics ==
Historical populations
Year	Pop.	±%
1880	61	—
1910	110	+80.3%
1920	97	−11.8%
1930	128	+32.0%
1940	145	+13.3%
1950	148	+2.1%
1960	191	+29.1%
1970	218	+14.1%
1980	274	+25.7%
1990	221	−19.3%
2000	232	+5.0%
2010	240	+3.4%
2020	239	−0.4%
Source:"U.S. Census website". United States Census Bureau. and Iowa Data Center; Source: U.S. Decennial Census

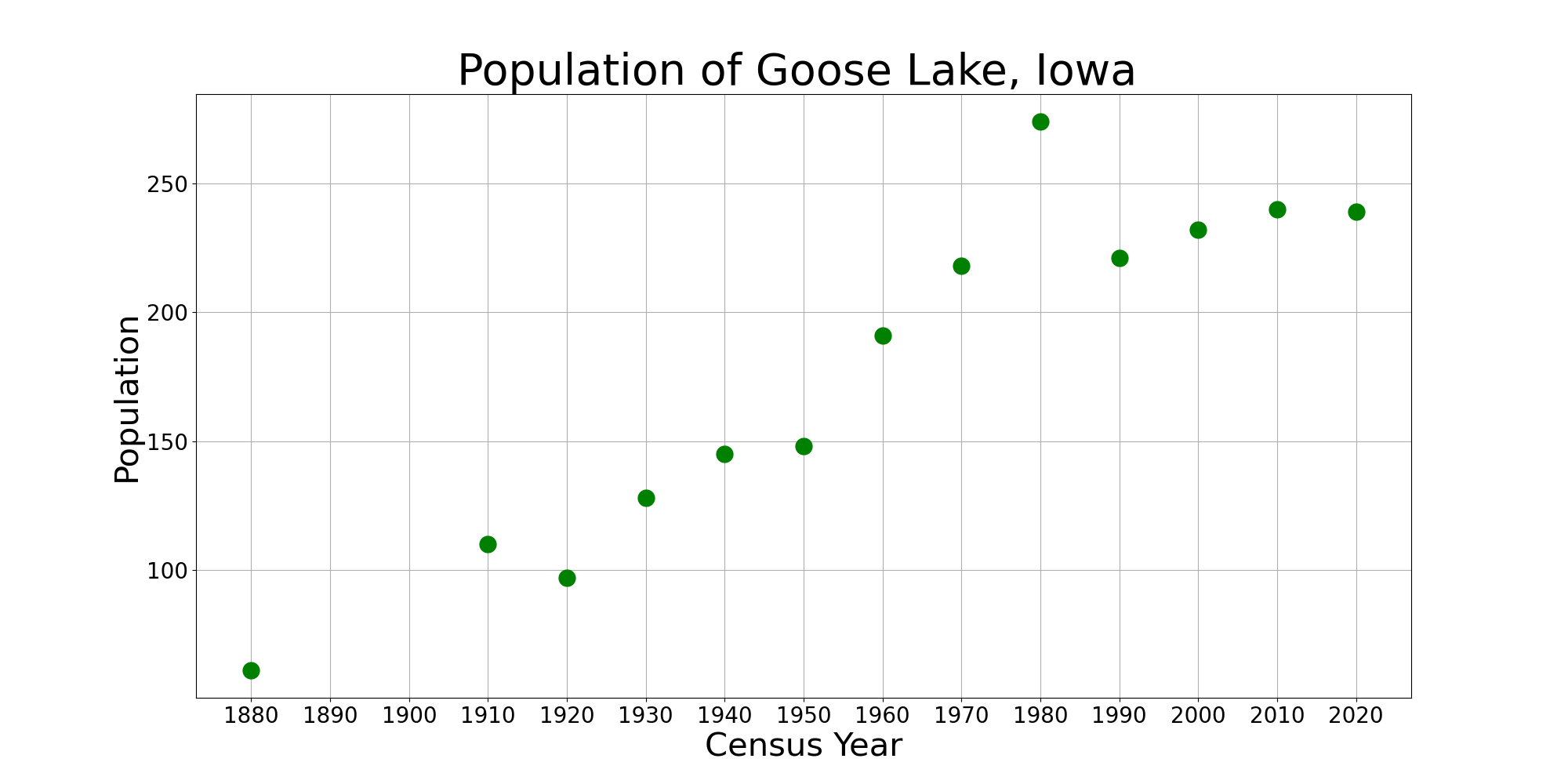
The population of Goose Lake, Iowa from US census data

=== 2020 census ===
As of the census of 2020, there were 239 people, 89 households, and 64 families residing in the city. The population density was 722.4 inhabitants per square mile (278.9/km^{2}). There were 93 housing units at an average density of 281.1 per square mile (108.5/km^{2}). The racial makeup of the city was 97.9% White, 0.8% Black or African American, 0.0% Native American, 0.0% Asian, 0.0% Pacific Islander, 0.4% from other races and 0.8% from two or more races. Hispanic or Latino persons of any race comprised 0.8% of the population.

Of the 89 households, 41.6% of which had children under the age of 18 living with them, 52.8% were married couples living together, 12.4% were cohabitating couples, 20.2% had a female householder with no spouse or partner present and 14.6% had a male householder with no spouse or partner present. 28.1% of all households were non-families. 18.0% of all households were made up of individuals, 7.9% had someone living alone who was 65 years old or older.

The median age in the city was 36.3 years. 30.1% of the residents were under the age of 20; 8.8% were between the ages of 20 and 24; 20.9% were from 25 and 44; 26.8% were from 45 and 64; and 13.4% were 65 years of age or older. The gender makeup of the city was 47.7% male and 52.3% female.

=== 2010 census ===
As of the census of 2010, there were 240 people, 89 households, and 61 families living in the city. The population density was 750.0 inhabitants per square mile (289.6/km^{2}). There were 90 housing units at an average density of 281.3 per square mile (108.6/km^{2}). The racial makeup of the city was 99.2% White and 0.8% from two or more races.

There were 89 households, of which 40.4% had children under the age of 18 living with them, 56.2% were married couples living together, 10.1% had a female householder with no husband present, 2.2% had a male householder with no wife present, and 31.5% were non-families. 28.1% of all households were made up of individuals, and 11.3% had someone living alone who was 65 years of age or older. The average household size was 2.70 and the average family size was 3.39.

The median age in the city was 35.8 years. 32.5% of residents were under the age of 18; 8% were between the ages of 18 and 24; 28.3% were from 25 to 44; 18.3% were from 45 to 64; and 12.9% were 65 years of age or older. The gender makeup of the city was 48.8% male and 51.3% female.

=== 2000 census ===
As of the census of 2000, there were 232 people, 84 households, and 61 families living in the city. The population density was 710.9 inhabitants per square mile (274.5/km^{2}). There were 86 housing units at an average density of 263.5 per square mile (101.7/km^{2}). The racial makeup of the city was 97.84% White, and 2.16% from two or more races. Hispanic or Latino of any race were 0.43% of the population.

There were 84 households, out of which 40.5% had children under the age of 18 living with them, 63.1% were married couples living together, 6.0% had a female householder with no husband present, and 26.2% were non-families. 23.8% of all households were made up of individuals, and 11.9% had someone living alone who was 65 years of age or older. The average household size was 2.76 and the average family size was 3.21.

In the city, the population was spread out, with 31.5% under the age of 18, 6.9% from 18 to 24, 30.6% from 25 to 44, 20.3% from 45 to 64, and 10.8% who were 65 years of age or older. The median age was 33 years. For every 100 females, there were 121.0 males. For every 100 females age 18 and over, there were 103.8 males.

The median income for a household in the city was $43,125, and the median income for a family was $48,523. Males had a median income of $31,875 versus $22,679 for females. The per capita income for the city was $15,453. None of the families and 2.6% of the population were living below the poverty line.

== Education ==
The Northeast Community School District operates public schools serving the community.
