= Altrincham Town Hall =

Municipal building in Altrincham, Greater Manchester, England

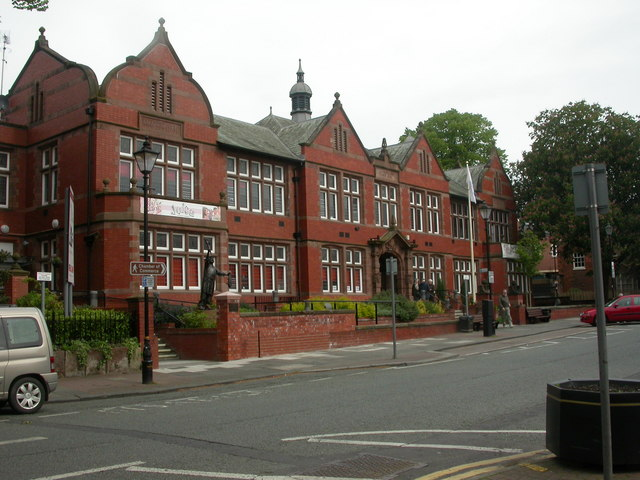
- Altrincham Town Hall

- Shown in Greater Manchester
- 53.3878°N 2.3522°W
- Location: Market Street, Altrincham

History
- Built: 1901

Site notes
- Architect: Charles Albert Hindle
- Architectural style: Jacobean style

Altrincham Town Hall is a municipal building in Market Street, Altrincham, Greater Manchester, England. The town hall was the headquarters of Altrincham Borough Council.

== History ==
Following significant industrial growth, particularly in the Broadheath area after the businessman, Benjamin Tilghman, established the town as the British hub of the sandblasting industry, Altrincham became an urban district in 1895. In this context, rather than use the old town hall, the new council decided to procure a new town hall: the site selected on the corner of Market Street and Dunham Road was occupied by a private property equipped with coach house and stables.

A design competition for the new building was assessed by John Ely, President of the Manchester Association of British Architects, and won by Charles Albert Hindle. Construction started in 1899 although it was delayed while the builder removed an uncharted water cistern. The new building was designed in the Jacobean style, built in red brick with stone dressings at a cost of £7,500 and officially opened in November 1901.

The original design (the central and right hand sections of the current building) involved an asymmetrical main frontage with five bays facing onto Market Street with the right hand bay featuring a Jacobean style gable containing a date stone; the central section of three bays, which slightly projected forward, featured a porch flanked by pilasters supporting an open pediment; there were mullioned windows on the first floor and an entablature carved with the name "Altrincham Town Hall" above. The building was extended to the south west by two extra bays in 1930 with the left hand end bay also featuring a Jacobean style gable containing a date stone so giving the building its current symmetry.

Further population growth, in part driven by the construction and expansion of the facilities operated the Linotype and Machinery Company, led to the area becoming a municipal borough with the town hall as its headquarters in 1937. The town hall ceased to be the local seat of government when the enlarged Trafford Council was formed in 1974. An extensive programme of restoration works was completed in 2006, so enabling the building to serve as a venue for marriages and civil partnership ceremonies. A statue depicting a market trader which had been sculpted by Colin Spofforth was unveiled outside the town hall by the Mayor of Trafford, Councillor Bernard Sharp, on 9 May 2008; a commemorative stone celebrating the Diamond Jubilee of Elizabeth II was erected there in spring 2012 and, following a crowdfunding campaign, a six-foot aluminium silhouette of a First World War soldier was installed outside the town hall in November 2018.

Works of art in the town hall include a painting by Tom Colley depicting troops loyal to the pretender to the throne, Charles Edward Stuart, seeking accommodation at The Red Lion Inn at Altrincham on 1 December 1745 during the Jacobite rising.
