= Mother Goose (disambiguation) =

Mother Goose is a figure in the literature of fairy-tales and nursery rhymes.

Mother Goose may also refer to:

== Arts, entertainment, and media ==
=== Literature ===
- Mother Goose (book), a book by Tasha Tudor
- Mother Goose and Grimm, an American comic strip
- Mother Goose in Prose, a children's stories collection by L. Frank Baum
- Mother Goose, pen name of Jeannette Walworth (1835-1918)

=== Music ===
- Mother Goose (band), a 1970s New Zealand band
- Mother Goose (ballet), ballet premiered in 1975
- Mother Goose (musical), 1903 Broadway musical
- "Mother Goose" (song), song on the album Aqualung by the progressive rock band Jethro Tull
- "Mother Goose", a 1998 song by horror rock band Rosemary's Billygoat
- "Ma mère l'Oye", a piece of music composed by Maurice Ravel
- "Unknown Mother Goose" (アンノウン・マザーグース), a song by late Vocaloid musician Wowaka

=== Other uses in arts, entertainment, and media ===
- "Mother Goose", the nickname of Jim Goose, a character in the movie Mad Max (1979)
- "Mother Goose", a nickname of Nick "Goose" Bradshaw, a character in the movie Top Gun (1986)
- Mixed-Up Mother Goose, a series of edutainment computer games
- Mother Goose Award, an annual award presented to "the most exciting newcomer to British children's book illustration"
- Mother Goose Club, an educational nursery school program and Youtube channel

== Other uses ==
- Mother Goose (horse), a racehorse
- Chris Pitman (born 1961), American rock keyboardist, nicknamed "Mother Goose"
- Mother Goose Lake, in Alaska, United States

== See also ==
- Goose (disambiguation)
- Father Goose (disambiguation)
