= Goose Green (disambiguation) =

Goose Green is a settlement in the Falkland Islands

Goose Green could also refer to the following places in England:

- Goose Green, Altrincham
- Goose Green, Cumbria
- Goose Green, Essex
- Goose Green, Gloucestershire
- Goose Green, Greater Manchester, a suburb of Wigan
- Goose Green, Hampshire
- Goose Green, Kent
- Goose Green, Lancashire
- Goose Green, London, a park in the London Borough of Southwark
  - Goose Green (ward)
- Goose Green, Norfolk
- Goose Green, West Sussex
- Goose Green, West Yorkshire
