= Seigneurial borough =

A seigneurial borough was an administrative division of urban government within a manor of medieval England, that granted a town's citizens or burgesses rights of burgage tenure and a degree of self-government under a charter or prescription granted by the Lord of the manor. Unlike fully incorporated boroughs, which received their privileges directly from The Crown through a Royal Charter and thus had "no lord but the King", seigneurial boroughs remained dependent on local manorial authority.
