= Goose Lakes =

Goose Lake refers to several lakes in close vicinity in Halifax County, Nova Scotia, Canada.

The lakes are located at:

- 44°42′0″N 63°1′55″W
- 44°42′0″N 63°19′55″W
- 44°43′0″N 63°11′55″W
- 44°50′0″N 63°4′58″W
