= Father Goose =

Father Goose may refer to:

== Arts and entertainment ==
- Father Goose (film), a 1964 World War II movie starring Cary Grant and Leslie Caron
- Father Goose, an alternate title of Fly Away Home, a 1996 film
- Father Goose, a character in some of L. Frank Baum's books
- Father Goose: His Book, a collection of nonsense poetry for children by L. Frank Baum
- Father Goose, a book by Chapman Mortimer that won the 1951 James Tait Black Memorial Prize for fiction
- Father Goose, a fictional character on the TV series On My Block

== People ==
- "Father Goose", pen name and registered trademark of poet and children's author Charles Ghigna
- "Father Goose", professional name of children's music artist Wayne Rhoden

== See also ==
- Gireogi appa, a Korean term literally translated as "goose dad"
- Mother Goose (disambiguation)
