= Goose Green, Altrincham =

Area of Altrincham, England

Coordinates: 53.3854°N 2.3501°W

Goose Green is a small pedestrianised town square in Altrincham, Trafford, Greater Manchester, England containing shops and restaurants.

One of the 21 conservation areas in Trafford, Goose Green, which started its existence as an area with residential cottages for local workers in the late 1700s, hosts an annual summer festival taking place always over the August bank holiday weekend.
