= Northeastern Pennsylvania Council =

Council of the Boy Scouts of America

Northeastern Pennsylvania Council #501
- Owner: Boy Scouts of America
- Headquarters: Moosic, Pennsylvania
- Country: United States
- Founded: 1990
- President: Andrew Kudasik
- Commissioner: Rick Stritzinger
- Scout Executive: Clark Garthwait
- Website nepabsa.org

Northeastern Pennsylvania Council, with headquarters in Moosic, Pennsylvania, formed in 1990 from the merger of Forest Lakes Council and Penn Mountains Council of the Boy Scouts of America. It covers the metropolitan area of Scranton and Wilkes-Barre, Pennsylvania. The council serves Lackawanna, Luzerne, Pike, Wayne, Wyoming counties, and portions of Susquehanna county.

== Organization ==
The council is geographically divided into two districts to serve scout units:

- Dan Beard District: includes school districts in Lackawanna, Pike, Susquehanna, and Wayne counties.
- Two Mountains District: includes school districts in Luzerne and Wyoming counties.

== Camps ==
The council manages two camps: Goose Pond Scout Reservation, located in Paupack Township, Pennsylvania, near Lake Wallenpaupack, and Camp Acahela, located in Tobyhanna Township, Pennsylvania, near the confluence of the Lehigh River and Tobyhanna Creek.

=== Goose Pond Scout Reservation ===
Goose Pond Scout Reservation
- Location: Paupack Township, PA 18438
- Country: United States
- Coordinates: 41.4044°N 75.2728°W
- Founded: 1920
- Camp Director: Dave Srebro
- Website gpsr.nepabsa.org

Goose Pond, the lake around which the whole camp is based, is a 42-acre glacial lake surrounded by hardwood and evergreen forest. The total area of the camp is 542 acres (2.19 km^{2}) which includes the lake. The camp is located near the northern end of the Pocono Plateau, Scranton.

Goose Pond Scout Reservation has been in continuous operation as a boy scout summer camp since 1920. Its resident Boy Scout summer camping season runs seven weeks from late June through mid August. During summer camp, a staff of scouts provide merit badge courses that scouts can attend during the week. Registration for the summer program typically starts at the end of the previous season. The summer camp conducts the Voyager Program to offer High Adventure experiences to older scouts and the Pathways Program to give first-year campers scout skill training. During the non-summer season the camp supports events such as Order of the Arrow Ordeal weekends, Cub Scout programs, unit weekend camping, council leadership courses, and the Klondike Derby. The camp also supports a high and low COPE Course throughout the Spring, Summer, and Fall seasons.

==== Camp features ====
- 10 platform tent campsites: Beaver, Capouse, Delaware, Iroquois, Lenape, Niagara, Pawnee, Seneca, Shawnee, and Slocum. During the summer camp season, the Pawnee site is reserved for camp staff. Most of these sites were established in the early 1950s when the camp transitioned from a practice of lodging campers from all troops at a single site to its current practice of lodging campers by troops, though the Delaware and Lenape sites were established in the 2000s. The council's website notes that all of these sites are available for non-summer camping.
- 1 primitive campsite: The Pioneer site is a primitive site, complete with pit latrines. Campers must bring and pitch their own tents.
- The Joseph J. Jermyn Assembly Hall was built in 1923 with an expansion added in 1993. It serves as the camp's main dining facility. Hundreds of plaques donated by troops, patrols, and camp staff cover the upper walls and rafters. The earliest plaques date back to 1951.
- The Dickson Lodge serves as the summer camp program's headquarters for its nature program and is available as a camping lodge in the non-summer seasons.
- The Handicraft Lodge houses the summer camping program's craft-oriented merit badge courses and serves as a camping lodge in the non-summer seasons. The building was constructed in 1930. It was most recently renovated in 2009 to include a covered porch and rooms for lodge camping.
- The Joseph J. Jermyn Administration Building was constructed in 1926. It houses the camp office and trading post on the first floor. The second floor contains an office for the program director and program staff, a staff lounge, and a conference room for staff and troop leader meetings.
- The Shapiro-Everly Reception and First Aid Building, better known as the Health Lodge, is located right beyond the main entrance gateway to the camp. The building houses the medical officer's station and quarters and the camp director's quarters. It was constructed in 1957.

In addition to the primary buildings, there are various other smaller structures such as the Croom Family Pavilion across from the dining hall, the Dan Beard Cabin, the Jim Naticchi Pavilion at the Scoutcraft area, the Cook's Cabin for the kitchen staff, the shower house, the Podewils Boat House, and the pump house. The shower house, renovated in 2014, features individual shower/restroom rooms.

==== Camp History highlights ====
William "Green Bar Bill" Hillcourt attended a Wood Badge course at Goose Pond in September 1992 by the Northeastern Pennsylvania Boy Scout Council, at which time he signed a structural support beam in the camp dining hall. Since Mr. Hillcourt departed soon afterward for a trip to Sweden, during which he died on November 9, 1992, the camp claims its Wood Badge course was the last official US Scouting event attended by William Hillcourt.

Goose Pond Scout Reservation's annual summer camping program has been continuously conducted since 1920. The camp claims its summer camping program is the fourth longest running Boy Scout summer camp program in the United States. (Note: David L. Eby's research on the oldest Boy Scout camps in the United States of America identifies many of the camps founded in the US in the 1910s period. News announcements about camp closures or conversions to Cub Scout camping programs or to weekend camping programs show several of these no longer operate as Boy Scout summer camps. Camp Book II, a report from over twenty years of research on camp openings and closures that cross-references dates of camp patches for patch collectors, agrees with the dates in Eby's work and lists only four camps that started running boy scout summer camp programs earlier than Goose Pond Scout Reservation: Owasippe Scout Reservation (Twin Lake, MI), Yawgoog Scout Reservation (Rockville, RI), Camp Friedlander (Loveland, OH), and Camp Parsons (Hood Canal, WA). Of these four, based on records from Camp Book II, although it has been open since 1919, Camp Friedlander did not host a Boy Scout summer program for a continuous number of years since 1919.)

Early in its history, Goose Pond Scout Reservation often sent hiking contingents to Daniel Carter Beard's Outdoor School 12 miles away in Lackawaxen Township, Pennsylvania. The camp is in the process of incorporating the last log cabin (Dan Beard's 1926 Kiva style headquarters cabin) from this site into its own facilities.

=== Camp Acahela ===
Camp Acahela
- Location: Blakeslee, PA
- Country: United States
- Coordinates: 41.1190°N 75.6340°W
- Founded: 1919
- Camp Director: William Zinky
- Website www.nepabsa.org/camp-acahela

Camp Acahela was founded in 1919. The camp is located in the village of Blakeslee, PA on a peninsula formed by the joining of the Lehigh River and the Tobyhanna Creek. The camp has a total area of 242 acres covered by a variety of landforms and vegetation, ranging from heavily wooded ridges and cliffs, to wide open parade fields, to shady groves of ancient fir trees that provide a wide variety of camping opportunities year-round for every type of Scouting unit. From 1919 until 1991 the camp hosted a boy scout summer camp program. Since 1992 the camp has offered an annual Cub Scout Resident camping program during the summer months, starting in late June. The resident program provides cub scout packs with five-day and three-day options, as well as day camping experiences.

==== Camp Features ====
- 6 Platform Tent Campsites: Blackfeet, Blackfoot, Crockett, Lucky 7, Lumberjack, and Trailwood.
- 4 Primitive Campsites: Eagle's Nest, Large Pines, Pinewood, and Small Pines.
- Sporting Activity Sites: BB Range, Archery Field, Swimming Pool, Obstacle Course, Activity Field.
- Shower House: a new shower/restroom facility with individual rooms completed in 2017.
- Dining Hall: Besides a cafeteria, the building also houses the climbing wall facility.

During the non-summer season the camp supports other events such as Order of the Arrow Ordeal weekends, council training courses, and Klondike Derbies. The camp is available for weekend camping reservations. Its location offers weekend campers access to many activities in the Pocono area.

== Order of the Arrow ==
Lowwapaneu Lodge 191
- Founded: January 1, 1991
- Lodge Chief: Diann Lyons
- Lodge Adviser: Mike Minello
- Lodge Staff Adviser: Dave Srebro
- Website http://lowwapaneu.org

Northeastern Pennsylvania Council is served by Order of the Arrow Lowwapaneu Lodge 191. The name "Lowwapaneu" contains the Lenape words for "north" and "east." The lodge's number is based on the date of the Lodge's first charter: January 1, 1991. The lodge's original totem was a totem pole that depicted the totems of the six predecessor lodges that merged over time to form Lowwapaneu Lodge: Acahela Lodge 223 (Bear), Quekolis Lodge 316 (Whippoorwill), Gischigan Lodge 223 (Rattlesnake), Monsey Lodge 543 (Wolf), Kiminschi Lodge 542 (Maple Leaf), and Amad'ahi Lodge 542 (Two Indians in a Canoe). In 1996 the lodge's totem was changed to a fire surrounded by a four-color Circle of Life.

== See also ==
- Scouting in Pennsylvania
