= Francis Brooke (cricketer, born 1884) =

English cricketer

Francis Ralph Russell Brooke (2 October 1884 – 20 June 1960) was an English cricketer active from 1910 to 1929 who played for Lancashire and in India for the Europeans. He was born in Bowdon, Cheshire and died in Basingstoke. He appeared in 62 first-class matches as a righthanded batsman and wicketkeeper. He scored 2,197 runs with a highest score of 115 and held 85 catches with 21 stumpings.
