= Goose Pond (New York) =

- Location of Goose Pond within New York
- Location: Herkimer County, New York
- Coordinates: 43°47′03″N 74°54′05″W
- Type: Lake
- Basin countries: United States
- Surface area: 10 acres (4.0 ha)
- Surface elevation: 1,775 ft (541 m)
- Settlements: Big Moose

Goose Pond is a small lake south-southeast of Big Moose in Herkimer County, New York. It drains south via an unnamed creek that flows into Lake Rondaxe. It is part of the Moose River watershed, which flows west to the Black River and ultimately Lake Ontario.

== See also ==
- List of lakes in New York
