= Goose Pond Reservation =

Nature preserve in Massachusetts, USA

Coordinates: 42.2815°N 73.1941°W

Goose Pond Reservation is a 112-acre (0.45 km^{2}) nature preserve in Lee, Massachusetts and is managed by the Trustees of Reservations as a wilderness area. There are no trails around the shoreline as it is much too rocky, but the area can be accessed by boat from the nearby boat ramp. The reservation is adjacent to National Park Service land and is crossed by the Appalachian Trail.

The reservation was established in 1986.
