= Goose Lake (Clinton County, Iowa) =

- Location within Iowa Location within the United States
- Location: Clinton County, Iowa
- Coordinates: 41°58′04″N 90°24′08″W
- Type: lake
- Basin countries: United States
- Surface elevation: 653 ft (199 m)

Goose Lake is a lake in Clinton County, Iowa, in the United States.

Goose Lake was named from the many wild geese seen there by early settlers.

== See also ==
- List of lakes in Iowa
